= Henry Gough =

Henry Gough may refer to:

- Sir Henry Gough (1649–1724), of Perry Hall, MP for Tamworth and Sheriff of Staffordshire
- Sir Henry Gough, 1st Baronet (1709–1774), his son, owner of the rotten borough of Bramber
- Henry Gough-Calthorpe, 1st Baron Calthorpe (1748–1798), his son, and his son Henry Gough-Calthorpe (1784–1790)

== See also ==
- Harry Gough (disambiguation)
- Gough-Calthorpe family
- Henry Gough Witchell (1906–1965), English cricketer
- Sir Hugh Henry Gough VC (1833–1909), British Indian Army officer
