= Harry Gough (disambiguation) =

Harry Gough may refer to:

- Harry Gough (1681–1751), chairman of the East India Company
- Sir Henry Gough, 1st Baronet (1709–1774), his brother, also known as Sir Harry
- Sir Henry Gough (1649–1724) of Perry Hall, their father, also known as Sir Harry
- Harry Dorsey Gough (1745–1808), American relative, merchant, planter, and Methodist preacher
- Harry D. Gough (died 1867), American politician
- Harold Gough (1890–1970), British soccer player, also known as Harry

== See also ==
- Henry Gough (disambiguation)
