= Gough-Calthorpe family =

English family

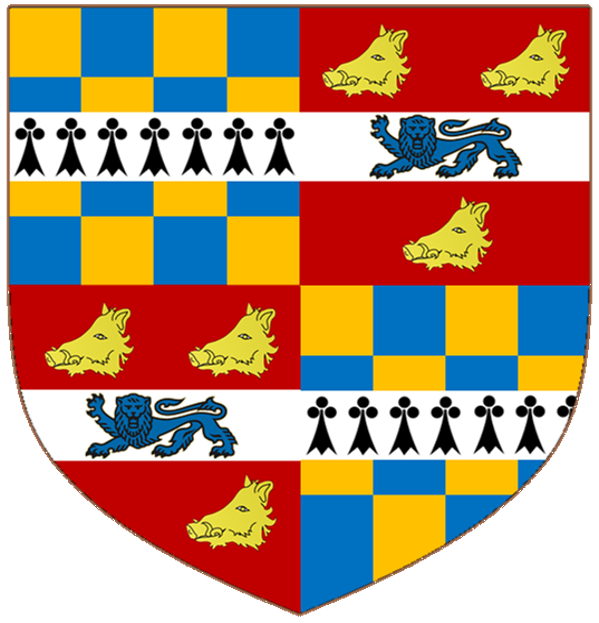
Coat of arms of Baron Calthorpe

The Gough-Calthorpe family is descended from ancient and notable families who both held lands in the area around Birmingham, England.

== History ==
Sir Henry Gough, 1st Baronet, Member of Parliament, (1709–1774) was made a baronet in the Baronetage of the United Kingdom in 1728. He married into the Calthorpe family, descendants of the Calthorpes who held the manors of Cockthorpe, Norfolk, and Ampton, Suffolk, and who were also sometime Lords of the Manor of Edgbaston.

The fess ermine in Birmingham's coat of arms is a reference to the arms of the Calthorpe family.

The Calthorpe Barony (1796) became extinct in June 1997 when the last Baron died without a male heir.

== Gough family ==
- Sir Henry Gough, Kt (1649–1724), of Perry Hall; son of John Gough (died 1665), matriculated at Christ Church, Oxford, 1666; was a student at Middle Temple in 1667; elected as a Tory MP in Tamworth in 1685; became High Sheriff of Staffordshire in 1671. Knighted in 1678 for services his grandfather rendered to the King in 1642.
- Walter Gough (1677–1730); married Martha Harwood, a niece of Sir Richard Hill.
- Walter Gough Jr (died 1773), married Bridget Kempson, daughter of Willis Kempson of Bilston.
- Sir Richard Gough (died 1728); third son of Henry Gough; a merchant, who travelled to the Mediterranean, India and China. In 1717 he purchased Edgbaston Hall from Thomas Belasyse, 3rd Viscount Fauconberg.
- Charles Gough thought to have rediscovered the island of Diego Alvarez, halfway between the Cape of Good Hope and Cape Horn, which became known as Gough Island, in 1731.
- Sir Henry Gough, 1st Baronet, M.P. (1709–1774); another son of Henry Gough; was made a Baronet. His second wife (her first marriage) was Barbara (1716–1782), only daughter and heiress of Reynolds Calthorpe of Elvetham, Hampshire, by his spouse Barbara (died 1724), daughter of Henry Yelverton, first Viscount Longueville and 15th Baron Grey of Ruthyn. They had a son, Henry, 2nd Bt., and two daughters, Barbara and Charlotte, the former marrying Isaac Spooner (their daughter Barbara married abolitionist William Wilberforce) and the latter marrying Sir John Palmer, 5th Baronet, MP for Leicestershire 1765–1780.
- Harry Gough, brother of Sir Henry, 1st Bt., chairman of the East India Company and MP for Bramber, who purchased ancient burgages in the Bull Ring, an estate in Ladywood, and a 25-acre (100,000 m^{2}) farm, now marked by Gough Street.
- Sir Henry Gough, 2nd Baronet (1749–1798), married in 1783, Frances (died 1827), second daughter of General Benjamin Carpenter, with issue, eleven children. Was created Henry Gough-Calthorpe, 1st Baron Calthorpe in 1796 having assumed the additional surname of Calthorpe upon inheriting, in 1788, the Elvetham and Norfolk estates of his maternal uncle, Sir Henry Calthorpe, K.B.. He left two sons, George, Lord Calthorpe, and Frederick Gough of Perry Hall.

== Gough-Calthorpe family ==
- Henry Gough-Calthorpe, 1st Baron Calthorpe (1749–1798), formerly Sir Henry Gough, 2nd Baronet (see above)
- Charles Gough-Calthorpe, 2nd Baron Calthorpe (1786–1807), no issue.
- George Gough-Calthorpe, 3rd Baron Calthorpe (1787–1851), succeeded his brother Charles, 2nd Lord, but died without issue.
- Frederick Gough, 4th Baron Calthorpe (1790–1868) succeeded his brothers George, 3rd Lord, and Charles, 2nd Lord. He was a Counsellor of King's College London, and married in 1823, Lady Charlotte Sophia, daughter of Henry Charles Somerset, 6th Duke of Beaufort, with issue: ten children.
- Frederick Henry William Gough-Calthorpe, 5th Baron Calthorpe (1826–1893)
- Augustus Cholmondeley Gough-Calthorpe, 6th Baron Calthorpe (1829–1910)
  - Rachel Gough-Calthorpe, daughter of Sir Augustus Cholmondeley Gough-Calthorpe married FitzRoy Hamilton Anstruther in 1898, creating the Anstruther-Gough-Calthorpe family.
- Somerset John Gough-Calthorpe, 7th Baron Calthorpe (1831–1912)
- Somerset Frederick Gough-Calthorpe, 8th Baron Calthorpe (1862–1940)
- Ronald Arthur Somerset Gough-Calthorpe, 9th Baron Calthorpe (1924–1945)
- Peter Waldo Somerset Gough-Calthorpe, 10th Baron Calthorpe (1927–1997)
- The Hon Sir. Somerset Arthur Gough-Calthorpe; (1864–1937); Admiral of the Fleet, R.N.
- The Hon. Frederick ("Freddie") Somerset Gough Calthorpe; (1892–1935); cricketer.

== Anstruther-Gough-Calthorpe family ==
- Sir Fitzroy Hamilton Anstruther-Gough-Calthorpe, 1st Baronet (1872–1957)
  - Sir Richard Hamilton Anstruther-Gough-Calthorpe, 2nd Baronet (1908–1985)
    - Niall Hamilton Anstruther-Gough-Calthorpe (1940–1970)
      - Sir Euan Hamilton Anstruther-Gough-Calthorpe, 3rd Baronet (born 1966)
        - Barnaby Charles Anstruther-Gough-Calthorpe (born 2005)
    - Michael Richard Anstruther-Gough-Calthorpe (1943–1990)
    - John Austen Anstruther-Gough-Calthorpe (born 1947), property developer
      - Georgiana Moireach Gay Anstruther-Gough-Calthorpe (born 1978), artist
      - Isabella Amaryllis Charlotte Anstruther-Gough-Calthorpe (born 1980), actress
      - Jacobi Richard Penn Anstruther-Gough-Calthorpe (born 1983), property developer
      - Gabriella Zanna Vanessa Anstruther-Gough-Calthorpe (born 1989), actress and model
      - Octavia Elsa Anstruther-Gough-Calthorpe (born 1991)

== Archives ==
Historical records of the Gough-Calthorpe family are held in multiple archives. Family papers are held at the Hampshire Record Office. Records of the Calthorpe Edgbaston Estate are held at the Library of Birmingham. Medieval deeds of properties owned by the Gough-Calthorpe family in Wolverhampton are held at the Cadbury Research Library (University of Birmingham).

== See also ==
- Calthorpe Park
- Perry Hall Mansion - home of Harry Dorsey Gough (died 8 May 1808)
- Perry Hall Park
- Perry Hall, Maryland
