= Woodlands Vale =

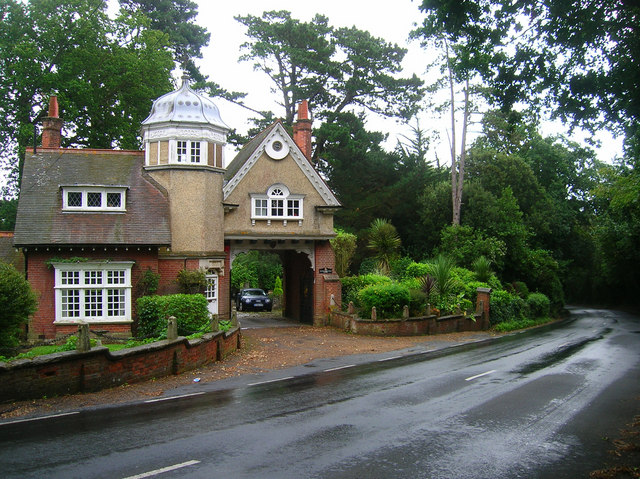
- Calthorpe Road Lodge - the house is not visible from the public highway

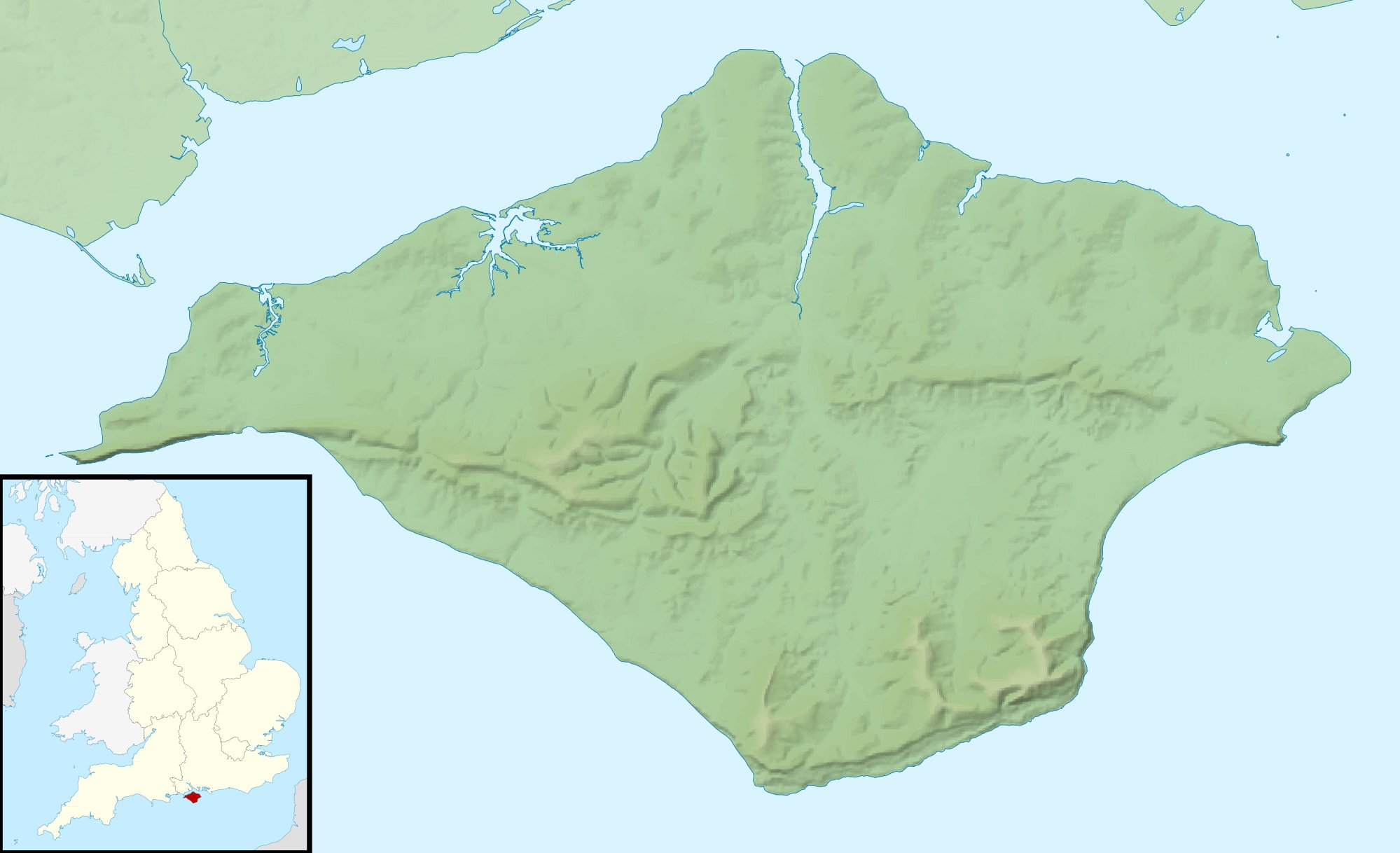
- Location within Isle of Wight
- 50.7217°N 1.1331°W
- Type: House
- Location: Seaview, Isle of Wight, England

History
- Built: 1870-1900

Site notes
- Architect(s): Samuel Sanders Teulon, Stephen Salter
- Architectural style: French Renaissance Revival
- Governing body: Privately owned

Listed Building – Grade II*
- Official name: Woodlands Vale, including rose arches, forecourt balustrading, terrace walling, alcove, pergola, steps, planters and ornamental ponds
- Designated: 18 May 1972
- Reference no.: 1234364

Listed Building – Grade II
- Official name: Woodlands Vale Lodge
- Designated: 19 August 2002
- Reference no.: 1031907

Listed Building – Grade II
- Official name: Garden building to north west of Woodlands Vale
- Designated: 17 March 2004
- Reference no.: 1390839

Listed Building – Grade II
- Official name: Garden building to south east of Woodlands Vale
- Designated: 17 March 2004
- Reference no.: 1390840

Listed Building – Grade II
- Official name: Japanese Steps and Shinto Arch
- Designated: 17 March 2004
- Reference no.: 1390841

Woodlands Vale is a Victorian era house in Seaview on the Isle of Wight. It is a Grade II* listed building.

== History ==
The Woodlands Vale estate was first developed by Charles Coach in the 1820s. In 1869 the property was bought by Augustus Gough-Calthorpe (1829–1910). Gough-Calthorpe, third son of Frederick Gough, 4th Baron Calthorpe, succeeded to the title on the death of his elder brother, Frederick Gough-Calthorpe, 5th Baron Calthorpe, in 1893. His father had previously engaged Samuel Sanders Teulon to build the Calthorpe's main country house, Elvetham Hall in Hampshire and Gough-Calthorpe engaged Teulon to redesign the existing house at Woodlands Vale as a seaside retreat. Building went on for the next forty years, firstly under Teulon and subsequently under the direction of Stephen Salter, and outlasted the sixth Lord Caltorpe, being continued by his younger brother, Somerset Gough-Calthorpe, 7th Baron Calthorpe, following his succession in 1910. (Note: Queen Victoria was a friend and frequently visited the house. Augustus Gough-Calthorpe is reported to have removed a pillar from his garden as it obstructed the Queen's view of The Solent from her own residence at Osborne House.)

During the 20th century the house operated as a hotel, but was later re-converted to a private residence, and owned by Ben Ainslie, the sailor. The house has been for sale since 2023.

== Architecture and description ==
The original house at Woodland Vale was a large stone building of two storeys. Teulon's, and subsequently Salter's, efforts transformed it into a Renaissance Revival house, "distantly derived from French château precedent." Teulon was among the more extreme of the major architects of the Gothic Revival. (Note: Samuel Sanders Teulon died insane in 1873, possibly as a result of syphilis.) The critic Henry-Russell Hitchcock considered Elvetham Hall "so complex in its composition and so varied in its detailing that it quite defies description". (Note: Michael Bullen, John Crook, Rodney Hubbuck and Nikolaus Pevsner, in the 2020 revised Hampshire: Winchester and the North volume of the Pevsner Buildings of England series, were more blunt; "a major house, but not one anyone would praise for its beauty.") At Woodlands, Teulon and Salter encased the existing house in additions, including entrance and staircase towers by Teulon, an "amazingly incongruous" porte-cochere, by Salter, and gables and a tower to the garden front, again by Teulon. These were supplemented by a loggia, a veranda and a billiard room. In its survey of 1912, shortly after the house was largely complete, the Victoria County History described Woodlands Vale as one of the "principal residences" of the parish. Its interior contains much original work. (Note: The Ryde Social Heritage Group records that the drawing room contained a painting depicting the loss of HMS Prince during the Crimean War. Somerset Gough-Calthorpe had served in the war and witnessed the incident, the painting being based on a contemporary sketch he made.)

The gardens have a number of features typical of the Victorian era in which it was created, including a pet cemetery and a Japanese garden. The garden is designated at Grade II on the Register of Historic Parks and Gardens. The house, along with a number of ancillary features, is listed at Grade II*, while the lodge, two structures within the grounds and some steps and a Shinto arch within the Japanese Garden are all listed at Grade II.

== Sources ==
- Bullen, Michael; Crook, John; Hubbuck, Rodney; Pevsner, Nikolaus (2010). Hampshire: Winchester and the North. Pevsner Buildings of England. New Haven, US and London: Yale University Press. ISBN 978-0-300-12084-4.
- Curl, James Stevens (2016). Oxford Dictionary of Architecture. Oxford University Press. ISBN 978-0-199-67499-2.
- Hitchcock, Henry-Russell (1977). Architecture:Nineteenth and Twentieth Centuries. Pelican History of Art. London: Penguin Books. ISBN 0-14-056115-3.
- Lloyd, David W.; Pevsner, Nikolaus (2006). Isle of Wight. The Buildings of England. New Haven, US and London: Yale University Press. ISBN 978-0-300-10733-3.
- Page, William (1912). "Parish of St Helens". A History of the County of Hampshire. Victoria County History. Vol. 5. London: Constable & Co. OCLC 277849345.
