= Augustus Gough-Calthorpe, 6th Baron Calthorpe =

British agriculturist and philanthropist (1829-1910)

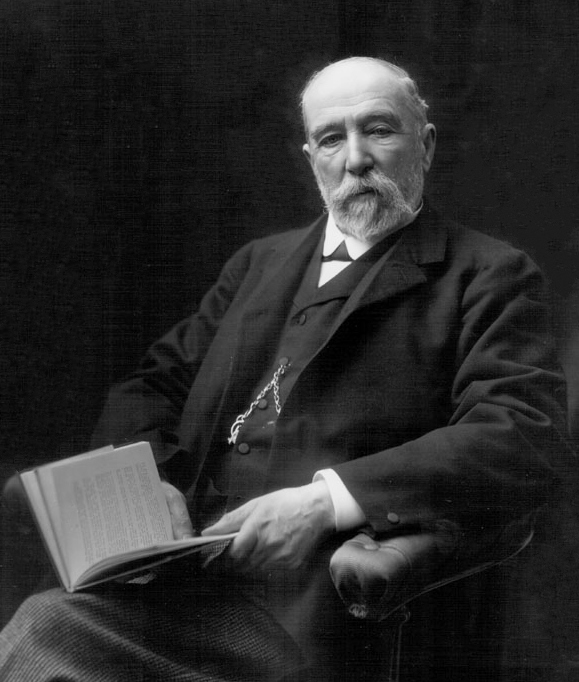
Augustus Cholmondeley Gough-Calthorpe, 6th Baron Calthorpe, 1906

Augustus Cholmondeley Gough-Calthorpe, 6th Baron Calthorpe (8 November 1829 – 22 July 1910) was a British peer, agriculturist, and philanthropist.

== Early life and education ==
Calthorpe was born at Elvetham Hall, Hampshire. He was the third son in the family of four sons and six daughters of Frederick Gough, 4th Baron Calthorpe (1790–1868), by his wife, Lady Charlotte Sophia Somerset, eldest daughter of Henry Somerset, 6th Duke of Beaufort.

The family descended from Sir Henry Gough, 1st Baronet (1709–1774), of Edgbaston, whose heir Henry, by his second wife, Barbara, heiress of Reynolds Calthorpe of Elvetham, succeeded in 1788 to the Elvetham estates, and taking the surname of Calthorpe, was created Baron Calthorpe on 15 June 1796.

He was educated at Harrow from 1845 to 1847. He then matriculated at Merton College, Oxford, Oxford on 23 February 1848, where he graduated with a B.A. in 1851 and later obtained an M.A. in 1855.

== Career ==
Calthorpe devoted himself to sport, agriculture, and the duties of a county magistrate. He lived on family property at Perry Hall, Perry Barr, then in Staffordshire, serving as High Sheriff of Staffordshire in 1881.

In 1870, he had a French Renaissance style house, Woodlands Vale, built near Ryde on the Isle of Wight; it was designed by Samuel Sanders Teulon. The nearby Calthorpe Road is named after the family.

At the general election of 1880 he stood with Major Frederick Gustavus Burnaby as Conservative candidate for the undivided borough of Birmingham, near which a part of the family estates lay, but was defeated, Philip Henry Muntz, John Bright, and Mr. Joseph Chamberlain being returned.

On the death on 26 June 1893 of his eldest brother, Frederick, who was unmarried (his second brother, George, had died unmarried in 1843) he succeeded to the peerage as sixth baron.

He showed generosity in devoting to public purposes much of his property about Birmingham. He made over to the corporation in 1894 the freehold of Calthorpe Park near (now in) that city, which his father had created in 1857, and took much interest in the development of the new Birmingham University. In 1900, he and his only son, Walter (1873–1906), presented 27½ acres of land, valued at £20,000, for the site of the university buildings, and in 1907 he gave another site, immediately adjacent, of nearly 20 acres, of the estimated value of £15,000, for a private recreation ground for the students.

On the family estates at Elvetham he started in 1900 what has become a noted herd of shorthorn cattle, and his Southdown sheep and Berkshire pigs were also famous.

== Marriage and issue ==
On 22 July 1869, Calthorpe married Maud Augusta Louisa Duncombe, youngest daughter of the Hon. Octavius Duncombe, seventh son of Charles Duncombe, 1st Baron Feversham, by whom he had one son, Walter (who predeceased him), and four daughters:

- Hon. Rachel (11 October 1871 – 25 May 1951), married in 1898 her cousin Sir Fitzroy Anstruther-Gough-Calthorpe
- Hon. Walter (2 May 1873 – 21 December 1906), died unmarried in St Moritz after a long period as an "invalid"
- Hon. Constance (21 November 1877 – 20 October 1957), married in 1907 Sir Eustace Wrixon-Becher, 4th Baronet
- Hon. Hilda (24 October 1880 – 25 September 1972), married in 1903 Lord Walter John Hervey, son of Lord Augustus Hervey and brother of 4th Marquess of Bristol
- Hon. Dorothy CBE (5 October 1885 – 23 January 1972), married in 1905 James Harris, 5th Earl of Malmesbury

Lord Calthorpe died after a short illness at his London residence at Grosvenor Square on 22 July 1910, and was buried at Elvetham, after cremation at Golders Green.

He was succeeded in the title by his younger brother, Lt.-Gen. Sir Somerset Gough-Calthorpe, 7th Baron Calthorpe (1831–1912).

== Arms ==
Coat of arms of Augustus Gough-Calthorpe, 6th Baron Calthorpe
Crest 1st: A Boar's Head couped at the neck Azure (Calthorpe); 2nd: A Boar's Head couped Argent pierced through the cheek with a Broken Spear Gules (Gough) Escutcheon Quarterly: 1 and 4th, Checky Or and Azure a Fess Ermine (Calthorpe); 2 and 3rd, Gules on a Fess Argent between three Boars' Heads couped Or a Lion passant Azure (Gough) Supporters On either side a Wild Man proper his Hair and Beard Sable wreathed about the head and waist with Oak Vert fructed Or the exterior hand holding a Club erect of the last Motto Gradu Diverso Via Una (The same way by different steps)

== Bibliography ==
- This article incorporates text from a publication now in the public domain: Clarke, Ernest (1912). "Gough-Calthorpe, Augustus Cholmondeley". In Lee, Sidney (ed.). Dictionary of National Biography (2nd supplement). London: Smith, Elder & Co.
- Mosley, Charles, ed. (2003). Burke's Peerage, Baronetage & Knighthood (107 ed.). Burke's Peerage & Gentry. p. 113. ISBN 0-9711966-2-1.

Peerage of Great Britain
Preceded by Frederick Gough-Calthorpe	Baron Calthorpe; 1893–1910	Succeeded by Somerset Gough-Calthorpe
