= Henry Calthorpe (died 1788) =

Sir Henry Calthorpe (c.1717–1788) K.B. of Elvetham in Hampshire, was a Member of Parliament for the constituency of Hindon.

== Biography ==
Calthorpe was the only son of Reynolds Calthorpe of Elvetham and his second wife Barbara (died 1724), eldest daughter of Henry Yelverton, Viscount Longueville and Baron Grey of Ruthyn, and Barbara, second daughter and one of the coheirs of Sir John Talbot, of Laycock in Wiltshire. (Note: Calthorpe also had an elder half brother Reynolds Calthorpe, the younger who was the son of Reynolds Calthorpe by a previous marriage)

Calthorpe represented the borough of Hindon in Parliament in 1741–1744. He was created a Knight of the Bath on 28 May in the same year, and installed 20 October following. Sir Henry went mad (he was seen walking down Pall Mall with a red ribbon around his head saying he was off to see the King). After he was declared a lunatic and his cousin James Calthorpe, M.P. was appointed to manage his estate.

Sir Henry died unmarried, at his seat at Elvetham, 14 April 1788; and by his death the male line of this family became extinct. His estates devolved to the children of Barbara his only sister, who was married in 1741 to Sir Henry Gough of Edgbaston, in Warwickshire, M.P. for Totnes and afterwards for Bramber. Henry, their eldest son, on the death of Sir Henry Calthorpe his uncle, assumed the name and arms of Calthorpe, and was created Baron Calthorpe, of Cockthorpe in Norfolk, 15 June 1796.
