= Southfield F.C. =

Southfield
- Full name: Southfield Football Club
- Founded: 1881
- Dissolved: 1893
- Ground: Victoria Park, Handsworth
- Secretary: 1885: George Thomas Morgan 1887: John Ingram 1888: P. O. Humphries
Home colours

Southfield Football Club, occasionally referred to as Birmingham Southfield, was an English football club based in Birmingham, then in Warwickshire.

== History ==
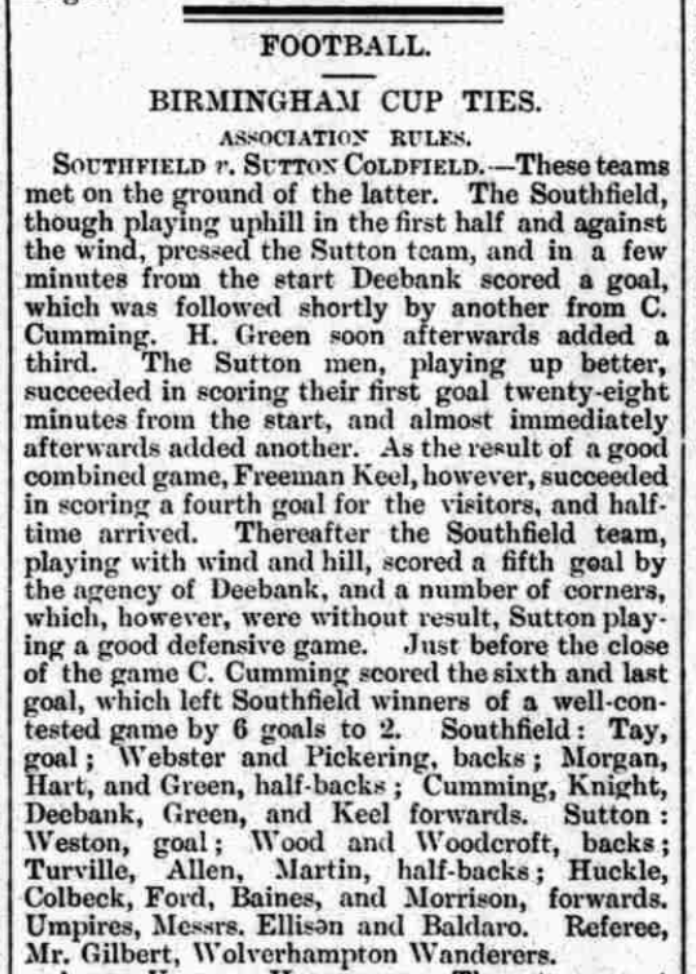
1886–87 Birmingham Senior Cup 1st Round, Sutton Coldfield 2–6 Southfield, Warwickshire Herald 14 October 1886

The club was founded by John Ingram, a copper broker who had been closely involved with the Calthorpe F.C. amateur club as umpire and occasional goalkeeper, as the footballing branch of the Southfield Athletic Club. Southfield's first recorded match was against the Mayflower club, at Summerfield Park, Balsall Heath, in early 1881. The club was a working-class amateur club, key player William Deebank being a carpenter.

The club joined the Birmingham Football Association for the 1883–84 season and promptly entered the Birmingham Senior Cup, losing 5–0 at West Bromwich Wellington in the first round, a "voluminous" Southfield protest against the size and state of the pitch being literally laughed out of committee. Ingram optimistically suggested at the start of the season that the Birmingham FA push to host an end-of-season play-off between the champion clubs within the United Kingdom, although the idea did not take off.

The club's matches were originally generally low-key, twice suffering match abandonments because of a burst ball. The club was not an opponent for the bigger Birmingham clubs in friendlies. The club did play St George's during the latter's one season at Winson Green, but otherwise the club could only attract the second team of Small Heath Alliance and the third team of Aston Villa.

=== Player death ===
On 23 May 1885, during a match against Aston Trafalgar at Bournbrook, one of the club's players, Charles Bache, suffered a knee to his thigh. The day after he sought medical assistance, but the doctors found nothing wrong; four days later, he was admitted to hospital with acute blood poisoning, and died. An inquest found the blood poisoning was a result of his footballing injury and it returned a verdict of accidental death. Bache, a lamp-maker, was 23.

=== Stepping up ===
The club was boosted at the start of the 1886–87 season when the Moseley Olympic side broke up, and most of its members joined Southfield, which fielded a second XI under the Southfield Olympic name. With more players available, the club became a member of the Birmingham Junior FA, and entered its second XI in the Junior Cup. 1886–87 saw the club's only significant run in the Senior Cup; Southfield beat Sutton Coldfield 6–2 away in the first round, then drew a bye in the second. In the third, Southfield was drawn at home to Burslem Port Vale, and the club switched the fixture to gain a better crowd. 2–1 down at half-time having played up the slope in the first half, spectators fancied Southfield for the win. However the de facto professional Valiants were in much better condition and won 6–1.

In October 1886, at a Birmingham FA meeting for the selection of a side to play the Sheffield Football Association, the Southfield representative nominated the entire Southfield side. Perhaps because of the snub of not having a single player accepted for the representative side, the club entered the FA Cup the following season, despite many better-established Birmingham clubs not doing so. The club was drawn to play Burton Swifts away from home and lost 7–0, conceding five in the first half. The club was described as "a fine set of fellows, but shocking bad players at football". There was praise for the club's esprit de corps and wishes expressed that the players could use the tie to develop further.

=== Decline ===
In fact the opposite seems to have happened - its last entry to the Birmingham Senior Cup was in 1888–89, and the club retreated to a much lower standard. An attempt to turn professional in 1889 was not successful, and the club, which had long been seen as the "pet" of Ingram, who funded payment for ex-professionals largely from his own pocket, nearly broke up at the end of the 1891–92 season. Ingram - "who loves the game too much to discard it" - revived the club in October 1892. The attempt was in vain, as Southfield only turned up with 8 men for a match at Singers on 3 December 1892, and, with three local players press-ganged into action, the club bowed out with a 13–1 defeat.

== Colours ==
The club colours were orange, black, and red, which were similar to those of the amateur legends the Wanderers.

== Ground ==
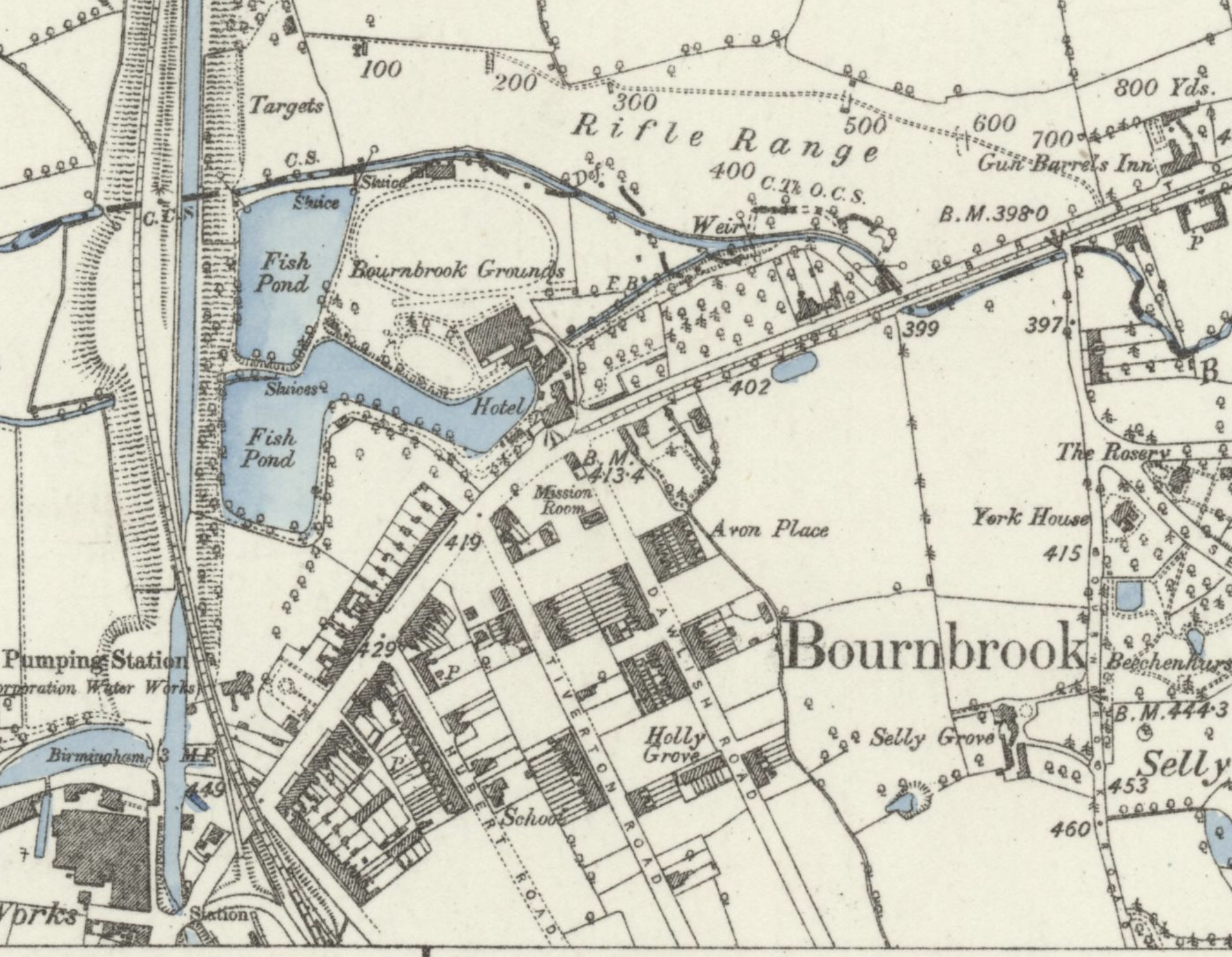
Location of the Bournbrook Grounds, from the Staffordshire Sheet LXXII.SE Ordnance Survey map, 1888

The club's first matches were at Summerfield Park, before moving to Calthorpe Park before the 1881–82 season. In 1883 it moved to Bournbrook, while occasionally still playing matches at the Cannon Hill Road end of Calthorpe Park.

In 1886, the club moved to Edwardes Street in Balsall Heath, to ease access "from all parts of the town". In 1888 the club moved again, to a new ground near Victoria Park in Handsworth, half-a-mile from Handsworth Railway Station.

== Notable players ==
- Billy Ollis, later of Small Heath Alliance
