= St John's Church, Oakfield, Ryde =

Coordinates: 50°43′24″N 01°08′52″W

St. John's Church, Oakfield, Ryde
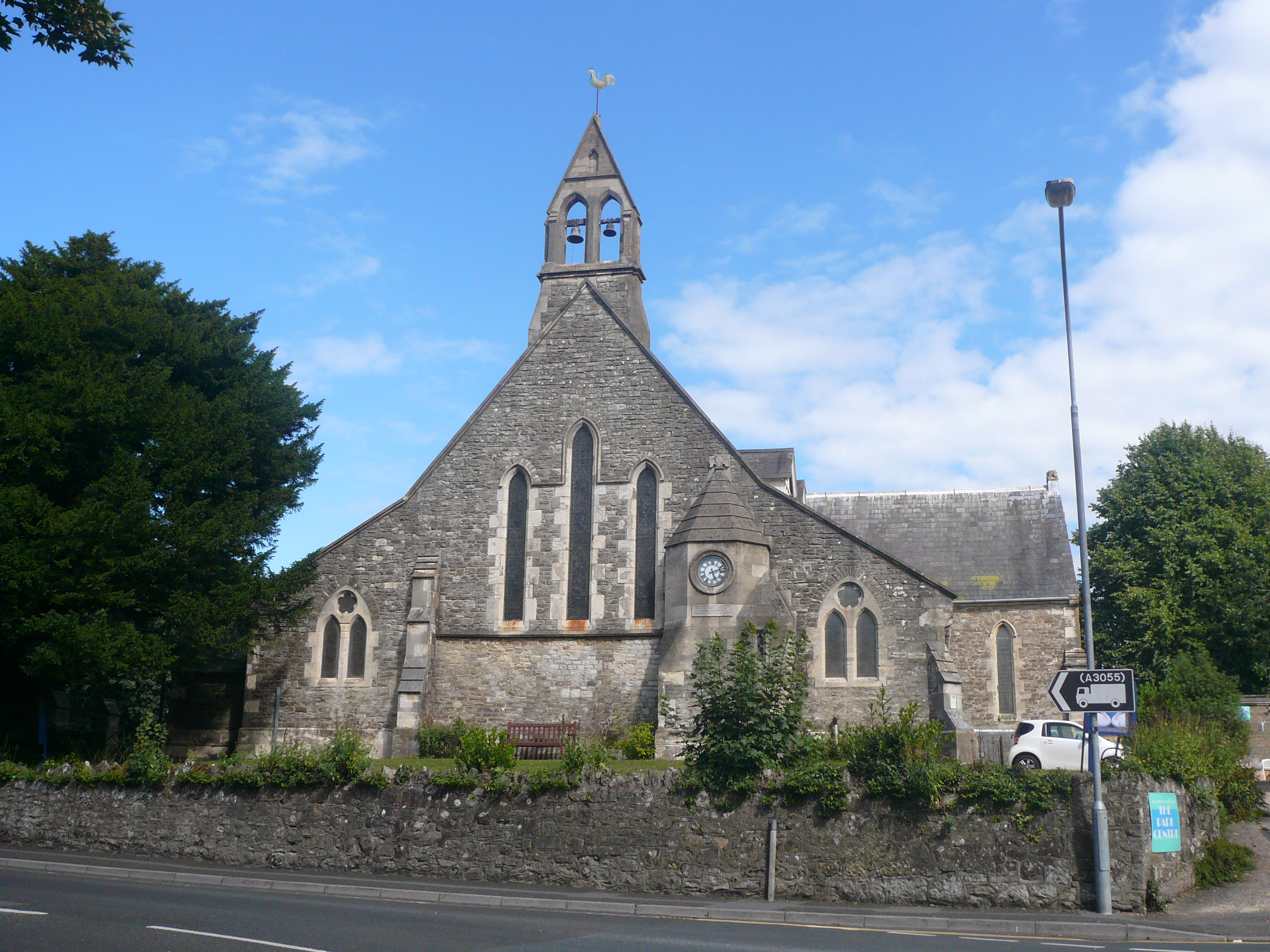
- St. John's Church, Oakfield, Ryde
- Denomination: Church of England
- Churchmanship: Broad church
- Website: www.stjohnsryde.org.uk

History
- Dedication: St. John

Administration
- Province: Canterbury
- Diocese: Portsmouth
- Parish: Oakfield, Isle of Wight

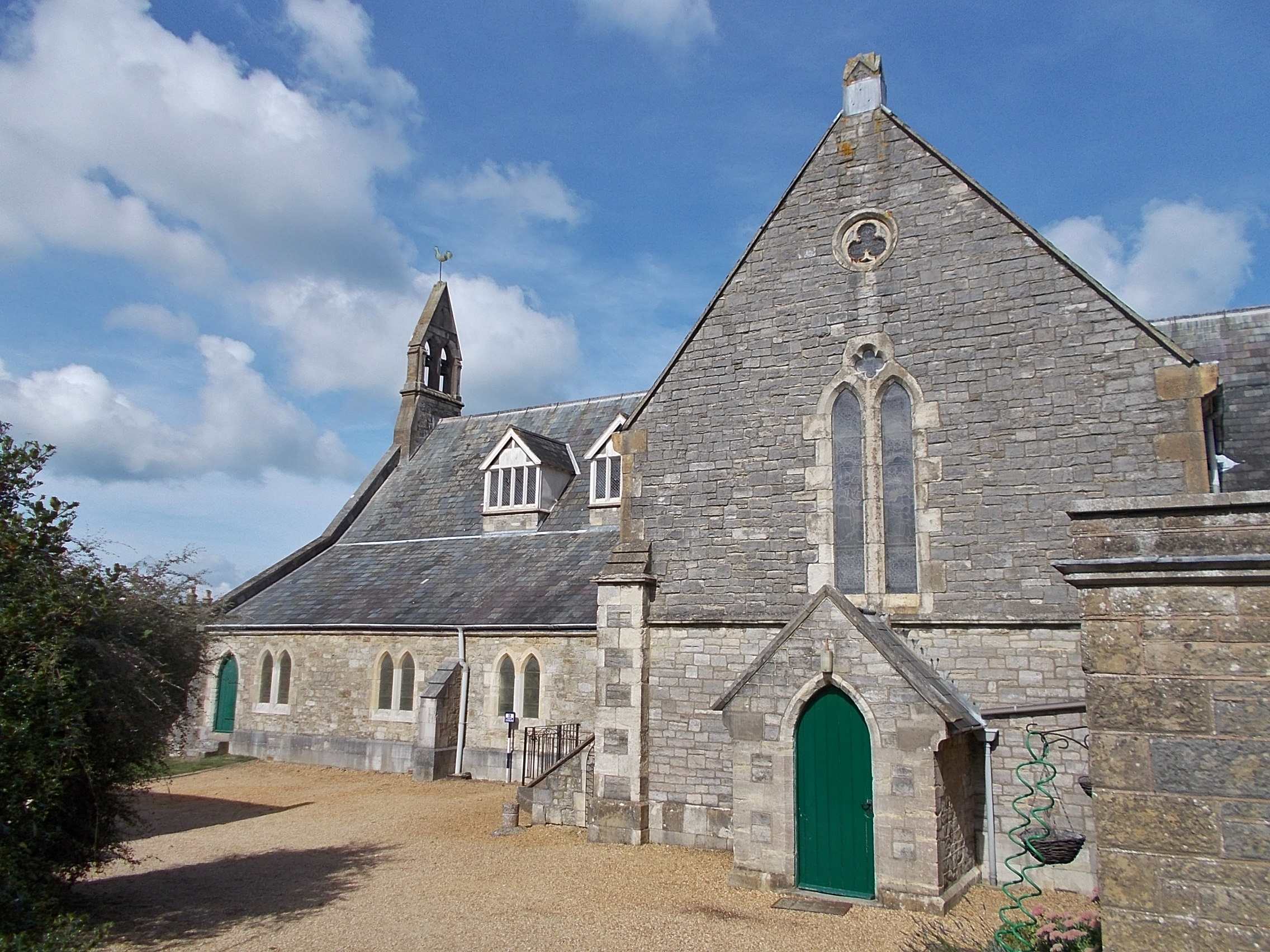
South face of the church

St. John's Church, Oakfield, Ryde is a parish church in the Church of England located in Ryde, Isle of Wight.

== History ==
The church was built in 1842–43 by James and John Langdon to a design by the architect Thomas Hellyer.

The church was consecrated on 18 July 1843 by Charles Richard Sumner the Bishop of Winchester. Successive enlargements to the building were made in following years as the local population grew, and on 3 December 1870 the enlarged church was re-consecrated. At the same time St John's became a parish church, until that time having been a chapel-of-ease in the parish of St Helens.

A Lady chapel was added in 1914 in memory of the 7th Lord Calthorpe whose family lived at nearby Woodlands Vale, and were regular worshippers at the church. The chancel of the church was enlarged in 1954.

The churchyard contains Commonwealth war graves of 13 service personnel from World War I and two from World War II.

In 1970 a church hall was added as an extension of the church building, the previous hall having been situated some distance away at the junction of St John's Hill and St John's Avenue. The church hall was refurbished in 2006 and was used for a number of years as The Park Centre, a community resource. Management of the hall has now returned to the PCC of St John's Church and continues to be used by church and community groups.

== Organ ==
A specification of the organ can be found on the National Pipe Organ Register.

=== List of organists ===
- J. Heaton-Bailey 1886 – 1890
- Walter Brennand Smith ????
- Sidney L. Torr 1910 – ca. 1912 – ????
- R. H. Toogood. ca. 1921
- Dudley Teague ca. 1967
- Jeanette Richards ca. 1980
