= Thomas Thoroton =

British politician

Thomas Thoroton (c. 1723–1794), was a British politician who sat in the House of Commons for 25 years between 1757 and 1782.

== Early life ==
Thoroton was the son of Robert Thoroton of Screveton and his wife Mary Levett, daughter of Sir Richard Levett Lord Mayor of London and widow of Abraham Blackborne, merchant of London. He was educated at Westminster School in 1736 and was admitted at Trinity Hall, Cambridge as scholar on 30 December 1741 and at Lincoln's Inn on 22 May 1745. He became political agent to John Manners, 3rd Duke of Rutland and married his illegitimate daughter Roosilia Drake in October 1751.

== Political career ==
Thoroton was returned as Member of Parliament for Boroughbridge in a by-election in 1757. In the 1761 general election he was returned as MP for Newark on Duke of Newcastle's interest. He was Secretary to the Board of Ordnance from 1763 to 1770. He stood in the 1768 general election contesting Bramber on Granby's interest. Though defeated in the poll he was seated on petition in 1769. He was returned unopposed at Bramber in 1774 and 1780. He took a great part in managing the affairs of Charles Manners, 4th Duke of Rutland. During the Gordon riots in 1780 he was highly active and rescued several victims from the mob.

== Later life ==
In 1789 Thoroton sold his estates at Alfreton and Swanwick, Derbyshire, and purchased Flintham House and land at Flintham, Nottinghamshire, close to Screveton. He died on 9 May 1794 and was buried at Screveton.

Several of his children were bound up in the affairs of the Dukes of Rutland. His daughter Mary eloped with and married Charles Manners-Sutton Archbishop of Canterbury, and his son Thomas sat in parliament for Grantham on the Rutland interest between 1802 and 1812.

Parliament of Great Britain
Preceded by Sir Cecil Bisshopp, Bt; Earl of Euston	Member of Parliament for Boroughbridge; 1757– 1761; With: Sir Cecil Bisshopp, Bt	Succeeded by Sir Cecil Bisshopp, Bt; Brice Fisher
Preceded by John Manners; Job Staunton Charlton	Member of Parliament for Newark; 1761– 1768; With: John Manners	Succeeded by John Manners; John Shelley
Preceded by The Lord Winterton; Charles Lowndes	Member of Parliament for Bramber; 1769– 1782; With: Charles Ambler 1769-1774; Sir Henry Gough1774-1782	Succeeded by Hon. Henry Fitzroy Stanhope; Sir Henry Gough
