= Baron Calthorpe =

Barony in the Peerage of Great Britain

Barony of Calthorpe
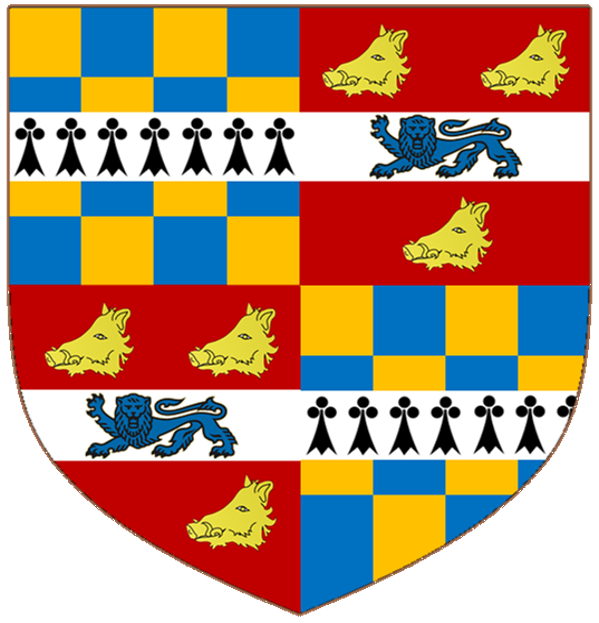
- Blazon Arms: Quarterly: 1st and 4th, Checky Or and Azure a Fess Ermine (Calthorpe); 2nd and 3rd, Gules on a Fess Argent between three Boars' Heads couped Or a Lion passant Azure (Gough).
- Creation date: 16 Jun 1796
- Created by: George III
- Peerage: Peerage of Great Britain
- First holder: Henry Gough-Calthorpe
- Last holder: Peter Gough Calthorpe
- Heir apparent: None
- Subsidiary titles: Baronet (of Edgbaston)
- Status: Extinct
- Extinction date: 23 May 1997
- Motto: Gradu Diverso Via Una (The same way by different steps)

Baron Calthorpe, of Calthorpe in the County of Norfolk, was a title in the Peerage of Great Britain. It was created in 1796 for Sir Henry Gough, 2nd Baronet, who had previously represented Bramber in Parliament. Born Henry Gough, he had assumed the additional surname of Calthorpe upon inheriting the Elvetham and Norfolk estates of his maternal uncle, Sir Henry Calthorpe, in 1788. The Baronetcy, of Edgbaston in the County of Warwick, had been created in the Baronetage of Great Britain on 6 April 1728 for Lord Calthorpe's father Henry Gough, who represented Totnes and Bramber in the House of Commons. He was the husband of Barbara, daughter of Reynolds Calthorpe. Three of Lord Calthorpe's sons, the second, third and fourth Barons, both succeeded in the titles. The latter sat as a member of parliament for Hindon and Bramber. In 1845 he assumed by Royal licence for himself the surname of Gough only. His eldest son, the fifth Baron, represented East Worcestershire in Parliament as a Liberal. The fifth Baron's younger brother, the seventh Baron (who succeeded his elder brother, the sixth Baron), was a Lieutenant-General in the Army. The latter's son, the eighth Baron, was succeeded by his grandson, the ninth Baron. The titles became extinct on the death of the ninth Baron's younger brother, the tenth Baron, in 1997.

The famous British architect Sir John Soane was the ancestor of the 8th, 9th and 10th barons.

== Gough baronets, of Edgbaston (1728) ==
- Sir Henry Gough, 1st Baronet (died 1774)
- Sir Henry Gough, 2nd Baronet (1748–1798) (created Baron Calthorpe in 1796)

== Barons Calthorpe (1796) ==
- Henry Gough-Calthorpe, 1st Baron Calthorpe (1749–1798)
  - Hon. Henry Gough-Calthorpe (1784–1790)
- Charles Gough-Calthorpe, 2nd Baron Calthorpe (1786–1807), died unmarried
- George Gough-Calthorpe, 3rd Baron Calthorpe (1787–1851), succeeded his brother, died unmarried
- Frederick Gough, 4th Baron Calthorpe (1790–1868), succeeded his brother
- Frederick Henry William Gough-Calthorpe, 5th Baron Calthorpe (1826–1893), succeeded his father, died unmarried
- Augustus Cholmondeley Gough-Calthorpe, 6th Baron Calthorpe (1829–1910), succeeded his brother, died without surviving male issue
  - Hon. Walter Gough-Calthorpe (1873–1906)
- Somerset John Gough-Calthorpe, 7th Baron Calthorpe (1831–1912)
- Somerset Frederick Gough-Calthorpe, 8th Baron Calthorpe (1862–1940), Captain
- Ronald Gough-Calthorpe, 9th Baron Calthorpe (1924–1945), eldest son of The Honourable Frederick Gough-Calthorpe (d. 1935) and his wife Dorothy (d. 1985), née Vernon-Harcourt. The 9th Baron, having served in World War II, was killed in an aeroplane accident in October 1945, aged 21.
- Peter Waldo Somerset Gough-Calthorpe, 10th Baron Calthorpe (1927–1997), was educated at Stowe and succeeded his elder brother as the 10th and last Baron Calthorpe in 1945. He served as a lieutenant in the Welsh Guards in Palestine and later became an airline pilot, serving as managing director of Mercury Airlines 1960–1965. He also wrote two novels under the pseudonym Peter Somerset in 1966–1967. He married first, in 1956 (dissolved in 1971), Saranne Frances Alexander (d. 1984), of Dublin, and secondly, in 1979, Elizabeth Young, of Guildford, Surrey, who survives him as the last Lady Calthorpe. Lord Calthorpe later resided on the Isle of Man.

== See also ==
- Gough-Calthorpe family
- Anstruther-Gough-Calthorpe baronets
- Calthorpe, Oxfordshire

Baronetage of Great Britain
Preceded by Turner baronets	Gough baronets of Edgbaston; 6 April 1728	Succeeded by Wyche baronets
