= Balsall Heath West =

Electoral ward in Birmingham, England

- Population: 12,155
- Metropolitan borough: City of Birmingham
- Metropolitan county: West Midlands
- Region: West Midlands
- Country: England
- Sovereign state: United Kingdom
- UK Parliament: Birmingham Ladywood
- Councillors: Shehla Moledina (Labour)

Balsall Heath West is an electoral ward of Birmingham City Council covering an urban area to the south of Birmingham city centre in the West Midlands, England.

The ward was created in 2018 as a result of boundary changes that saw the number of wards in Birmingham increase from 40 to 69.

== Boundaries ==
The ward was largely created from the former Sparkbrook ward. Following a review of Westminster parliamentary constituency boundaries, Balsall Heath West was moved from Birmingham Hall Green constituency (with the exception of a small area of housing between Bristol Road and Pershore Road which lay within Birmingham Edgbaston) to Birmingham Ladywood for the 2024 United Kingdom general election.

== Profile ==
The ward contains areas of Balsall Heath included in post-war slum clearance regeneration and late Victoria/Edwardian terraces. Whilst the ward does not include Edgbaston Cricket Ground it does include the areas immediately to its north and east, including Calthorpe Park.

Black, Asian, and Minority Ethnic groups (BAME) comprise 83.5% of the ward's total population (compared to Birmingham ward average of 51.4% and England ward average of 19.0%). Pakistanis form the largest ethnic group in Balsall Heath West at 29.2%. Just over half of employed residents (51.1%) are in Lower Skilled Occupations, significantly higher than for Birmingham (40.7%) and England (34.1%). As of 2019, Balsall Heath West was ranked in the 10% most deprived wards in England and was the 9th most deprived of Birmingham's 69 wards.

== Councillors ==
Election	Councillor
2022	Shehla Moledina (Lab)
2018	Zhor Malik (Lab)

== Elections results ==
Balsall Heath West 2022
Party	Candidate	Votes	%	±%
Labour	Shehla Moledina	1,150	51.8	−24.6
Conservative	Zhor Malik	710	32.0	26.5
Liberal Democrats	Haleema Khatoon	151	6.8	−1.2
Green	Carol Guest	121	5.5	0.0
Workers Party - Birmingham	Paul Jonathan Scrivens	88	4.0	−2.2
Majority		440		
Turnout		2,220		
Labour hold		Swing		

Councillor Zhor Malik switched from Labour to the Conservatives at a council budget meeting held on 23 February 2022.

Balsall Heath West 2018
Party	Candidate	Votes	%	±%
Labour	Zhor Malik	1,938	76.4	
Liberal Democrats	Islam Issa	204	8.0	
Birmingham Worker	Sammi Ibrahem	156	6.2	
Conservative	Ali Fazel	139	5.5	
Green	Martin Guest	98	3.9	
Majority		1,734		
Turnout		2,570		
Labour win (new seat)				
