= Perry Hall Mansion =

Historic house in Maryland, United States

- Perry Hall
- U.S. National Register of Historic Places
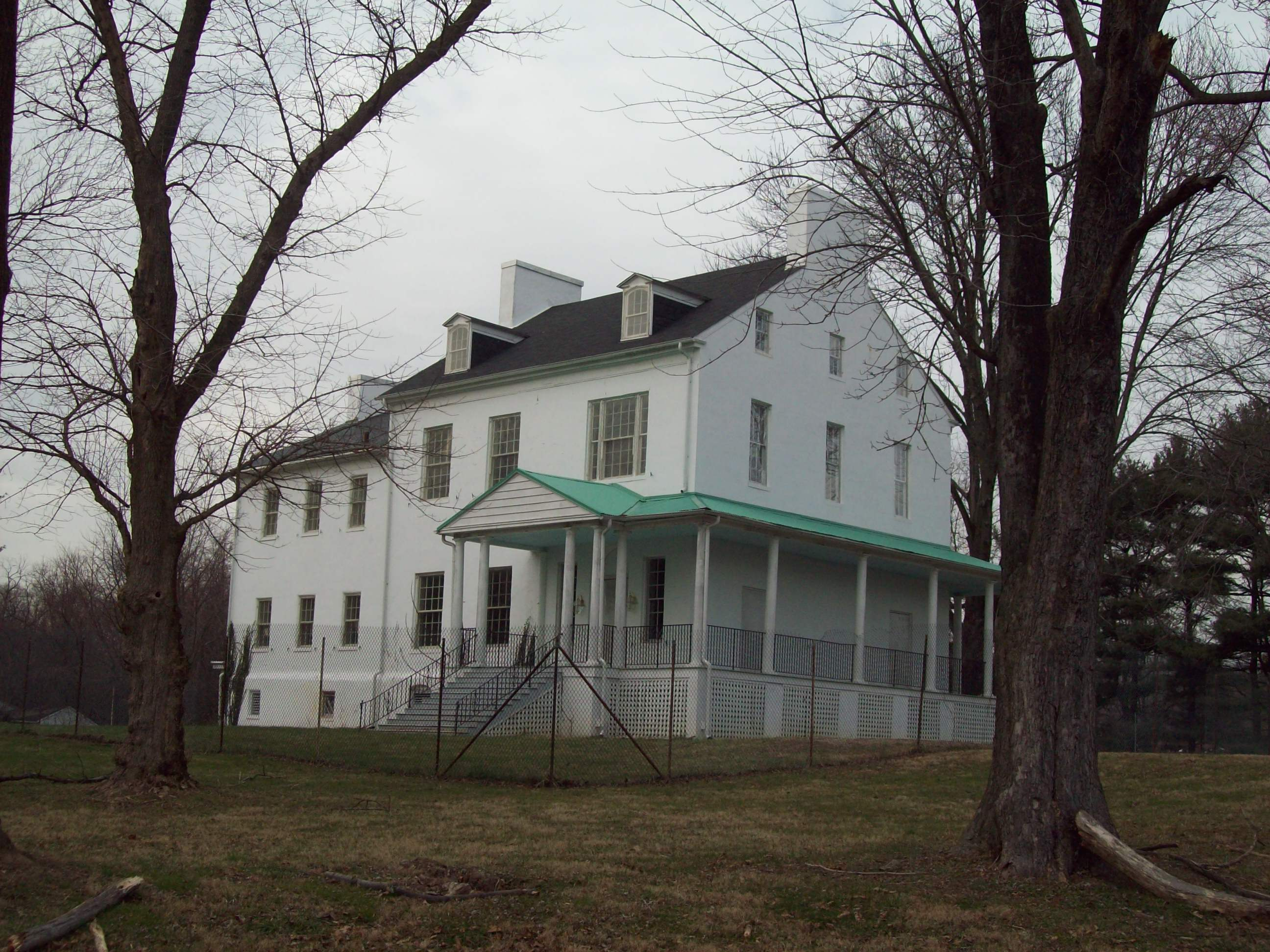
- Perry Hall Mansion, December 2009

- Location within Maryland Location within the United States
- Location: 3930 Perry Hall Road, Perry Hall, Maryland
- Coordinates: 39.429121°N 76.4588403°W
- Area: 3.9 acres (1.6 ha)
- Built: 1773
- Architectural style: Georgian, Palladian
- NRHP reference No.: 80001796
- Added to NRHP: April 23, 1980

The Perry Hall Mansion is a historic structure located in the area to which it gave its name, Perry Hall, Baltimore County, Maryland, United States. Erected on a hill above the Gunpowder River Valley, the mansion is an excellent example of late colonial and early 19th-century life in eastern Baltimore County.

== History ==
Construction began under Corbin Lee, who died in 1773. It was completed under Harry Dorsey Gough, a wealthy Baltimore merchant, in 1776. Gough named the estate Perry Hall, after his family's ancestral home of the same name within what is now Perry Hall Park, in Perry Barr, England, a northern suburb of Birmingham. From the 16-room mansion, Gough administered his vast plantation operation, where dozens of slaves tended cattle, various food crops, and stands of tobacco. The Perry Hall estate was so influential that maps from the period typically identify modern-day Bel Air Road (U.S. Route 1) as "Perry Hall Road" or "Gough's Road."

Gough died on May 8, 1808. Due to his statewide prominence, more than 2,000 people attended his funeral, which was held at the Perry Hall estate. The mansion was generally viewed as being at its zenith during the early Nineteenth Century. Visitors commented on the distinctive architectural features of the home as well as the lush gardens on the surrounding grounds. When one looks at the mansion as it existed in Gough's time, it is clear that the house included features that mirrored the diverse facets of Harry Dorsey Gough's life. The impressive wine cellars and expansive grand hall used for entertaining symbolized Gough's socially prominent life before his conversion to Methodism. After his conversion, Gough built a chapel near the mansion's eastern wing that allowed him to quietly pursue his religious worship, along with his family, servants, and other neighboring landowners.

Perry Hall remained under the ownership of Gough's descendants until 1852 when it was sold to investors who subdivided much of the property among immigrant families who built dozens of farms. The mansion remained in private ownership for over two centuries, and by 2001, the vast estate had been whittled down to approximately four acres. That year, the mansion was sold to Baltimore County for future use as a museum and community center. The home in its original form appears in three large paintings made about 1803 by Francis Guy.

It was listed on the National Register of Historic Places in 1980.

== Friends of the Perry Hall Mansion ==
Since its acquisition by the Department of Parks and Recreation for Baltimore County, the Perry Hall Mansion has received a comprehensive exterior renovation. In addition, a structure has been created to allow the public to be directly involved in shaping the future of this historically significant property.

The Friends of the Perry Hall Mansion is a freestanding organization, formed in September 2007, that aims to work to complete the renovations at the mansion, and care for the structure once the project is finished. The officers and directors will work to achieve the group's mission to educate the public about the Perry Hall Mansion and provide input to the Baltimore County government on its uses and operations.

The Friends' agenda includes continued fund-raising for the interior renovation of the building, the initiation of an archaeological dig on the property, and the completion of a master plan to help guide the future use and continuous improvement of the mansion and grounds.

== Sale ==
In May 2024, the Baltimore County Council voted 6–0 to sell the Perry Hall Mansion to Robert Lehnhoff, a landscaper from Kingsville, Maryland, who planned to convert the mansion into a bed-and-breakfast, for $5,000. The county also approved providing $250,000 to help with the mansion's restoration. Lehnhoff backed out of the purchase in August 2024, telling county officials that the purchase was no longer feasible. In November 2026, the Baltimore County Council approved the sale of the Perry Hall Mansion to the nonprofit Preservation Alliance of Baltimore County for $1, and gave the organization $250,000 for renovations and $10,000 toward closing costs.

== Gallery ==
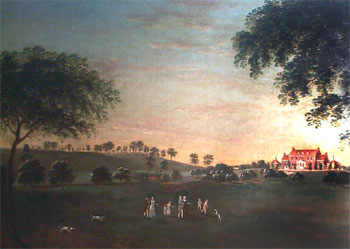
Artist Francis Guy's (1760-1820) portrait of Perry Hall Mansion, painted in 1803

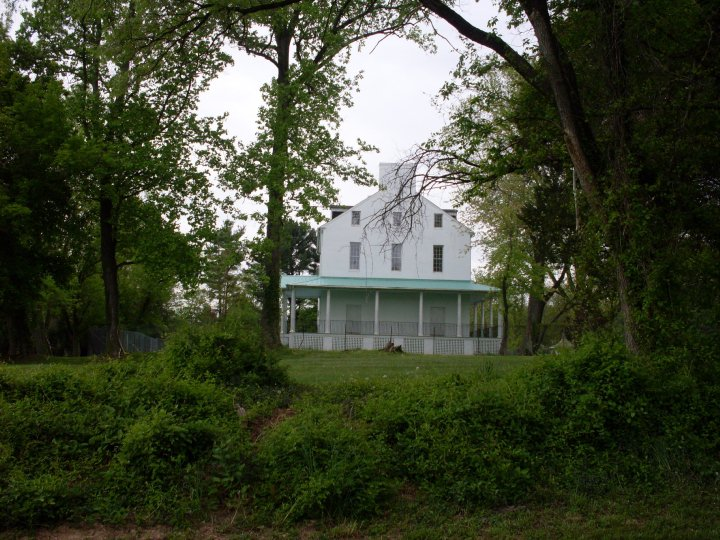
The East wing of the mansion
