= Harry Dorsey Gough =

American merchant, planter and Methodist preacher

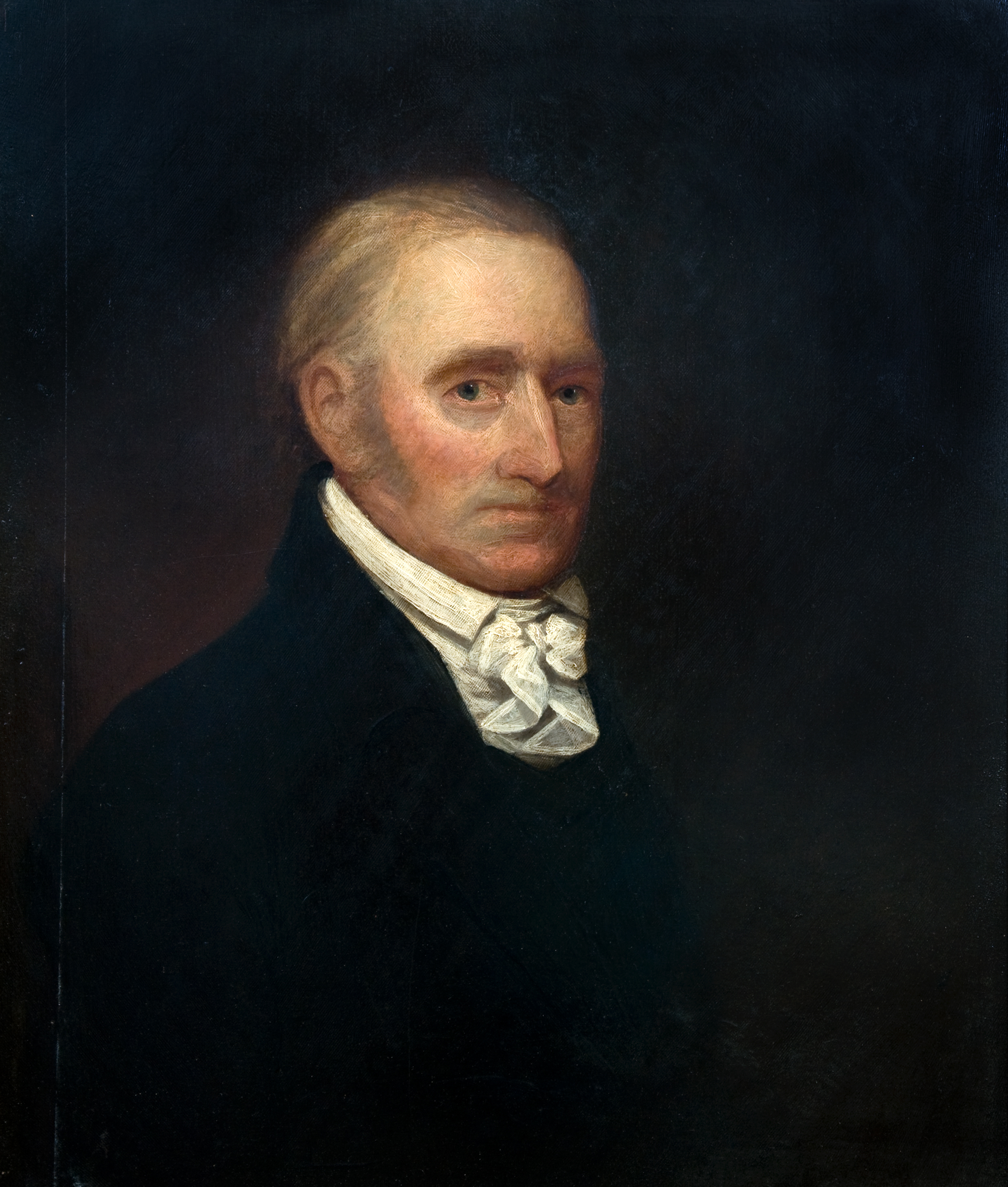
- Born: January 28, 1745; Annapolis, Maryland
- Died: May 8, 1808 (aged 63)
- Occupations: Merchant, planter, & real-estate developer
- Political party: Federalist
- Spouse: Prudence Carnan (m. 1771)
- Children: Sophia Gough
- Parent(s): Thomas Gough; Sophia Dorsey Gough

Harry Dorsey Gough (Note: Sometimes also spelled as Goff in period documents.) (28 January 1745 – 8 May 1808) was a prominent 18th-century merchant, planter, and patron of the fledgling Methodist Church in Baltimore, Maryland, in the early United States.

== Family and estate ==
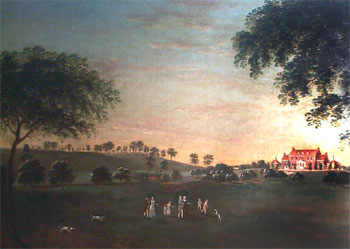
Perry Hall in an 1803 landscape by Francis Guy.

Harry's father was the English merchant Thomas Gough, who emigrated to the United States prior to the outbreak of its Revolution against Britain. As his new home was near Patapsco Ferry and his new wife had extensive holdings in the colonies, Thomas would later side with the revolutionaries against the Crown. Thomas had already married the American Sophia Dorsey, who bore him Harry on January 28, 1745, in Annapolis.

In addition to his father's wealth, Harry inherited £70,000 at a young age and became a successful merchant. The money came from his English half-brother John William Gough (1729–1767), by Thomas Gough's first wife Ann Brooksby. John's year-old son was subsequently brought to America and raised in Maryland. Confusingly, this nephew was also named Harry Dorsey Gough (1766–1807) and his son (1793–1867) would later also bear the same name.

The eldest Harry Dorsey Gough's estate eventually comprised 2,000 acres (810 ha) along the Great Gunpowder River northeast of Baltimore. Much of this was Corbin Lee's 1,000-acre (400 ha) plantation The Adventure, which Gough purchased for £5,000 in 1774 from Archibald Buchanan after Corbin's death in 1773. (Note: The deed was finalized on January 16, 1775.) He renamed it Perry Hall in honor of his family's ancestral home in Staffordshire and completed construction of its 16-room manor in 1776. Many years later, modern Baltimore's Bel Air Road (U.S. Route 1) was known as "Gough's Road" or "Perry Hall Road".

== Methodism and American Revolution ==
Coat of Arms of Henry Gough

In 1771, the 26-year-old Gough married the 18-year-old Prudence Carnan, sister of future governor Charles Ridgely. While her husband held raucous parties, she followed the lead of her aunt Rebecca Dorsey Ridgely in befriending Bishop Francis Asbury, the "Father of American Methodism". In 1775, Gough attended a Methodist camp meeting in Baltimore with his friends for the purpose of mocking the attendees; instead, he found himself moved and contemplating the meaning of his life and even suicide. He subsequently joined his wife in supporting them, befriending Asbury in March 1776 and building first a cabin and then the Camp Meeting Chapel off Perry Hall's eastern wing. Perry Hall was also where Asbury and Thomas Coke planned the Christmas Conference which established American Methodism in 1784.

During the American Revolution, Gough was a Nonjuror who declined to swear the oath of allegiance to the rebel government. As such, he was excluded from political office and even indicted in October 1778 for illegal preaching at his house chapel. (Many of the early Methodist exhorters returned to England during the Revolution and those who didn't, such as Asbury, were often suspected of Loyalist sympathies. Swearing the oath of allegiance was a necessary condition of leading a lawful religious assembly.)

== Postwar ==
After the Revolution, Gough swore the oath of allegiance and again became active in politics, philanthropy, and experimental farming. He was a member of the Federalist Party in the fledgling United States. He had already helped with Maryland's first Alms House in 1773; in 1806, he helped manage St. Peter's School, a Baltimore orphanage. He set about improving the livestock on his farm with European imports after the end of hostilities; in 1786, he was elected as the first president of the Society for the Encouragement and Improvement of Agriculture in Maryland and he may have been the first to import shorthorn bulls to America.

== Slave holdings ==
In this early period, Gough was one of the largest owners of slaves in Maryland, with around 70. Gough credited his own conversion to the touching sermon of thanksgiving he found being preached to his slaves by an African Methodist from a neighboring plantation. He subsequently took the abolitionist teachings of Wesley and the English Methodists to heart enough that he discontinued lifetime servitude on his lands, forming contracts with his slaves promising them freedom after a term of years (a "term slavery" similar to the earlier English indentured servants). Seeing "the injustice of detaining my fellow Creatures, in Slavery and Bondage", forty-five were manumitted in April 1780. His ties to Methodism and relatively generous treatment of these slaves have caused some to link Gough to "Black Harry" Hosier's otherwise unknown Baltimore master; a connection to the Goughs would also explain Hosier's close relationship with Bishop Asbury. Gough could nevertheless prove furious and merciless to runaways leaving before the end of their term: he offered $40 for the return of the runaway Will Bates, whom he called "a very ungrateful young rogue" and "an atrocious Ingrate" to make an example of him before his other term laborers. By 1804, Gough and other planters had passed legislation allowing them to increase the terms of their indentured servants' contracts in the event of runaways.

== Death ==
Gough's funeral was attended by over 2,000 mourners and presided over by Bishop Asbury. His estate was estimated to be worth $300,000 (~$8.9 million in 2024) and still included 51 enslaved laborers. His wife succeeded him by 14 years, dying on 23 June 1822. His only child was his daughter Sophia, who married James Mackubin or Maccubin. Mackubin later changed his name to Carroll as part of an inheritance and served as the executor of his father-in-law's estate. The related papers are maintained by the Maryland Historical Society.

== Legacy ==
- The Belair Road bridge over the Great Gunpowder River was named in his honor in 2004.
- In 2013, Gough Park opened in Perry Hall.

== See also ==
- Gough family
- U.S. Route 1 in Maryland
