= Stephen Salter (architect) =

English architect

Stephen Salter (30 May 1862 – 19 September 1956) was an English architect who practised in Oxford, Maidenhead, and the Isle of Wight.

== Family ==
Stephen Salter was born on 30 May 1862 at Isis House near what was Grandpont Yard in south Oxford, and his birth was announced in Jackson's Oxford Journal the following day. As this house was on the towpath of the south side of the River Thames, he was technically born in North Hinksey in Berkshire (which was in the Abingdon registration district) rather than in Oxford, and hence he was baptised at St Lawrence's Church, North Hinksey on 22 June. He was the only child of the boat-builder Stephen Salter senior who in 1858 had moved with his brother John from London to Oxford to take over Isaac King's boat-building firm at Folly Bridge, and who married Stephen's mother Emma Collingbourn at Wimbledon on 28 July 1860.

Stephen junior grew up at Egrove Farm near Kennington, Berkshire and continued to live with his parents after qualifying as an architect. In 1882 he moved with them to Westbrook at Pondwell on the Isle of Wight. By the beginning of 1891 he was appointed to the district committee for the St Helen's district of the Isle of Wight Conservative Association. He was a pigeon-fancier like his father, but on 26 November 1891 he wrote to Lady Oglander to say that his time had become more fully occupied with architectural work, and hence he had given up all connection with Cage Bird Societies.

On 18 April 1893 at St Mary's Church in Reading, Stephen Salter (aged 31), who was still living at Pondwell, married Florence Catherine Hart (aged 18), who lived at Castle Crescent, Reading and was the daughter of the sanitary engineer Robert Francis Hart. They settled at Sherborne Villa in Maidenhead, and their first child Ina Florence Salter was born in Maidenhead on 26 May 1894 and baptised at St Mary's Church in Reading on 11 September. After the birth his wife appears to have stayed in Maidenhead with baby Ina, while he occupied five rooms at his father's house at Pondwell on the Isle of Wight: the fact that he spent a good deal of time at Pondwell after his marriage is evidenced by the fact that in September 1894 he (unsuccessfully) applied to get added to the voters' list there as a resident.

By July 1899 Salter had expanded his architectural business to his home town of Oxford. Jackson's Oxford Journal described him as being "formerly of Oxford (and now of the firm of Davy and Salter, architects, of Oxford, Maidenhead and the Isle of Wight)" when on 18 November 1899 it reported that according to the current Tit-Bits magazine he had recently sold an owl pigeon for the enormous price of £100.

Very soon after this Salter and his family came to reside in Oxford, and their private address in Kelly's Directory for 1900 and 1901 was given as Clivedon, 193 Woodstock Road, Oxford (but Mrs Salter in her divorce petition fourteen years later stated that in 1900 they were living at 215 Woodstock Road).

At the time of the 1901 census Stephen Salter was boarding at the Fox Inn at Foxcombe Hill to the south-west of Oxford, while his wife Florence was boarding with their six-year-old daughter Ina at Crag Hall in Bournemouth.

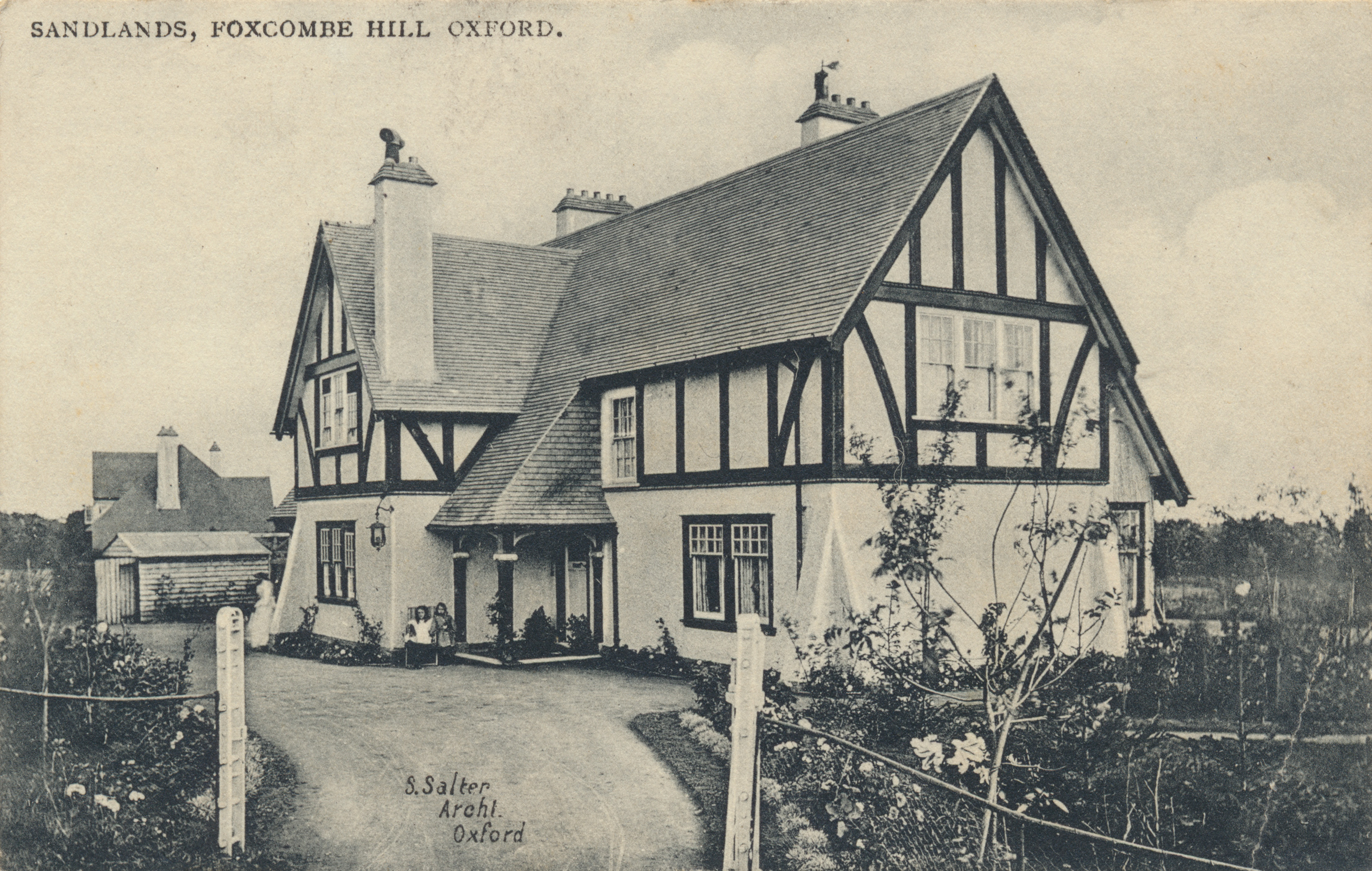
Sandlands at Foxcombe Hill, near Oxford, designed by Stephen Salter and also his home from about 1906 to 1908: this postcard shows his wife and two daughters

They were living at Foxcombe Hill just outside Oxford when their second child Joan Houlton Salter (registered with her middle spelt Holton) was born on 26 October 1901: she was baptised at New Hinksey Church on 30 July 1902. The house on Foxcombe Hill where they then lived was specified as Rose Bank in Kelly's Directory for 1904, 1905, and 1906. They then moved into the new house on that hill called Sandlands that Salter had himself designed. Their youngest child Stephen Cedric Salter (known as Cedric Stephen) was born at Sandlands on 30 January 1907 and baptised at Wootton, Berkshire on 27 February. The last listing of the family at Sandlands was in 1908.

Salter's major Oxford work on the north-east corner of Carfax for Lloyds Bank and two shops had been completed in 1903, but he continued to live in the Oxford area and design buildings there, including the Methodist chapel on the Cowley Road. When Robert Perks opened the latter in 1904, he described it as "the most artistic chapel to this day erected for the Wesleyans".

In 1909 and 1910 Kelly's Directory lists them as living at 223 Woodstock Road, Oxford.

Salter's mother Emma died on the Isle of Wight at the age of 73 in 1910.

The 1911 Kelly's Directory lists Stephen Salter as living in the village of Woodstock. It was probably published in 1910, and at the time of the 1911 census Salter and his wife and three children were living in a separate apartment of three rooms in a large 27-roomed boarding house at 97 St Aldate's Street in south Oxford with just one servant (a nurse for the children).

By 1912 Salter and his family had moved to 20 Park Crescent (now renumbered as 15 Park Town) in north Oxford.

On 24 November 1914 Stephen Salter's wife Florence petitioned for divorce, stating that her husband had been violent towards her since 1900 and had "frequently committed adultery with divers women". A decree nisi was granted on 25 March 1915, and the final decree on 18 October 1915: Stephen Salter's address was then given as Pondwell on the Isle of Wight, while Florence was still living at their home at Park Town in Oxford. Florence was granted custody of their two younger children. (Their eldest child, Ina, who was 20, had married Walter Menzies earlier that year with her father's permission.)

Salter was to remain on the Isle of Wight, where he was known as "Young Stephen", for the rest of his life. His former wife is hard to trace after 1915, and her son-in-law stated that she had committed suicide.

On Saturday 10 July 1937, Salter's second daughter Joan, Countess of Cardigan (who in 1924 had eloped from Oxford with Lord Cardigan, the heir to the Marquis of Ailesbury, when they were both minors) committed suicide at the Savoy Hotel in London at the age of 33. Just two months later on 15 September 1937 his father Stephen Salter senior died at Pondwell at the age of 103.

On 19 September 1956 Stephen Salter died at Albion Villa, The Diggings, St Helen's, Isle of Wight at the age of 94. His effects came to £11,765 8s. 5d., and his executor was his grandson, the Hon. Michael Sydney Cedric Brudenell-Bruce, Viscount Savernake.

== Career ==
In 1877 Stephen Salter was articled to Frederick Codd, Architect and Surveyor to the City of Oxford who in turn had been a pupil of William Wilkinson.

He received a thorough artist's training at the Ruskin School of Drawing in Oxford, and after assisting in various London and provincial architects' offices commenced practice at Pondwell, Ryde, Isle of Wight in 1885.

On 7 November 1892 Salter's application for a Fellowship of the Royal Institute of British Architects was approved, and he was elected a Fellow on 21 November 1892.

In 1893 he entered into partnership with Robert Clifton Davy of Maidenhead. By July 1899 Salter & Davy had established a new office in Oxford's High Street, with the address specified in Kelly's Directory of 1900 as being above the tailor's shop at 136 High Street, Oxford, which was practically opposite the new bank Salter was commissioned to design at 2 & 3 High Street. As soon as latter building was complete in 1902, the business moved into one of the many offices upstairs.

The partnership of "R. C. Davy and S. Salter, under the style of Davy and Salter, Oxford and Maidenhead, architects and surveyors" was dissolved near the beginning of 1906. Salter kept his office at 2–3 High Street until 1914, when he was expelled from the Royal Institute of British Architects and left Oxford, returning to the Isle of Wight.

== Works ==
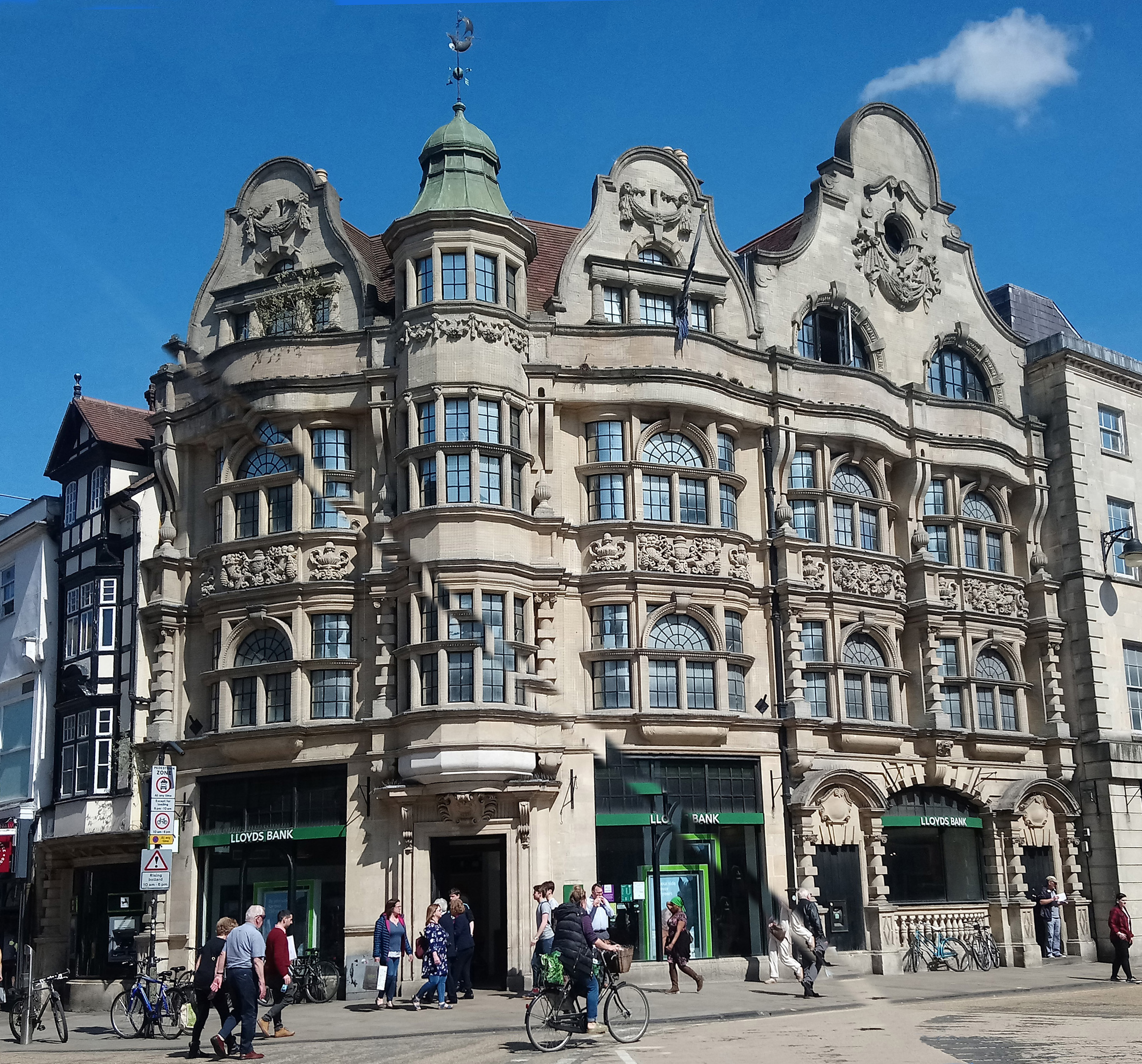
Lloyds Bank building at Carfax, Oxford, designed by Stephen Salter in two phases, 1901 and 1903

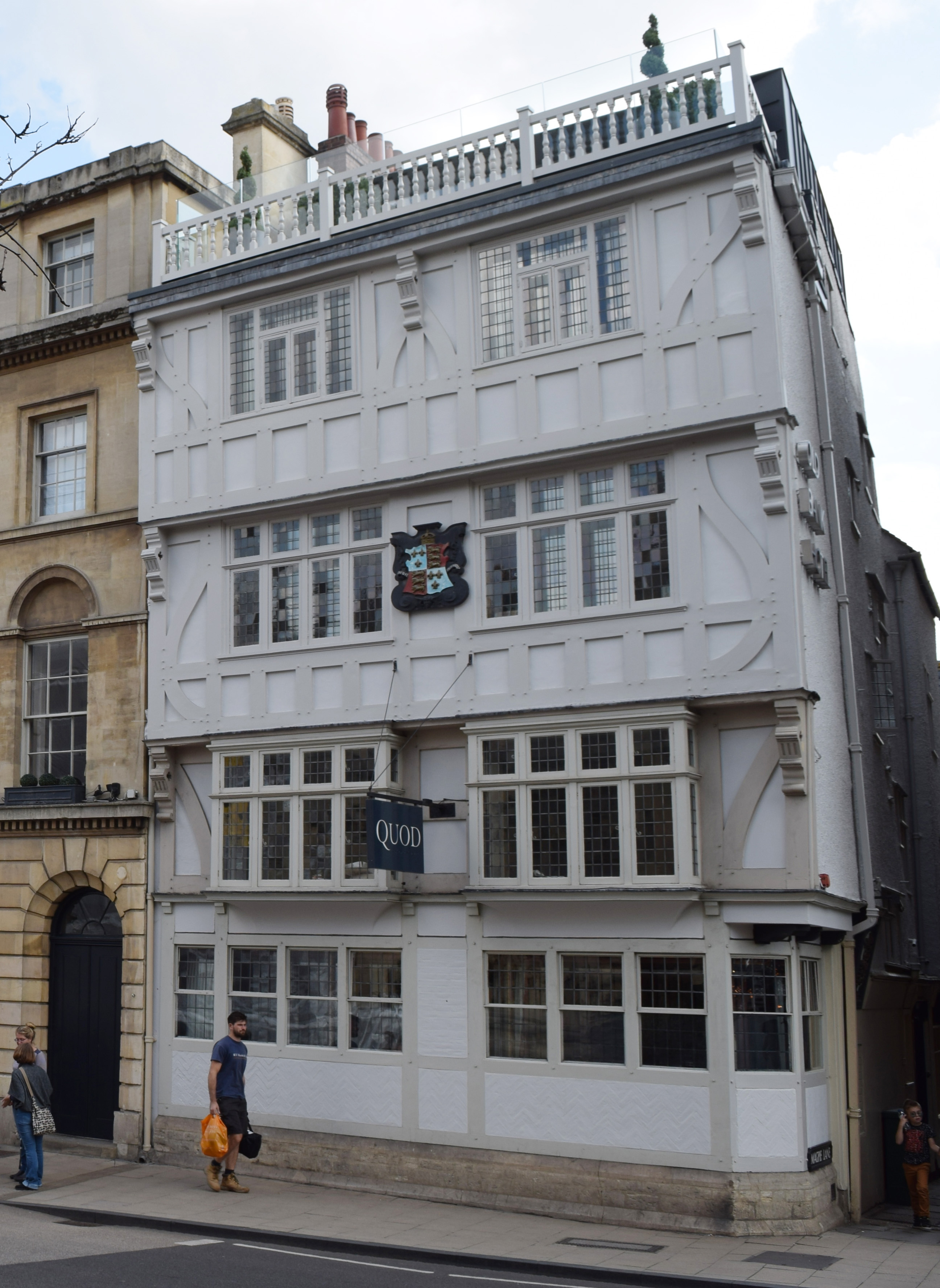
94 High Street, Oxford: designed by Stephen Salter as a shop in 1902, and now the Quod Restaurant

- Sydney Lodge, Springvale, near Ryde, Isle of Wight (1885)
- Hazeldene, High Park, Ryde, Isle of Wight (1888)
- Farm House, Nettlestone, near Seaview, Isle of Wight (1888)
- Clairvaux, St Helens, Isle of Wight (1889)
- Princes Mead, Nettlestone, Isle of Wight (1890)
- Alterations and additions to the residence of E. B. Procter, M.A., F.R.S., St Helens, Isle of Wight (1890)
- Village shops etc. at Nettlestone, Isle of Wight (1891)
- Alterations and additions to Westridge, near Ryde, Isle of Wight (1892)
- Woodlands Vale, a house off Calthorpe Road, Ryde, Isle of Wight; Half-timbered port-cochère (1893) and classical-style billiard room and detached stables (1894),
- "Seven Deadly Sins" at 37, 45, 47, 49, 51, 53, and 55 Shooter's Hill, Pangbourne (1896): Seven Gothic-style houses overlooking the River Thames built for the shop magnate D.H. Evans
- Woodlands Vale Lodge, Calthorpe Road, Ryde, Isle of Wight (1900)
- Buol's Restaurant at 21 Cornmarket, Oxford (1900)
- Boathouse with offices and waiting room on site of the old Boathouse Tavern at Salter's Slope, Folly Bridge, Oxford for Salter & Co's steam boats (1900/1)
- Lloyds Bank, 2 & 3 High Street, Oxford (1901), and completion of the same building at the corner of Carfax (initially for two shops but later also occupied by the bank) at 1 High Street and 1 Cornmarket Street (1903)
- Large block of buildings for the Earl of Berkeley at Boars Hill (1901), including chemical and physical laboratories, distilling room, dairy, laundry, and engine room
- Half-timbered shop at 94 High Street, Oxford (1902), now the Quod Restaurant
- Coronation Villas, 20 & 22 Chilswell Road, Oxford (1902)
- Wesley Hall, Cowley Road, Oxford (now Cowley Road Methodist Church (1903)
- Sandlands, Foxcombe Hill, near Oxford (1905)
- Moyle House, Fleet Hill, Finchampstead, Berkshire built for the Revd Routh Tomlinson (1907)
- 2–4 Charlbury Road, Oxford (1908)
- North Oxford Skating Rink, Osberton Road (1909)
- Residence for the Duc d'Elchingen (1911), not yet located
- 56 Kings Road, Windsor (1912)
- South chapel and south aisle of St Peter's Church, Seaview, Isle of Wight (1920): a memorial to the men of the village who had fallen in the 1914–1918 war
