= Somerset Gough-Calthorpe, 7th Baron Calthorpe =

British peer, soldier and politician (1831-1912)

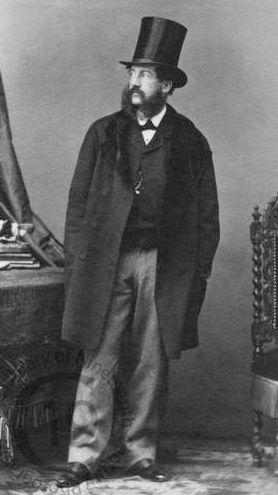
7th Baron Calthorpe in 1860

Somerset John Gough-Calthorpe, 7th Baron Calthorpe KCB JP (23 January 1831 – 16 November 1912), was a British peer, soldier and politician.

Calthorpe was the fifth but third surviving son of Frederick Gough, 4th Baron Calthorpe and Lady Charlotte Somerset, daughter of the 6th Duke of Beaufort. He joined the 8th Hussars in 1849, rising to Brevet major by 1855. During the Crimean War he served as ADC to Lord Raglan. Lord Cardigan sued Calthorpe for his eyewitness account of the Charge of the Light Brigade in his memoir Letters from Headquarters, Or Realities of the War in the Crimea, but the action failed. He became lieutenant-colonel in 1861, commanding the 5th Dragoon Guards. He was the first chairman of the Isle of Wight County Council, and was a JP both there and in his native Midlands.

Two years before his own death, he succeeded his elder brother Augustus (1829–1910) as Baron Calthorpe in 1910.

== Marriage and issue ==
In 1862, Calthorpe married Eliza Maria Chamier, only child of Captain Chamier RN and widow of Captain Frederick Crewe. They had two sons and two daughters:

- Hon. Somerset Frederick (1862–1940), succeeded as 8th Baron Calthorpe
- Admiral of the Fleet Honourable Sir Hon. Somerset Arthur (1864–1937), a Royal Navy officer; married in 1900 Annie Euphemia "Effie" Dunsmuir, daughter of Robert Dunsmuir, of Craigdarroch Castle, Victoria, B.C.
- Hon. Leila Mabel (11 September 1866 – 18 November 1933)
- Hon. Leila Evelyn (6 February 1871 – 29 February 1956), married in 1899, Cecil Grosvenor Wilson (later Wilson-Heathcote)

The Lady chapel at St John's Church in Oakfield on the Isle of Wight was built as a memorial to him in 1914.

== Arms ==
Coat of arms of Somerset Gough-Calthorpe, 7th Baron Calthorpe
Crest 1st: A Boar's Head couped at the neck Azure (Calthorpe); 2nd: A Boar's Head couped Argent pierced through the cheek with a Broken Spear Gules (Gough) Escutcheon Quarterly: 1st and 4th, Checky Or and Azure a Fess Ermine (Calthorpe); 2nd and 3rd, Gules on a Fess Argent between three Boars' Heads couped Or a Lion passant Azure (Gough) Supporters On either side a Wild Man proper his Hair and Beard Sable wreathed about the head and waist with Oak Vert fructed Or the exterior hand holding a Club erect of the last Motto Gradu Diverso Via Una (The same way by different steps)

Peerage of Great Britain
Preceded by Augustus Gough-Calthorpe	Baron Calthorpe; 1910–1912	Succeeded by Somerset Gough-Calthorpe
