= Oakfield, Isle of Wight =

Coordinates: 50.7204°N 1.1558°W

Oakfield
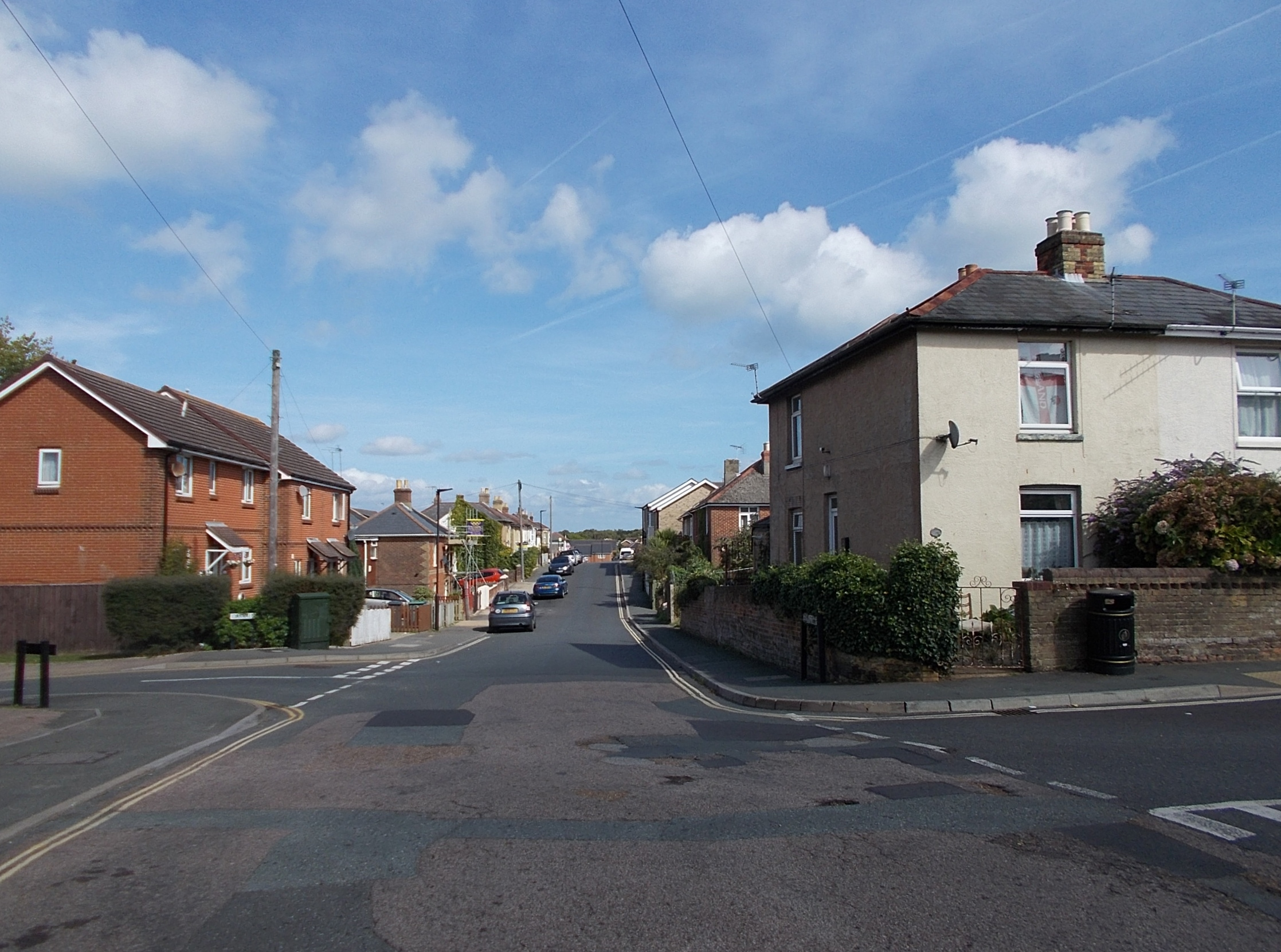
- High Street, Oakfield

- Location within the Isle of Wight
- OS grid reference: SZ5991
- Civil parish: Ryde
- Unitary authority: Isle of Wight
- Ceremonial county: Isle of Wight
- Region: South East
- Country: England
- Sovereign state: United Kingdom
- Police: Hampshire and Isle of Wight
- Fire: Hampshire and Isle of Wight
- Ambulance: Isle of Wight
- UK Parliament: Isle of Wight East

Oakfield is a suburb of the town of Ryde on the Isle of Wight, England. Historically part of the St Helens parish, it was absorbed into Ryde Borough in 1933 and in turn into Medina Borough in 1974. Oakfield largely consists of light industrial units and various developments of social housing.

The area bounded by High Street, School Street and Reed Street was re-developed in the late 1960s and early 1970s, with Victorian stone-built cottages demolished to make way for local authority flats and houses. Also demolished was the Oakfield Junior School, in High Park Square, built to a design by Thomas Hellyer. Earlier local authority housing (pre and post war) exists in Harding Road, and later council-built properties can be found in Slade Road. The most recent development is OakVale, whose metal-clad walls dominate views from many other parts of Ryde. Victorian properties remain in parts of High Street, St John's Hill, Wood Street and Meaders Road as well as in Upper and Lower Highland Roads.

In the 1960s Oakfield had its own butcher, a barbers shop, several pubs and the well-patronised Renown Fish Bar. June's greengrocer shop on the corner of Meaders Road and St Johns Hill was used as a location in the 1973 film That'll be the Day, featuring Ringo Starr and Rosemary Leach. Few of these businesses remain, although the chip shop survives under a different name.

The church of St John, also designed by Hellyer, whilst described as being in Oakfield, would generally be considered to be outside the area, understood as being bounded by Alexandra Road to the east, St Johns Hill to the north, the Ryde to Shanklin Railway to the west, and open countryside to the south.

== See also ==
- St. John's Church, Oakfield, Ryde
