= Calthorpe Park =

Public park in Birmingham, England

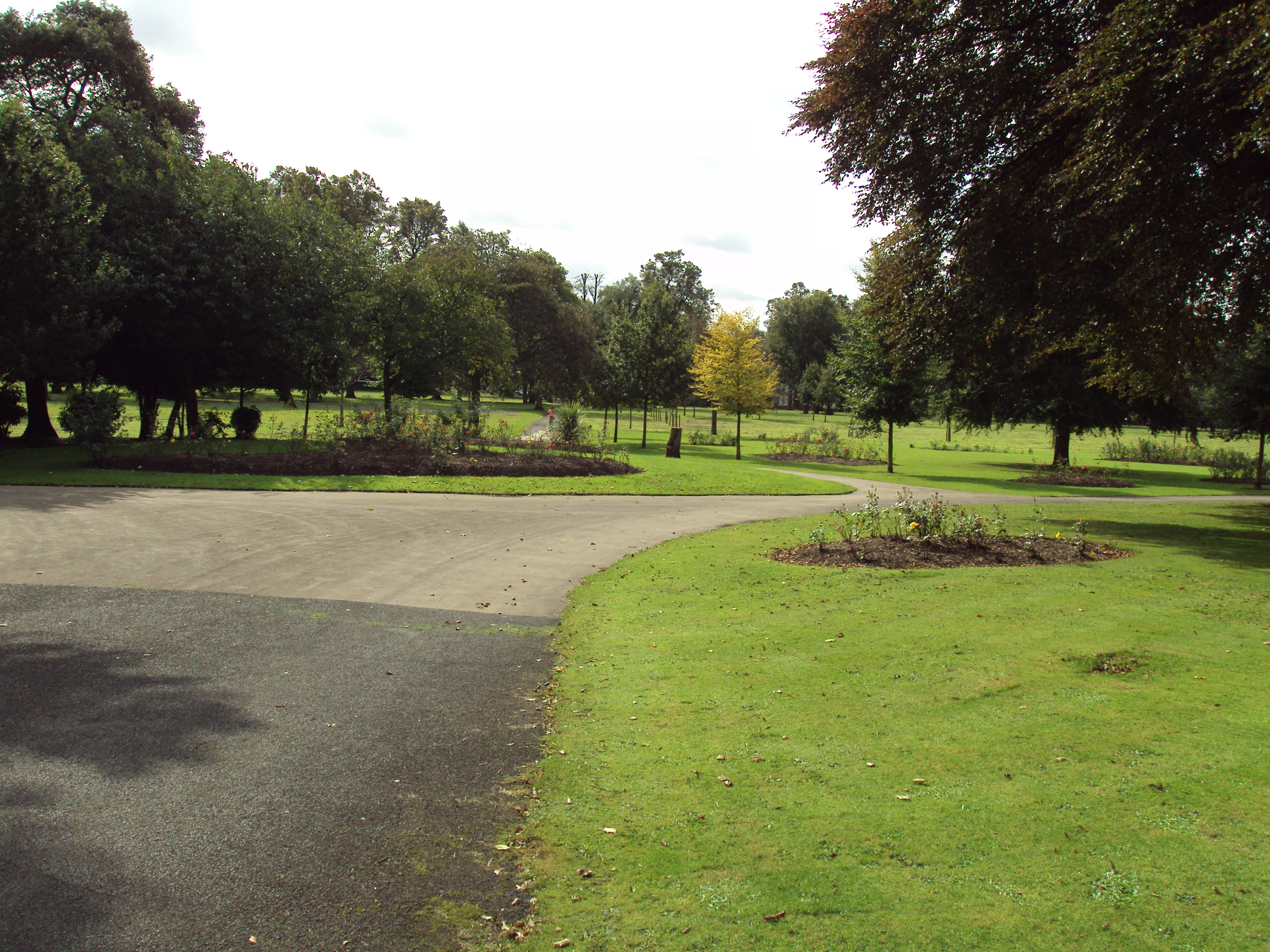
- The park in September 2009
- Interactive map of Calthorpe Park
- Type: Public park
- Location: Edgbaston, Birmingham, England
- Coordinates: 52.4604°N 1.8999°W
- Created: 1857
- Operator: Birmingham City Council

Calthorpe Park is a public park in Birmingham, England, created in 1857 and managed by Birmingham City Council.

== Geography ==
The park lies in the city council ward of Balsall Heath West, adjacent to and east of the A441 Pershore Road, a short distance south of the Birmingham Middle Ring Road (A4540) and north of Edgbaston Cricket Ground.

The River Rea bisects the park, following south-west to north-east and crossed by two bridges.

== History ==
The park takes its name from the Calthorpe family, whose Frederick Gough, 4th Baron Calthorpe provided the land for its creation in 1857, from the Calthorpe Estate. The freehold was signed over by his son, Augustus Gough-Calthorpe, 6th Baron Calthorpe, in 1894.

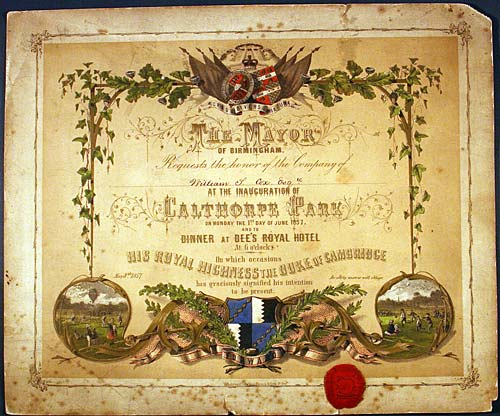
Invitation to the opening, issued to William Sands Cox, founder of Queen's Hospital

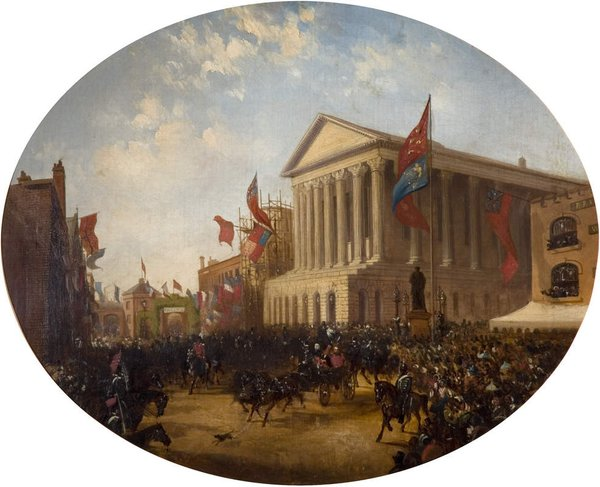
The Duke of Cambridge Leaving the Town Hallby Samuel Lines Snr.

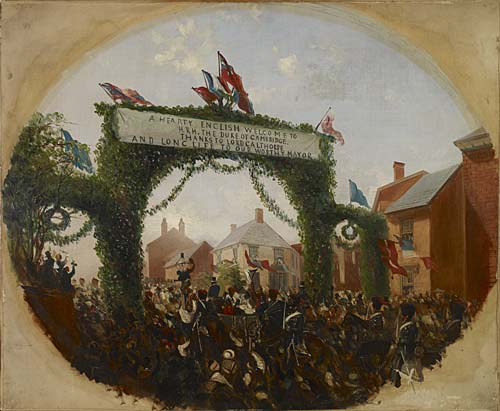
Painting by Samuel Lines Snr.

The park was formally opened on 1 June 1857, by Prince George, Duke of Cambridge. The opening ceremony, which featured a triumphal arch, was recorded in a painting by Samuel Lines Snr.

After a lunch at the Town Hall, and arriving via a procession through the streets, the Duke, Lord Calthorpe, and the Mayor, John Ratcliffe, each planted a Cedar tree.

The event was followed by a dinner for the dignitaries and 250 guests at Bee's Royal Hotel, as well as a free concert "for artisans" at the Town Hall, a free ball at a music hall in Coleshill Street and a free meal for 700 soldiers and pensioners at Bingley Hall. These events were funded by John Ratcliffe.

== Features ==
A lodge-house sits at the north-western corner of the park. A bandstand formerly stood near to it.

An 1855 statue of Robert Peel by Peter Hollins, which formerly stood in the park, is now outside the nearby Tally Ho! police training centre, although the original plinth is still in the park.
