= Harry Gough =

British merchant and politician (1681–1751)

Captain Harry Gough (2 April 1681 – 13 July 1751), of Enfield, Middlesex, was a British merchant and politician who sat in the House of Commons from 1734 to 1751.

Gough was the sixth son of Sir Henry Gough of Perry Hall and his wife Mary Littleton, daughter of Sir Edward Littleton, 2nd Baronet, MP of Pillaton, Staffordshire.

Gough went to China with his uncle Richard Gough in 1692 when aged 11, and joined the British East India Company under his patronage. From 1707 to 1715 he was captain of a merchantman, the Streatham. He was named Deputy Chairman in 1736, full Chairman the next year, and then repeatedly held each post (Chairman again in 1741, 1743, 1746, and 1747; Deputy again in 1742, 1745, and 1750).

Gould was returned by his cousin Sir Harry Gough as member of Parliament for Bramber, a notoriously rotten borough, at the 1734 British general election and voted consistently with the Administration. He was returned again in 1741 and 1747 attending debates assiduously in spite of gout.

Gough died on 13 July 1751, leaving a son and daughter. His son was the antiquarian, Richard Gough.

== See also ==
- Gough-Calthorpe family

Parliament of Great Britain
Preceded by James Hoste; Joseph Danvers	Member of Parliament for Bramber; 1734–1751; With: Sir Harry Gough 1734-1741; Thomas Archer 1741-1747; Joseph Damer 1747-1754	Succeeded by Joseph Damer; Henry Pelham
