= Benjamin Carpenter (British Army officer) =

British Army general

General Benjamin Carpenter
- Born: c. 1713/14
- Died: 8 March 1788; Hyde Park, London, England
- Military career
- Allegiance: United Kingdom
- Branch: British Army
- Rank: General
- Commands: 2nd Troop of Horse Guards; 12th Regiment of Dragoons; 4th Regiment of Dragoons

Benjamin Carpenter (born c. 1713/14 – 8 March 1788) was a British soldier and courtier.

The son of Colonel Robert Carpenter, who was killed at the head of the 3rd Foot Guards at the Battle of Fontenoy in 1745, Benjamin Carpenter was for many years an officer of the 2nd Troop of Horse Guards, in which corps he rose to the rank of lieutenant-colonel. In November 1760 he was promoted to the rank of colonel, and appointed aide-de-camp to the King. He was promoted to the rank of major-general in 1762, and obtained the colonelcy of the 12th Regiment of Dragoons in 1764, from which he was removed to the 4th Regiment of Dragoons on 24 October 1770.

He was a great favourite with King George III, to whom he was made an equerry on 16 December 1760. He was appointed clerk marshal of the mews on 6 April 1771 and principal equerry in the royal establishment on 1 January 1783. Carpenter was promoted to the rank of lieutenant-general in 1772, and to that of general in 1783. Aged 75, he became so depressed that his doctor ordered his servants to watch him closely. However, he escaped from them and went to Hyde Park, where he drowned himself in the Serpentine river at about 5 AM on 8 March 1788.

Benjamin Carpenter was married to Mary, youngest daughter and co-heiress of Lieutenant-Colonel Timothy Carr; they had two daughters:

- Lucy (1760—1842) who married Captain George Ramsden, 15th Light Dragoons, and by him had three sons; and
- Frances (1761—1827) who married Henry Gough-Calthorpe, 1st Baron Calthorpe.

The two daughters were the subject of a 1771 portrait in crayons by Pierre-Joseph Lion.

Military offices
Preceded by Edward Harvey	Colonel of the 12th (The Prince of Wales's); Regiment of (Light) Dragoons; 1764–1770	Succeeded by William Augustus Pitt
Preceded by Hon. Henry Seymour Conway	Colonel of the 4th Regiment of Dragoons; 1770–1788	Succeeded by The Lord Howard de Walden
