= Elvetham Hall =

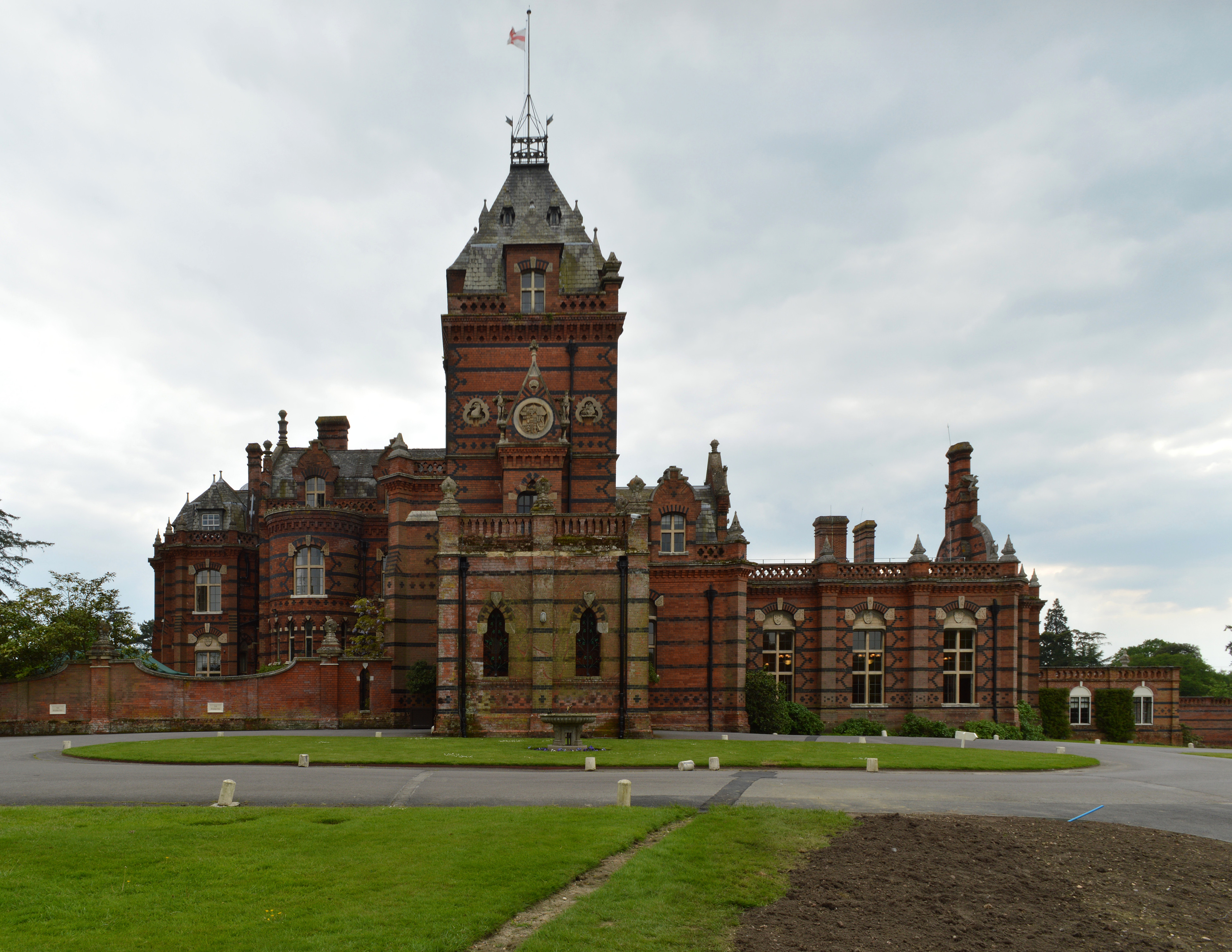
- Elvetham Hall

- Location within Hampshire

General information
- Type: English country house
- Architectural style: Gothic Revival
- Location: Hartley Wintney, Fleet Road, Hartley Wintney, Hook, RG27 8AS, England
- Coordinates: 51°18′05″N 0°52′47″W
- Construction started: 1859
- Completed: 1862

Technical details
- Material: polychromatic brick walls with stone dressings; slate roofs

Design and construction
- Architect: Samuel Sanders Teulon

Other information
- Public transit: Reading Buses route 7; Stagecoach South route 7

Website
- www.elvethamhotel.co.uk

Listed Building – Grade II*
- Official name: Elvetham Hall House
- Designated: 19 July 1973
- Reference no.: 1092322

Elvetham Hall is a hotel in Hampshire, England, in the parish of Hartley Wintney about 2 miles (3 km) northwest of Fleet. The building is a High Victorian Gothic Revival English country house and a Grade II* listed building. It stands in a landscaped park that is Grade II listed.

== Architecture ==
The house was built in 1859–62 for the 4th Baron Calthorpe. It was designed by Samuel Sanders Teulon, who was noted for his polychrome brickwork. It is built of red brick and stone dressing, with bands and decoration in black brick. It is an ornate design with hipped and mansard roofs with gables and dormers, tall brick chimneys and an entrance front dominated by a tall tower. The interior is notable for its fireplaces.

The house has a porte-cochère that was added in 1901 and a dining room that was added in 1911. Both are designed "deceivingly" to match the original house.

The architectural historians Nikolaus Pevsner and David Lloyd called Elvetham Hall "A major house of [Teulon], but not one anybody would praise for beauty". Another architectural historian, Mark Girouard, called it "the holiest or unholiest of zebras, being not only striped, but also zigzagged and diapered all over with bricks, and slates of different colours... like an enormous multi-coloured jelly".

== Estate ==
The 300-acre (120 ha) Elvetham estate was established by Sir William Sturmy in 1403 after inheriting the possessions of his uncle Sir Henry Sturmy in 1381. He died there in 1427 and the estate, along with his main seat at Wulfhall in Wiltshire, passed to his son-in-law John Seymour. It passed down in the Seymour family and was visited by Elizabeth I, who planted an oak tree that still stands in the park.

The estate passed to the Calthorpe family in the middle of the 17th century. The original manor house burnt down in 1840.

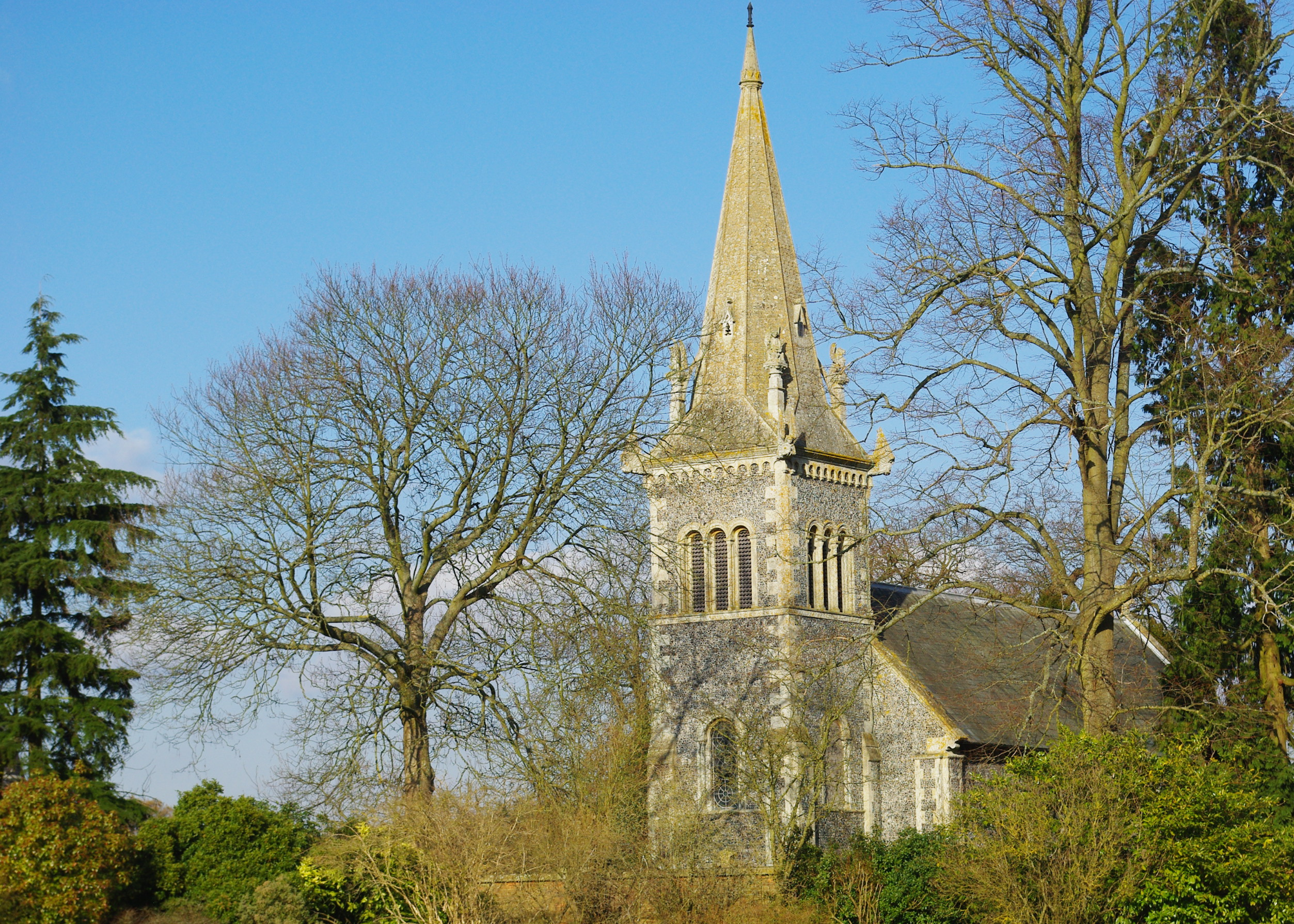
St Mary's church in the grounds of Elvetham Hall

A Church of England parish church was built on the estate in 1840–41. It is in Norman revival style and faced with flint. It has a broach spire that may have been added by Teulon. The church is east of the current house. It is no longer used for worship.

Frederick Gough, 4th Baron Calthorpe inherited the estate in 1851 and had the present house built in 1859–62. He died there in 1868, after which the estate and house passed in turn to his sons Frederick Gough-Calthorpe, 5th Baron Calthorpe and Augustus Gough-Calthorpe, 6th Baron Calthorpe. The latter established in 1900 what has become a noted herd of shorthorn cattle. His Southdown sheep and Berkshire pigs were also famous.

In 1953 the Hall and gardens were sold to ICI, then to Lansing Bagnall of Basingstoke. The gardens were restored in 1962 when a croquet lawn and tennis courts were laid out. The hall was run as a conference centre in the 1960s but is now a hotel.

== Air crash ==
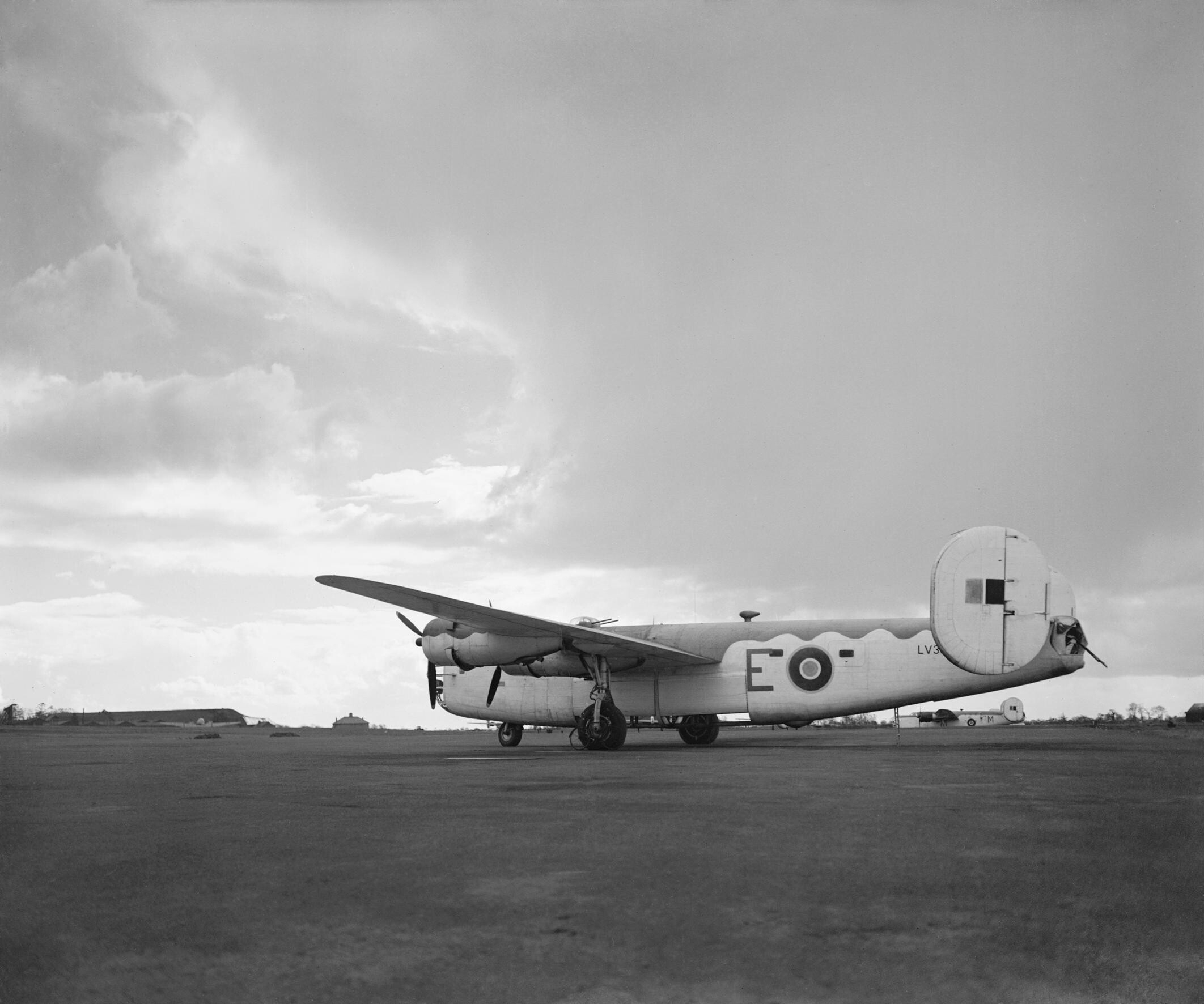
An RAF Consolidated Liberator GR.VI: the same model as the Liberator that crashed at Elvetham

On 5 October 1945 a Consolidated Liberator GR.VI transport aircraft of No. 311 Squadron RAF crashed in a field on the estate, killing all 23 people aboard shortly after takeoff from RAF Blackbushe on a flight to Ruzyně Airport, Prague.

The Liberator's five crew and eighteen passengers were Free Czechoslovaks returning home after the end of the German occupation of Czechoslovakia. The passengers included the wife of the flight engineer and five small children travelling with their mothers.

== Bibliography ==
- Pevsner, Nikolaus; Lloyd, David (1967). Hampshire and the Isle of Wight. The Buildings of England. Harmondsworth: Penguin Books.
- Physick, John; Darby, Michael (1973). Marble Halls – Drawings and Models of Victorian Secular Buildings. Eyre & Spottiswoode. ISBN 978-0-90148-6684.
