= Henry Gough-Calthorpe, 1st Baron Calthorpe =

British politician and peer (1749–1798)

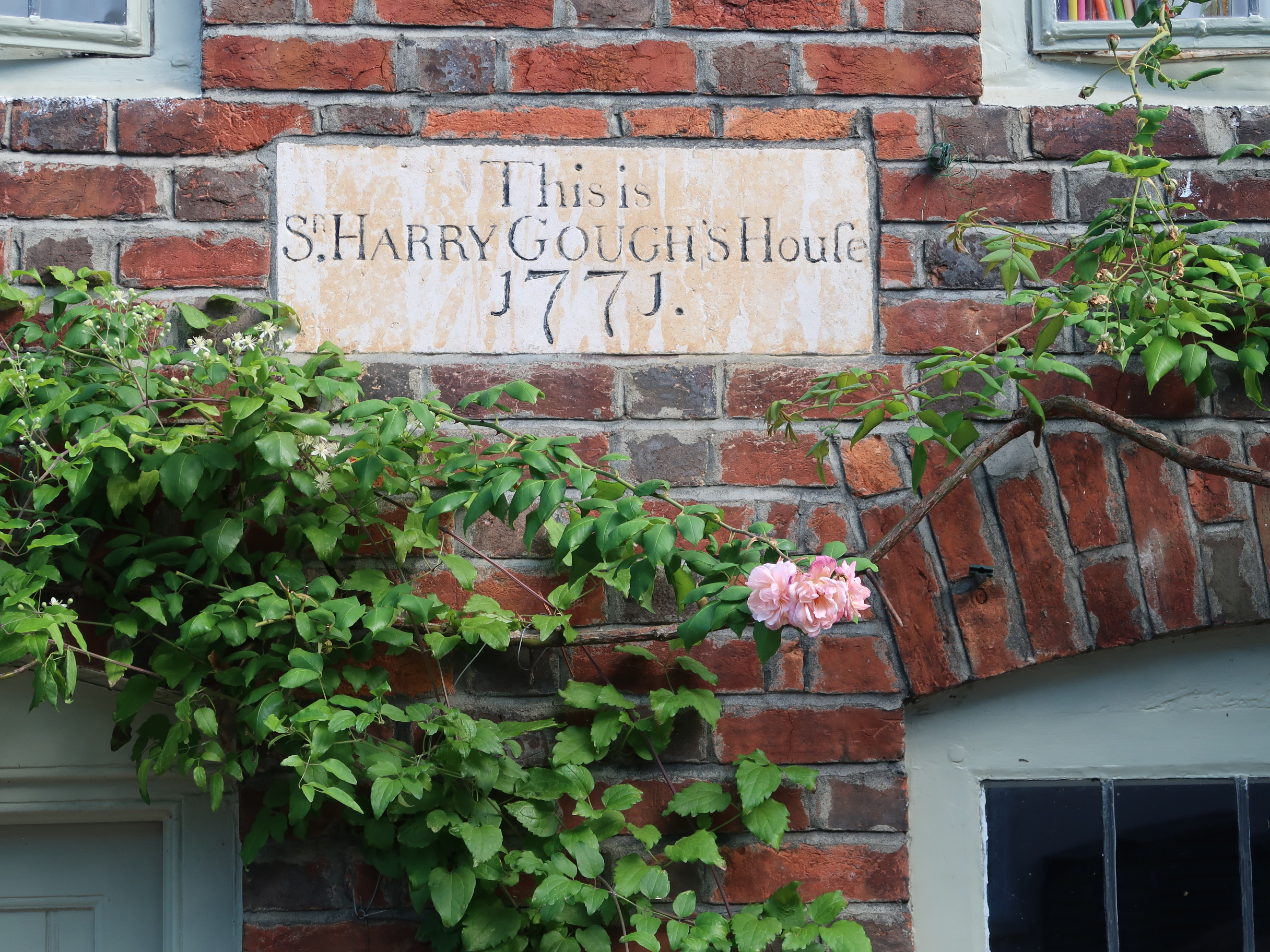
Sir Harry Gough's House, 23 Church Street, Steyning

Henry Gough-Calthorpe, 1st Baron Calthorpe (1 January 1749 – 16 March 1798), known until 1796 as Sir Henry Gough, 2nd Baronet, was a British politician who sat in the House of Commons from 1774 to 1796 when he was raised to the peerage.

== Early life ==
Gough was the son of Barbara Calthorpe, the only daughter of Reynolds Calthorpe of Hampshire and second wife of Sir Henry Gough, 1st Baronet. He was educated at Eton College from 1762 to 1767, followed by Oriel College, Oxford in 1767 and the University of Edinburgh from 1768 to 1769. On 8 June 1774 he succeeded to his father's title and estates.

== Political career ==
In the 1774 general election, Gough was returned as the Member of Parliament for Bramber, a rotten borough controlled by his family. He was returned again in 1780 and 1784. He took the additional surname of Calthorpe by royal licence in 1788 on succeeding to the estates of his maternal uncle, Sir Henry Calthorpe. Previously an independent member, from 1788 he was a supporter of William Pitt the Younger. He was returned again for Bramber in 1790. In 1791 he opposed the repeal of the Test Act in Scotland and in March 1796 he voted against abolition of the slave trade. On 16 June 1796, he was created Baron Calthorpe, of Calthorpe in the County of Norfolk, in the Peerage of Great Britain, and gave up his seat in the House of Commons. He had first applied for a peerage in 1789.

== Family ==
On 1 May 1783, Gough-Calthorpe married Frances Carpenter, the second daughter and co-heiress of General Benjamin Carpenter. They had eight children:

- Henry Gough-Calthorpe (24 January 1784 – 4 November 1790, predeceasing his father)
- Hon. Charles Gough-Calthorpe, later 2nd Baron Calthorpe (1786–1807)
- Hon. George Gough-Calthorpe, later 3rd Baron Calthorpe (1787–1851)
- Hon. Frederick Gough-Calthorpe later Frederick Gough, 4th Baron Calthorpe (1790–1868)
- Hon. John Gough-Calthorpe (5 May 1793 – 10 June 1816)
- Hon. Arthur Gough-Calthorpe (14 November 1796 – 5 March 1836)
- Hon. Frances Elizabeth Gough-Calthorpe (c. 1785 – 2 September 1868)
- Hon. Harriet Gough-Calthorpe (died 12 February 1813)

The first baron was succeeded in the baronetcy, his eldest son having predeceased him, by his next three sons in turn. The widowed Lady Calthorpe took up residence in Grosvenor Square. She died on 1 May 1827, while visiting Brighton.

== Arms ==
Coat of arms of Henry Gough-Calthorpe, 1st Baron Calthorpe
Crest 1st: A Boar's Head couped at the neck Azure (Calthorpe); 2nd: A Boar's Head couped Argent pierced through the cheek with a Broken Spear Gules (Gough) Escutcheon Quarterly: 1st and 4th, Checky Or and Azure a Fess Ermine (Calthorpe); 2nd and 3rd, Gules on a Fess Argent between three Boars' Heads couped Or a Lion passant Azure (Gough) Supporters On either side a Wild Man proper his Hair and Beard Sable wreathed about the head and waist with Oak Vert fructed Or the exterior hand holding a Club erect of the last Motto Gradu Diverso Via Una (The same way by different steps)

Parliament of Great Britain
Preceded by Thomas Thoroton; Charles Ambler	Member of Parliament for Bramber; 1774–1796; With: Thomas Thoroton 1774-1782; Hon. Henry Fitzroy Stanhope 1782-1784; Hon. Henry Fitzroy Stanhope 1784-1788; Robert Hobart 1788-1790; Thomas Coxhead 1790-1796	Succeeded by Sir Charles Rouse-Boughton; James Adams
Peerage of Great Britain
New creation	Baron Calthorpe; 1796–1798	Succeeded by Charles Gough-Calthorpe
Baronetage of Great Britain
Preceded by Henry Gough	Baronet (of Edgbaston); 1774–1798	Succeeded by Charles Gough-Calthorpe
