= Frederick Gough, 4th Baron Calthorpe =

British peer and Member of Parliament (1790–1868)

Frederick Gough, 4th Baron Calthorpe (14 June 1790 – 2 May 1868), known as Hon. Frederick Gough-Calthorpe until 1851, of Elvetham Hall, Hartley Wintney, Hampshire, was a British peer and Member of Parliament.

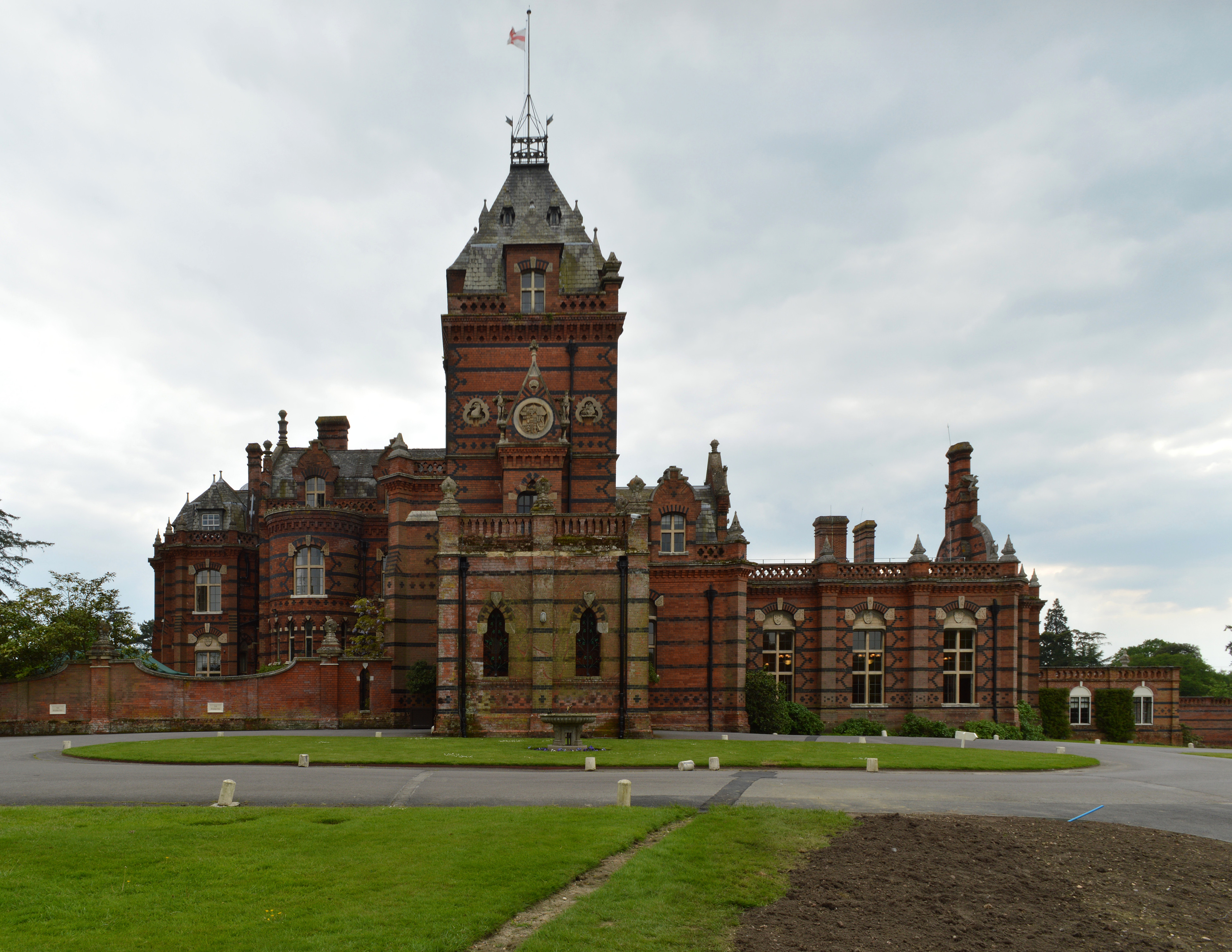
Elvetham Hall, Hampshire

He was born the 4th son of Henry Gough-Calthorpe, 1st Baron Calthorpe, and succeeded his elder brother (the youngest of his three elder brothers to die before him) as the 4th Baronet in 1851.

He was elected Member of Parliament for Hindon in 1818, holding the seat until 1826. He was then elected to represent Bramber from 1826 to 1831. In 1845 he changed his surname by royal licence from Gough-Calthorpe to Gough. He was appointed High Sheriff of Staffordshire for 1848–1849 (the family also owned Perry Hall in Perry Barr, then in Staffordshire).

== Marriage and issue ==
Calthorpe married in 1823 Lady Charlotte Sophia Somerset, the daughter of Henry Somerset, 6th Duke of Beaufort, and had four sons and six daughters.

- Hon. Charlotte Frances Georgiana (10 May 1824 – 18 August 1870), married in 1850, Francis Joseph Cresswell (1 Nov 1822 - 19 Sep 1882)
- Henry William (13 – 25 May 1825), died in childhood
- Hon. Frederick Henry William (1826–1893), succeeded as 5th Baron Calthorpe
- George Arthur (20 August 1827 – 20 Νοvember 1843), died young "after a painful illness"
- Hon. Frances Blanche Anne (11 Νοvember 1828 – 17 April 1899), married in 1861, the Rev. John Robert Feilden, Vicar of Honingham, Norfolk
- Hon. Augustus Cholmondeley Gough-Calthorpe (8 November 1829 – 22 July 1910), succeeded as 6th Baron Calthorpe
- Lt.-Gen. Hon. Somerset John (1831–1912), married in 1862, Eliza Maria Crewe, only child of the late Capt. Frederick Chamier; succeeded as 7th Baron Calthorpe
- Hon. Harriet Louisa Esther (5 July 1832 – 20 July 1901), married in 1857 Lord Alfred Spencer-Churchill
- Hon. Isabel Eleanor Mary (1 July 1833 – 20 December 1896), died unmarried
- Hon. Olivia Georgiana Elizabeth (31 August 1834 – 18 May 1887), died unmarried
- Hon. Susan Caroline (12 August 1837 – 11 October 1906), died unmarried

He died in 1868 and was succeeded in turn by his three surviving sons.

Parliament of the United Kingdom
| Preceded by William Thomas Beckford; Thomas Hobhouse | Member of Parliament for Hindon; 1818–1826; With: William Thomas Beckford (1818–20); John Plummer (1820–1826) | Succeeded by George Fortescue; John Weyland |
| Preceded by John Irving; Arthur Gough-Calthorpe | Member of Parliament for Bramber; 1826–1831; With: John Irving | Succeeded by John Irving; William Stratford Dugdale |
Peerage of Great Britain
| Preceded by George Gough-Calthorpe | Baron Calthorpe; 1851–1868 | Succeeded by Frederick Gough-Calthorpe |
