= Sir Henry Gough, 1st Baronet =

British merchant and politician (1709–1774)

Sir Henry Gough, 1st Baronet (1709–1774), also known as Sir Harry Gough, of Edgbaston Hall, Warwickshire, was a British merchant and politician who sat in the House of Commons from 1732 to 1741.

== Early life ==
Gough was the son of Sir Richard Gough of Edgbaston Hall, Warwickshire, and Gough House, Chelsea, and his wife Ann Crisp, daughter of Nicholas Crisp of Chiswick, Middlesex. He was admitted at Corpus Christi College, Cambridge and at Inner Temple in 1725. He became a merchant in the East India Company. He succeeded his father who died on 9 February 1728, and was created a baronet, of Edgbaston on 6 April 1728. Soon after succeeding his father he bought two more burgages at Bramber, a rotten borough, giving him full control of the seat, for which he thenceforth could nominate both Members. He married Catherine Harpur, daughter of Sir John Harpur, 4th Baronet, of Calke, Derbyshire.

== Career ==
Gough was returned as Member of Parliament for Totnes on the government interest at a by-election on 25 January 1732. He supported the Government and voted for the excise bill. At the 1734 British general election he returned himself as MP for Bramber with his cousin Harry Gough. He continued to vote with the Government and retired at the 1741 British general election.

Gough's first wife Catherine died on 22 June 1740 and he married, as his second wife, Barbara Calthorpe (c. 1716 – 1782), on 2 July 1741. She was the heiress of Reynolds Calthorpe of Elvetham, Hampshire. Barbara was also the matrilineal 10th-great granddaughter of Anne of York, sister of Richard III of England, whose mitochondrial DNA lineage would prove useful in identifying the remains of her brother.

== Death and legacy ==
Gough died on 8 June 1774 leaving six children by his second wife. He was succeeded in the baronetcy by his son Henry, who became Henry Gough-Calthorpe upon his inheritance of his maternal uncle's lands in 1788 and was created 1st Baron Calthorpe in 1796.

Gough also had two daughters, Barbara and Charlotte Gough, also known as Gough-Calthorpe. The former (c. 1745 – 1826) married in 1770 Isaac Spooner, a wealthy Birmingham businessman, and bore ten children, including Barbara Spooner, who married abolitionist William Wilberforce, and Anne Spooner (1780–1873), who married in 1809 The Rev. Edward Vansittart Neale, Rector of Taplow in Buckinghamshire, and had eight children, including Edward Vansittart Neale, one of the Founders of the Co-Operative Society, and Charlotte Vansittart Neale (1817–1881), married in 1841 to Charles Frere, a barrister and parliamentary clerk, by whom she had nine children, one of which, Charlotte Vansittart Frere (1846–1916), married in 1882 artist and writer A. G. Folliott-Stokes of St Ives, author of several important books on Cornwall, and had issue. The latter married Sir John Palmer, 5th Baronet, who was MP for Leicestershire from 1765 to 1780.

== See also ==
- Gough-Calthorpe family

Parliament of Great Britain
Preceded by Exton Sayer; Charles Wills	Member of Parliament for Totnes; 1732–1734; With: Charles Wills	Succeeded by Joseph Danvers; Charles Wills
Preceded by James Hoste; Joseph Danvers	Member of Parliament for Bramber; 1734–1751; With: Harry Gough (senior)	Succeeded by Thomas Archer; Harry Gough (senior)
Baronetage of Great Britain
New creation	Baronet (of Edgbaston); 1774–1798	Succeeded by Henry Gough-Calthorpe
