= James Calthorpe =

James Calthorpe may refer to:

- James Calthorpe of Cockthorpe (c. 1558–1614), Sheriff of Norfolk in 1614
- James Calthorpe of East Barsham (1604–1652), Sheriff of Norfolk in 1643
- Sir James Calthorpe (Roundhead) (died 1658), Sheriff of Suffolk, knighted by the Lord Protector Olive Cromwell
- James Calthorpe (Yeoman of the Removing Wardrobe) (1699–1784), English politician and courtier

== See also ==
- Calthorpe (surname)
