= Saxham =

Saxham may refer to:

- Great Saxham, Suffolk
- Little Saxham, Suffolk
- Saxham and Risby railway station
- Saxham Hall
- The Saxhams
- To Saxham. a poem written by Thomas Carew
