= High Sheriff of Suffolk =

English ceremonial officer

This is a list of Sheriffs and High Sheriffs of Suffolk.

The Sheriff is the oldest secular office under the Crown and is appointed annually (in March) by the Crown. The Sheriff was originally the principal law enforcement officer in the county and presided at the Assizes and other important county meetings. Most of the responsibilities associated with the post have been transferred elsewhere or are now defunct, so that its functions are now largely ceremonial. There was a single Sheriff serving the two counties of Norfolk and Suffolk until 1576.

On 1 April 1974, under the provisions of the Local Government Act 1972, the title of Sheriff of Suffolk was retitled High Sheriff of Suffolk.

== Sheriff ==
=== Pre-17th century ===
- 1066: Norman
- Roger Bigod (1st term)
- Robert Malet
- Roger Bigod (2nd term)
- Before 1576 – See High Sheriff of Norfolk and Suffolk
- 1576: Robert Ashfield, of Stowlangtoft
- 1577: John Heigham of Barrow and Bury St Edmunds
- 1578: Sir William Spring, of Lavenham, Kt.
- 1579: Sir Robert Jermyn, of Rushbrook, Kt.
- 1580: Sir Philip Parker, of Erwarton, Kt.
- 1581: Sir Thomas Barnardiston, of Kedington, Kt.
- 1582: Sir Nicholas Bacon of Redgrave
- 1583: Sir William Drury of Hawstead Place, Kt.
- 1584: Sir Charles Framlingham of Crow's Hall, Debenham
- 1585: John Gurdon of Assington
- 1586: George Colt of Cavendish
- 1587: William Clopton, of Kentwell Hall
- 1588: Francis Jermy, of Brightwell
- 1589: Philip Tilney, of Shelley
- 1590: Sir William Waldegrave, of Smallbridge Hall, Bures, Kt.
- 1591: Thomas Rous, of Henham Hall
- 1592: Nicholas Garneys, of Kenton
- 1593: Sir Lionel Tollemache of Helmingham
- 1594: Robert Ford, of Butley
- 1595: Thomas Crofts, of Saxham
- 1596: Sir William Spring, of Pakenham, Kt.
- 1597: Thomas Eden of Sudbury
- 1598: Sir Anthony Wingfield of Letheringham, Kt.
- 1599: Henry Warner of Mildenhall

=== 17th century ===
- 1600: Anthony Felton, of Playford
- 1601: Edward Bacon of Shrubland Hall
- 1602: Sir Edmund Withipol, of Ipswich
- 1603: Thomas Estotevile, of Dalham
- 1604: Sir Nicholas Bacon, of Redgrave
- 1605: Edmund Bokenham, of Great Thornham
- 1606: Sir Thomas Playters, of Sotterley Hall
- 1607: Anthony Penning, of Ipswich
- 1608: John Wentworth, of Somerleyton
- 1609: Sir Lionel Tollemache, of Helmingham (1st term)
- 1610: Sir Thomas Wingfield, of Letheringham
  Sir George Le Hunt, of Bredfield
- 1611: Thomas Tilney, of Shelley
- 1612: Sir Calthrop Parker of Arwerton
- 1613: Sir Martin Estotevile, of Dalham
- 1614: Sir Robert Brooke, of Yoxford
- 1615: Sir Robert Barker of Trimley
- 1616: Thomas Clench of Holbrooke
- 1617: Sir Lionel Tollemache, 1st Baronet of Helmingham (2nd term)
- 1618: Sir Edward Lewknor of Denham
- 1619: Sir John Wentworth of Somerleyton
- 1620: Sir Henry North, of Wickham Brook
- 1621: Sir William Spring of Pakenham
- 1622: William Whettle, of Ampton
- 1623: Robert Brooke, of Nacton
- 1624: Sir Nathaniel Barnardiston of Kedington
- 1625: Geoffrey Pitman, of Woodbridge
- 1626: Samuel Aylmer, of Claydon (eldest son of John Aylmer)
- 1627: Sir John Prescot, of Hoxne
- 1628: Maurice Barrow, of Barningham
- 1629: Brampton Gurdon of Assington
- 1630: Sir Henry Bokenham of Great Thornham
- 1631: John Acton, of Bramford
- 1632: Sir Robert Crane, 1st Baronet of Chilton
- 1633: Sir William Soame, of Thurlow
- 1634: Sir Edmund Bacon, 2nd Baronet of Redgrave
- 1635: Sir John Barker, 1st Baronet of Trimley
- 1636: Sir John Rous of Henham
- 1637: Sir Philip Parker, of Erwarton
- 1638: Sir Anthony Wingfield, Baronet of Letheringham
  Edward Duke, of Benhall
- 1639: John Clench, of Creeting
- 1640: Sir Symonds D'Ewes, of Stowlangtoft
- 1641: Sir William Spring, 1st Baronet, of Pakenham
- 1642: Sir William Castleton, Bt of Bury
- 1643: Maurice Barrow, of Barningham,
- 1644: John Colton, of Earl Soham
- 1645: Sir Arthur Jenney, of Knodishall
- 1646: Thomas Bloss, of Belstead
- 1647: Thomas Kerridge, of Shelley
- 1648: Robert Wright, of Wangford
- 1649: Sir Wiseman Bokenham, of Thornham
- 1650: Sir William Hervey, of Hengrave
- 1651: Edward Clarke, of East Bergholt
- 1652: Sir Robert Coke of Huntingfield (died 1653)
- 1652: Edward Wennieve, of Brettenham
- 1653: Robert Cordell of Long Melford
- 1654: Sir John Barker, Baronet of Trimley
- 1655: Martin Salter, of Battisford
- 1656: James Calthorpe, of Ampton
- 1657: Thomas Baker, of Fressingfield
- 1658: John Wyard, of Brundish
- 1659: John Wyard, of Brundish
- 1660: Sir John Castleton, 2nd Baronet of Bury
- 1661: Renold Williams, of Stoke
- 1662: Joseph Brand of Edwardstone
- 1663: Francis Theobald, of Barking
- 1664: John Bence, of Ringsfield
- 12 November 1665: Sir Edmund Bacon, 4th Baronet, of Redgrave
- 7 November 1666: Sir Samuel Barnardiston, 1st Baronet, of Brightwell
- 6 November 1667: Sir Edmund Sorrell
- 24 November 1667: Geoffrey Howland, of Covehithe
- 6 November 1668: John Clerke
- 25 November 1668: Samuel Blackaby, of Stowmarket
- 11 November 1669: Sir Robert Dycer, 1st Baronet, of Ipswich
- 4 November 1670: John Clarke, of Bury St Edmunds
- 9 November 1671: John Risby, of Thorp Morieux
- 11 November 1672: William Gibs
- 1672: William Soame
- 12 November 1673: Francis Sherwin
- 17 November 1673: William Sherington, of London
- 5 November 1674: Joseph Warner, of Sudbury
- 1674: Sir William Spring, 2nd Baronet, of Pakenham
- 15 November 1675: Joseph Warner, of Sudbury
- 10 November 1676: John Acton, of Bramford
- 22 November 1676: Robert Greene, of Wilby
- 26 November 1676: George Sterling, of Charsfield
- 6 January 1676/7: William Gibbs, of Stoke
- 17 January 1676/7: Henry Edgar, of Eye
- 15 November 1677: Samuel Kerrudge
- 17 November 1677: Sir Willoughby D'Ewes, 2nd Baronet
- 14 November 1678: Sir John Rous, 2nd Baronet
- 13 November 1679: Sir Robert Brooke, of Yoxford
- 1681: Sir William Davenly of Newton
- 1682: Thomas Waldegrave of Smallbridge replaced by John Scrivener of Tannington
- 1683: Thomas Waldegrave of Smallbridge
- 1684: Jacob Garrett of Creeting St. Mary
- 1685: Sir John Cordell, 2nd Baronet of Melford replaced by Sir Robert Davers
- 1686: Jeoffery Nightingale
- 1687: Sir John Castleton, 3rd Baronet of Bury St Edmunds
- 1688: John Clerke of Bury
- 1689: Edmund Sheppard of Campsey Ash
- 1690: Sir Dudley Cullum, 3rd Baronet of Hardwick House, Hawstead
- 1691: Sir Joseph Brand of Edwardstone
- 1692: George Goodday, of Fornham
- 1693: John Hammond
- 1694: William Cooke, of Linstead
- 1695: Daniel Browning
- 1696: Sir Thomas Spring, 3rd Baronet, of Pakenham
- 1697: John Pack, of Stoke Ash
- 1698: John Cornwallis, of Wingfield
- 1699: Thomas Aldrich, of Hessett

=== 18th century ===
- 1700: Samuel Warner of Parham
- 1701: Henry Cooper of Yoxford
- 1702: John Scrivener of Sibton
- 1703: Sir Richard Allin, 1st Baronet of Somerleyton, Bt.
- 1704: Richard Phillips of Ipswich and Edwardstone
- 1705: Thomas Kerridge of Shelley
- 1706: Leicester Martin of Christchurch, Ipswich
- 1707: Thomas Macro of Bury
- 1708: Richard Norton of Ixworth Abbey
- 1709: John Sheppard of Campsey Ash
- 1710: Stephen Bacon
- 1711: Thomas Bloss, of Burstall
- 1712: Francis Coleman of Hacheston replaced by John Smith of Houlton
- 1713: John Ewer of Chediston replaced by John Moore of Kentwell
- 1714: John Sheppard of Campsey Ash
- 1715: Jonathan Myles
- 1716: Joseph Chaplin of Bergholt
- 1717: John Inwood
- 1718: Edward Clarke of Bergholt
- 1719: Nicholas Jacob
- 1720: Bartholomew Young of Bradfield
- 1721: John Pitt of Great Bealings
- 1722: Sir Jasper Cullum, 4th Baronet of Hardwick House
- 1723: John Boggas of Great Finborough
- 1724: Gregory Coppinger
- 1725: Hustings Wilkinson
- 1726: Thomas Driver of Earl Stonham
- 1727: Robert Goodrich
- 1728: Sir John Playters, 5th Baronet of Sotterley Hall
- 1729: Tobias Bloss of Belstead
- 1730: Sir Thomas Allin, 2nd Baronet of Somerleyton
- 1731: Nathaniel Acton, of Hemingston
- 1732: George Dashwood
- 1733: Alexander Bence, of Thorington
- 1734: John Eldred
- 1735: John Reynolds
- 1736: John Corrance of Rougham
- 1737: Reginald Rabett of Bramfield
- 1737: John Cooper of Shimsfield
- 1738: Sir William Barker, of Ipswich, Bt.
- 1739: William Acton of Bramford Hall
- 1740: Edmund Jenney of Bredfield House
- 1741: Samuel Lucas of Chelmondiston
- 1742: Baron Prettyman of Bacton
- 1743: Sir John Barker, 6th Baronet of Sproughton
- 1744: Robert Leman of Wickham Market
- 1745: Charles Scrivener of Sibton
- 1746: Philips Colman of Ipswich
- 1747: Robert Edgar of Ipswich
- 1748: Lamb Barry, of Syleham
- 1749: Thomas White, of Tattingstone
- 1750: Richard Oneby, of Lowdham
- 1751: George Goodday, of Fornham
- 1752: William Naunton, of Letheringham
- 1753: Robert Sparrow, of Brandiston
- 1754: William Jennens (or William Jennings), of Acton
- 1755: Cooke Freeston, of Mettingham
- 1756: John Canham, of Milden
- 1757: Henry Moore, of Kentwell Hall Melford
- 1758: Robert May, of Sutton
- 1759: Sir John Rous, 5th Baronet of Henham
- 1760: Thomas Thorowgoodof Kersey
- 1761: Thomas Moseley of Ousden
- 1762: Shadrach Brice of Clare
- 1763: Ezekiel Sparke of Walsham-le-Willows
- 1764: Sir John Blois, 5th Baronet of Yoxford
- 1765: George Golding of Thorington
- 1766: Gabriel Trusson of Kelsall
- 1767: William Chapman, of Loudham Hall
- 1768: Osborn Fuller of Carlton
- 1769: Hutchinson Mure of Great Saxham
- 1770: Eleazor Davy of Ubbeston
- 1771: John Freston Scrivener of Sibton
- 1772: Nathaniel Acton of Bramford
- 1773: Thomas Maynard of Wrentham
- 1774: Edmund Tyrell of Gipping
- 1775: Richard Moore of Kentwell Hall
- 1776: John Frere of Bacton
- 1777: Robert Sparrow of Worlingham Hall
- 1778: Reginald Rabett of Bramfield
- 1779: John Sheppard of Campsey Ash
- 1780: Samuel Rush of Benhall
- 1781: Sir Charles Kent, 1st Baronet of Fornham
- 1782: William Middleton of Crowfield
- 1783: Robert Trotman of Ipswich
- 1784: John Wennieve of Brettenham
- 1785: Sir Thomas Gooch, 4th Baronet of Benacre
- 1786: James Sewell of Strutton
- 1787: John Meadows Theobald of Henley
- 1788: Sir Thomas Charles Bunbury, of Barton, Bt.
- 1789: Nathaniel Lee Acton, of Livermere
- 1790: Miles Barne of Sotterley Hall
- 1791: Sir William Rowley, of Stoke
- 1792: Alexander Adair, of Flixton
- 1793: George Doughty, of Leiston
- 1794: Charles Purvis, of Darsham
- 1795: Jacob Whitbread, of Loudham
- 1796: John Clayton, of Sibton
- 1797: Chaloner Arcedeckne of Glemham
- 1798: John Sheppard, of Campsey Ash
- 1799: George Rush, of Benhall

=== 19th century ===
- 5 February 1800: William Beaumaris Rush, of Raydon
- 11 February 1801: Charles Streynsham Collinson, of Sproughton
- 3 February 1802: Thomas Cocksedge, of Bury St Edmunds
- 3 February 1803: Sir Harry Parker, 6th Baronet, of Melford Hall
- 23 April 1804: Sir Robert Pocklington, of Chelsworth
- 6 February 1805: George Nassau, of Trimley St Martin
- 1 February 1806: Michael William le Heup, of Bury St Edmunds
- 4 February 1807: Thomas Mills, of Saxham Hall
- 3 February 1808: John Vernon, of Nacton
- 6 February 1809: John Dresser, of Blyford
- 31 January 1810: Joshua Grigby, of Drinkstone
- 8 February 1811: Roger Pettiward, of Great Finborough
- 24 January 1812: Richard Moore, of Kentwell Hall, Long Melford
- 10 February 1813: Harry Spencer Waddington, of Cavenham
- 4 February 1814: Edward Hollond, of Benhall
- 13 February 1815: Charles Tyrell, of Gipping
- 1816: Sir Charles Blois, 6th Baronet, of Yoxford
- 1817: Sir Robert Harland, 2nd Baronet of Nacton
- 1818: Charles Berners of Woolverstone Hall
- 1819: Andrew Arcedeckne of Glevering Hall, Hacheston
- 1820: George Thomas, of Woodbridge
- 1821: Philip Bennett, of Rougham
- 1822: Ambrose Harbord Steward, of Stoke
- 1823: Henry Usborne, of Branches
- 1824: John Fitzgerald of Bredfield
- 1825: Sir Henry Edward Bunbury, of Barton
- 1826: John Payne Elwes, of Stoke by Clare
- 1827: John Francis Leathes, of Herringfleet
- 1828: Robert Hart Logan, of Kentwell Hall
- 1829: John Ruggles Brice, of Clare
- 1830: John Wilson Sheppard, of Campsey Ash replaced by Sir William Fowle Middleton, 2nd Baronet of Shrubland Hall
- 1831: John Read, of Primrose Hill, Holbrook
- 1832: Joseph Burch Smyth, of Stoke Hall, Ipswich
- 1833: Sir Thomas Gooch, 5th Baronet, of Benacre
- 1834: John Garden, of Redisham
- 1835: Robert Sayer, of Sibton Park
- 1836: Edward Bliss, of Brandon
- 1837: Sir Hyde Parker, 8th Baronet, of Long Melford
- 1838: Thomas Hallifax the elder, of Chadacre Hall
- 1839: Arthur John Brooke, of Horningsheath
- 1840: George St Vincent Wilson, of Redgrave
- 1841: Sir Joshua Ricketts Rowley, of Tendring Hall
- 1842: Edward Bridgman, of Coney Weston
- 1843: William Long, of Saxmundham
- 1844: Sir Philip Broke, 2nd Baronet, of Nacton
- 1845: Henry Wilson, of Stowlangtoft
- 1846: Sir Robert Adair, Bt, of Flixton
- 1847: Henry James Oakes, of Nowton Court
- 1848: Charles Vanneck, 3rd Baron Huntingfield, of Haveningham Hall
- 1849: John Henniker-Major, 4th Baron Henniker, of Thornham Hall, replaced by Thomas James Ireland, of Ousden Hall
- 1850: Sir Thomas Rokewode-Gage, 8th Baronet, of Hengrave Hall
- 1851: Frederick Barne, of Sotterley Hall
- 1852: James Hamilton Lloyd-Anstruther, of Hintlesham Hall
- 1853: John Henniker-Major, 4th Baron Henniker, of Thornham Hall
- 1854: Windsor Parker, of Clopton Hall
- 1855: John Josselyn, of St Edmund's Hill, Bury St Edmunds
- 1856: Andrew Arcedeckne, of Glevering Hall, Hacheston
- 1857: John George Weller Poley, of Boxted Hall
- 1858: Peter Robert Burrell, of Stoke Park, Ipswich
- 1859: John George Sheppard, of Campsey Ash
- 1860: Thomas Thornhill, of Riddlesworth
- 1861: Edward Robert Starkie Bence, of Kentwell Hall, Melford
- 1862: Sir John Blois, 8th Baronet, of Cockfield Hall, Yoxford
- 1863: John William Brooke, of Sibton Park
- 1864: Sir George Broke-Middleton, 3rd Baronet, of Nacton
- 1865: John Page Reade, of Stutton
- 1866: William Gilstrap, of Fornham St. Greneveve
- 1867: Robert John Pettiward, of Great Finborough Hall
- 1868: Sir Charles James Fox Bunbury
- 1869: Frederick William Schreiber, of Melton replaced in February 1869 by Francis Brooke, of Ufford Place.
- 1870: Frederick William Thellusson, Lord Rendlesham, of Rendlesham Hall
- 1871: Thomas Richard Mills, of Great Saxham
- 1872: Henry Alexander Starkie Bence of Thorington Hall
- 1873: Fuller Maitland Wilson of Stowlangtoft Hall
- 1874: Thomas Barbot Beale, of Brettenham Park
- 1875: Sir Robert Affleck, 6th Baronet of Dalham Hall
- 1876: Harry Spencer Waddington, of Cavenham Hall
- 1877: George Holt Wilson, of Redgrave Hall
- 1878: Sir Francis Robert Sherlock Lambert Gooch, of Benacre, 8th Baronet
- 1879: William Beeston Long, of Hurt's Hall, Saxmundham
- 1880: George Henry Pocklington, of Chelsworth
- 1881: Robert Emlyn Lofft, of Troston Hall
- 1882: Edward Phillippe Mackenzie of Downham Hall, Brandon
- 1883: John George Weller-Poley, of Boxted Hall
- 1884: Walter Thomas Brown, of Brent Eleigh
- 1885: Sir Alfred Sherlock Gooch, 9th Baronet of Benacre Hall
- 1886: Herbert Bulkley Praed, Ousden Hall
- 1887: William Edmund Image of Herringswell
- 1888: George Gery Milner-Gibson-Cullum of Hardwick House, Hawstead
- 1889: John Paley (1839-1894) of Ampton Hall
- 1890:
- 1891: Arthur Heywood of Sudbourne Hall
- 1892: Frederick St. John Newdegate Barne of Sotterley Hall, Beccles
- 1893: Ferdinand Eyre of the Mount, Bury St. Edmund's
- 1894: William Naunton Waller of the Grove, Little Bealings
- 1895: Charles Hugh Berners of Woolverstone Park, Ipswich
- 1896: Sir Savile Brinton Crossley of Somerleyton Hall, Bart.
- 1897: Edward Walter Greene of Nether Hall, Pakenham
- 1898: Thomas Henry Tacon of Bed House, Eye
- 1899: Edwin James Johnstone of Rougham Hall

=== 20th century ===
- 1900: Roger Kerrison, of Tattingstone Place
- 1901: John Dupuis Cobbold of Holywell
- 1902: Henry Edmund Buxton, of Fritton, Great Yarmouth
- 1903: Stanhope Alfred Tollemache, of Bentley and Northleigh, Ipswich
- 1904: Lieutenant-Colonel Alfred George Lucas, of Lowestoft
- 1905: Ralph Barrett Macnaghten Blois, 9th Baronet of Cockfield Hall, Yoxford
- 1906: George Arthur Paley (1874-1941), of Ampton Hall, Bury St. Edmunds (son of: JP., 1889)
- 1907: Duncan Parker, of Clopton Hall, Rattlesden, near Bury St. Edmunds
- 1908: Sir Henry Charles John Bunbury, 10th Baronet of The Woodlands, Mildenhall
- 1909: Almeric Paget of Brandon Park
- 1910: Sir Frederick Edward Shafto Adair
- 1911: Sir Thomas Vere Sherlock Gooch
- 1912: Frederick Charles Ulick Vernon-Wentworth, of Black Heath, Friston, Saxmundham
- 1913: Arthur Maitland Wilson of Stowlangtoft, near Bury St. Edmunds
- 1914: William Evelyn Long of Hurts Hall, Saxmundham
- 1915: George Espec John Manners of Fornham Park, Bury St. Edmunds
- 1916: Frederick Archibald Charles, 6th Baron Rendlesham of Rendlesham Hall
- 1917: Glencairn Stuart Ogilvie of Sizewell Hall, near Leiston
- 1918: Charles Pettiward of Finborough Hall
- 1919: Francis Egbert Hollond of Leiston Old Abbey, Leiston
- 1920: Sir Gerald Hemmington Ryan, 1st Baronet, of Hintlesham Hall, Ipswich
- 1921: Captain Robert Leatham Barclay of Higham, Bury St. Edmunds
- 1922: Sir George Agnew, 2nd Baronet of Rougham Hall, Bury St. Edmunds
- 1923: Sir (Alfred) Collingwood Hughes, 10th Baronet of The Lodge, East Bergholt
- 1924: Sir (Henry) Herbert Hambling, of Rookery Park, Yoxford
- 1925: Col. William Geoffrey Carwardine-Probert of Bevills Hall, Bures St. Mary
- 1926: John Soame Austen of Plumpton House, Whepstead, Bury St. Edmunds
- 1927: Sir Pierce Lacy, 1st Baronet of Ampton Hall, Bury St. Edmunds
- 1928: Brigadier-General Samuel Eyre Massy Lloyd of Westwood House, Ipswich
- 1929: Brigadier-General Archibald Fraser Home, of Cavenham Park, Mildenhall
- 1930: Lieut.-Col. Harold Everard Hambro of Coldham Hall, Stanningfield, Bury St. Edmunds
- 1931: Arthur Churchman, 1st Baron Woodbridge
- 1932: Captain James St. Vincent Broke Saumarez of Broke Hall, Nacton, Ipswich
- 1933: Algernon Henry Mackworth Praed, of Ousden Hall, Newmarket
- 1934: John Murray Cobbold of Glemham Hall, Wickham Market
- 1935: Sir Christopher Magnay, 3rd Baronet, of Saxham Hall, Bury St. Edmund's
- 1936: Sir Charles Henry Napier Bunbury, 11th Baronet
- 1937: Edward Lambert Gosling of Herringswell Manor, Mildenhall
- 1938: Stuart Paul of Freston Lodge, Ipswich
- 1939: Lieut.-Col. James William Royce Tomkin, of Little Haugh Hall, Norton, Bury St. Edmunds
- 1940: Francis Lawrence Bland of Rookwood, Copdock, Ipswich
- 1941: Harold Patrick Martin of Nether Hall, Pakenham, Bury St. Edmunds
- 1942: Captain Frank Guy Clavering Fison of Stutton Hall, Ipswich
- 1943: Lieut.-Col. James Archibald Innes of Horringer Manor, Bury St Edmunds
- 1944: Major Durham Simpson Matthews of Lanwades Park, Moulton, Newmarket.
- 1945: Captain Edward Halifax Weller-Poley of Boxted Hall, Bury St. Edmunds.
- 1946: Major Sir John Stuart Agnew, of Rougham, Bury St. Edmunds
- 1947: Colonel Sir Edward Courtenay Thomas Warner, Bt., of The Hall, Brettenham
- 1948: Captain George Marcus Tomline Pretyman of Orwell Park House, Ipswich.
- 1949: Peter Temple Chevallier of Nedging Hall.
- 1950: Sir Robert Gooch, 11th Baronet. of Benacre Hall
- 1951: John Gibson Jarvie, Gedding Hall, Suffolk
- 1952: Thomas Maltby Bland of Rookwood, Copdock, near Ipswich.
- 1953: Lieut-General Sir (Robert) Harold Carrington of Edwardstone House, Boxford
- 1954: Lieut.-Commander Alistair Philip Cobbold, of Belstead Brook, Ipswich
- 1955: Major James Perrott Philipps of Dalham Hall, Newmarket
- 1956: Colonel Brian Sherlock Gooch
- 1957: Harold Charles Drayton of Plumton Hall, Whepstead, Bury St. Edmunds.
- 1958: Lieut-Colonel John Edward Michael Bland of Little Hall, Stutton, near Ipswich.
- 1959: Theodore David Barclay of Desnage Lodge, Higham, Bury St Edmunds
- 1960: David Stanley Pierson of Abbey Oaks, Sproughton, Ipswich
- 1961: Ronald Arthur Vestey of The Hall, Great Thurlow, Haverhill.
- 1962: Alfred Joseph Samson of Northcliffe, Maybush Lane, Felixstowe.
- 1963: John Shuldham Schreiber of Marlesford Hall, Woodbridge
- 1964: Lieut-Colonel Sir George Arthur Falconer of The Old Rectory, Whatfield, near Ipswich.
- 1965: Major John Hallifax Weller-Poley of Boxted Hall, Bury St. Edmunds.
- 1966: Captain Sir Peter McClintock Greenwell, Bt. of Butley Abbey Farm, Woodbridge.
- 1967: Major-General Sir Victor Paley (1903-1976) of The Chestnuts, Great Barton, Bury St. Edmunds (great-nephew of John P.[1889], cousin of George P.[1906]
- 1968: Charles Selwyn Pryor of Great Lodge, Framlingham, Woodbridge
- 1969: Brigadier James Robert Travers Aldous of Hitcham House, Hitcham, Ipswich.
- 1970: Geoffrey Hamilton Paul of Kirton Lodge, Kirton, near Ipswich.
- 1971: Sir Joshua Francis Rowley, of The Cottage, Stoke-by-Nayland.
- 1972: Sir John William Napier Bunbury
- 1973: Alastair Ernest Henderson of Tostock Place, Tostock, Bury St. Edmunds.

== High Sheriff ==
=== 20th century ===
- 1974: Peter Algernon Strutt of Stutton Hall, Stutton, Ipswich.
- 1975: Richard Stephen Ryder of Great Bradley Hall, Newmarket.
- 1976:Charles Brodrick Amyass Bernard of By the Crossways, Kelsale, Saxmundham.
- 1977: David Rutherfurd Dickson of Barrow Lodge, Bury St. Edmunds
- 1978: Lieut-Colonel James Michael Heigham Royce Tomkin of The Red House, Wissett, Halesworth.
- 1979: Air Commodore Sir Peter Beckford Rutgers Vanneck of White Lodge, Waldringfield, Woodbridge
- 1980: Lieut-Colonel Richard Harlackenden Carwardine Probert of Bevills, Bures.
- 1981: Captain Robin John Sheepshanks of The Rookery, Eyke, Woodbridge.
- 1982: Roger Hewitt Paul of Brundish Lodge, Woodbridge
- 1983: Major Walter John Blencowe Bridge of Broom Hall, Bradfield St. George, Bury St Edmunds.
- 1984: Nicholas Longe of Grange Farm, Hasketon, Woodbridge.
- 1985: Captain Christopher Baldwin Hughes Wake-Walker, of East Bergholt Lodge, East Bergholt
- 1986: Henry Francis Arnold Engleheart of The Priory, Stoke-by-Nayland.
- 1987: Hugh Ludlow Philbrick of The Cottage, Great Bealings, Woodbridge.
- 1988: Robin James Upton of Park Farm, Herringswell, Bury St. Edmunds.
- 1989: Rodney John Derek Blois of Cockfield Hall, Yoxford near Saxmundham
- 1990: George William Paul of Wherstead, Ipswich
- 1991: Merelina Mary Phyllis MacRae of Hatchery House, Little Mill Lane, Barrow, Bury St Edmunds
- 1992: William Le Grand Jacob of Brook House, Cumberland Street, Woodbridge
- 1993: Major Carol James Hay Gurney.
- 1994: Brigadier Adam Brampton Douglas Gurdon, of Burgh House, Woodbridge
- 1995: Sir Richard William Hyde Parker, Bt., of Melford Hall, Long Melford.
- 1996: John Kerr of Blaxhall Hall, Little Glemham, Woodbridge
- 1997: Jonathan Martin Paul of Hillside, Freston, Ipswich
- 1998: Patrick Vavasseur Fisher of Kilverstone Hall, Thetford, Norfolk.
- 1999: Colonel David Henry Charles Gordon Lennox, Saxham Hall, Great Saxham, Bury St Edmunds

=== 21st century ===
- 2000: John Clement of Tuddenham Hall, Tuddenham, Ipswich.
- 2001: David William Barclay, Desnage Lodge, Higham Bury St. Edmunds
- 2002: Robert Charles Rous of Dennington Hall, Woodbridge.
- 2003: John Geoffrey Thurlow of The Grange, Elmswell, Bury St Edmunds.
- 2004: Clare FitzRoy, Countess of Euston of Euston Hall
- 2005: Major Philip William Hope-Cobbold, of Glenham Hall, Woodbridge
- 2006: Sir Michael William Bunbury, Bt. of Naunton Hall, Rendlesham, Woodbridge.
- 2007: Air Marshal Sir Richard John Kemball of Tostock, Bury St Edmunds.
- 2008: Diana Ray Hunt of Little Wenham
- 2009: James Kennedy Buckle of Semer
- 2010: Tessa Frances Innes of Playford, Ipswich
- 2011: Stephen Philip Miles of Bury St Edmunds
- 2012: Andrew Francis Norman-Butler of Stoke by Nayland
- 2013: Sir Edward Bernard Greenwell of Woodbridge
- 2014: Nicholas John Wingfield Digby of Higham, Newmarket
- 2015: Judith Veronica Shallow of Felsham Hall, Felsham, Bury St Edmunds
- 2016: William Bruce Kendall of Kelsale, Saxmundham
- 2017: Geoffrey Thomas Carwardine Probert of Bures
- 2018: George Moubray William Vestey of Great Thurlow Hall, Haverhill
- 2019: Rosalind Thrale Eminson of Levington, Ipswich
- 2020: Bridget Fiona McIntyre of Thorndon, Eye
- 2021: Edward George Creasey of Burgh, Woodbridge
- 2022: Major Anthony James Moxon Lowther-Pinkerton of Sutton, Woodbridge
- 2023: John Mark Pendlington of Belchamp St Paul, Sudbury
- 2024: Yvonne Gilchrist-Mason, of Eye
- 2025: Gulshanbir Kaur Kayembe, of Felixstowe
- 2026: Oliver William Paul, Ipswich

== See also ==
High Sheriff of Norfolk and Suffolk
