= Dorothy Calthorpe =

17th-century English writer and philanthropist

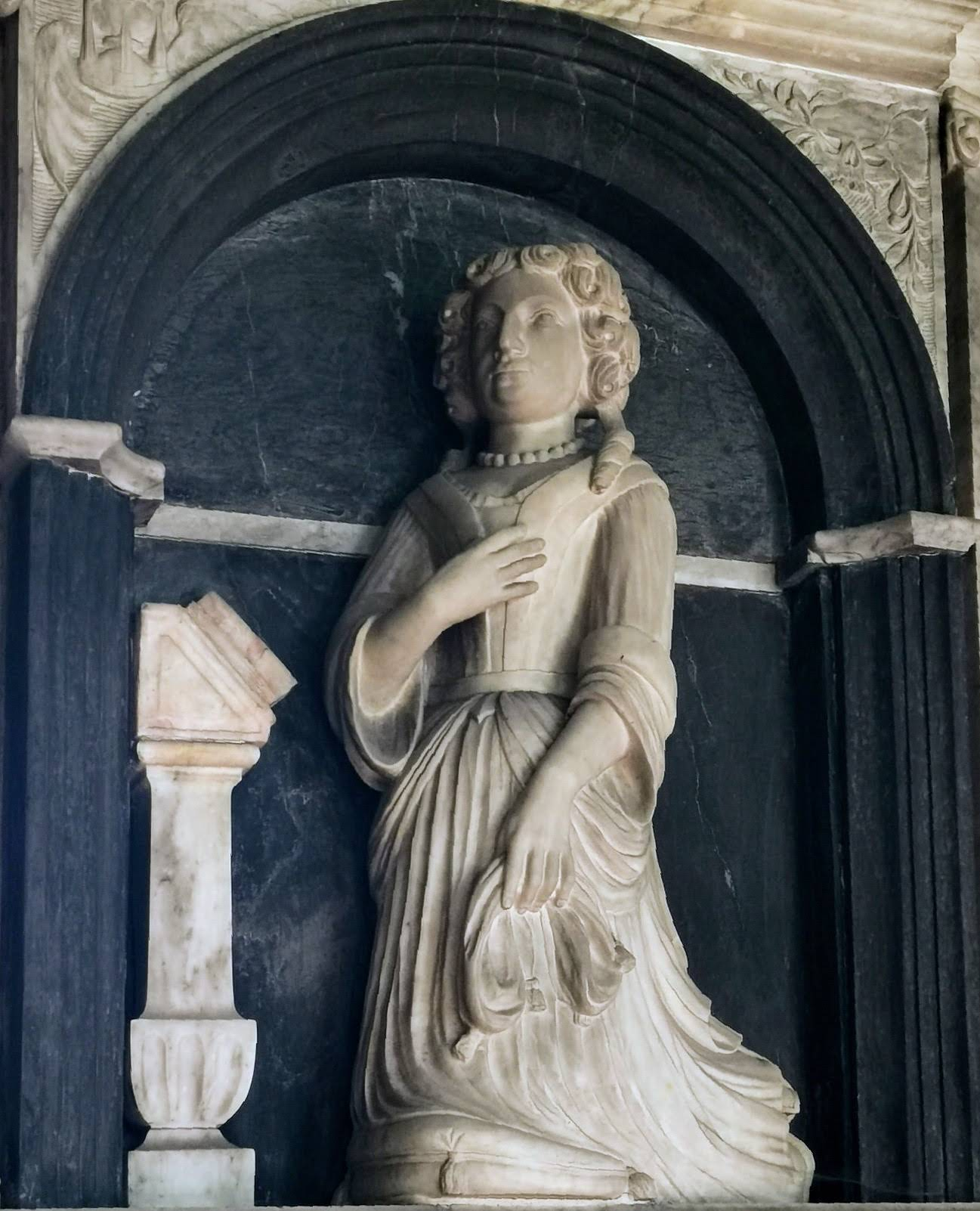
- Dorothy Calthorpe as depicted on the monument to her in Ampton Church
- Born: 28 December 1648; Ampton
- Died: 8 November 1693 (aged 44); Ampton
- Relatives: James Calthorpe (father), Reynolds Calthorpe (brother), Henry Calthorpe (grandfather); Algernon May (stepfather)
- Writing career
- Notable works: "A Castell in the aire, or the pallace of the man in the moone" and "Discription of the Garden of Edden"

Dorothy Calthorpe (1648–1693) was a philanthropist and a writer of poetry known for an autograph manuscript volume containing poems, a prose romance, and two devotional prose narratives.

== Early life and family ==
Calthorpe was born in Ampton, Suffolk on 28 December 1648 to James Calthorpe and Dorothy Reynolds. Her father James was a roundhead serving as High Sheriff of Suffolk, in 1656, during the Protectorate of Oliver Cromwell, by whom he was knighted at Whitehall, 10 December, in the same year. She lived her entire life in the village and remained unmarried.

== Writings ==
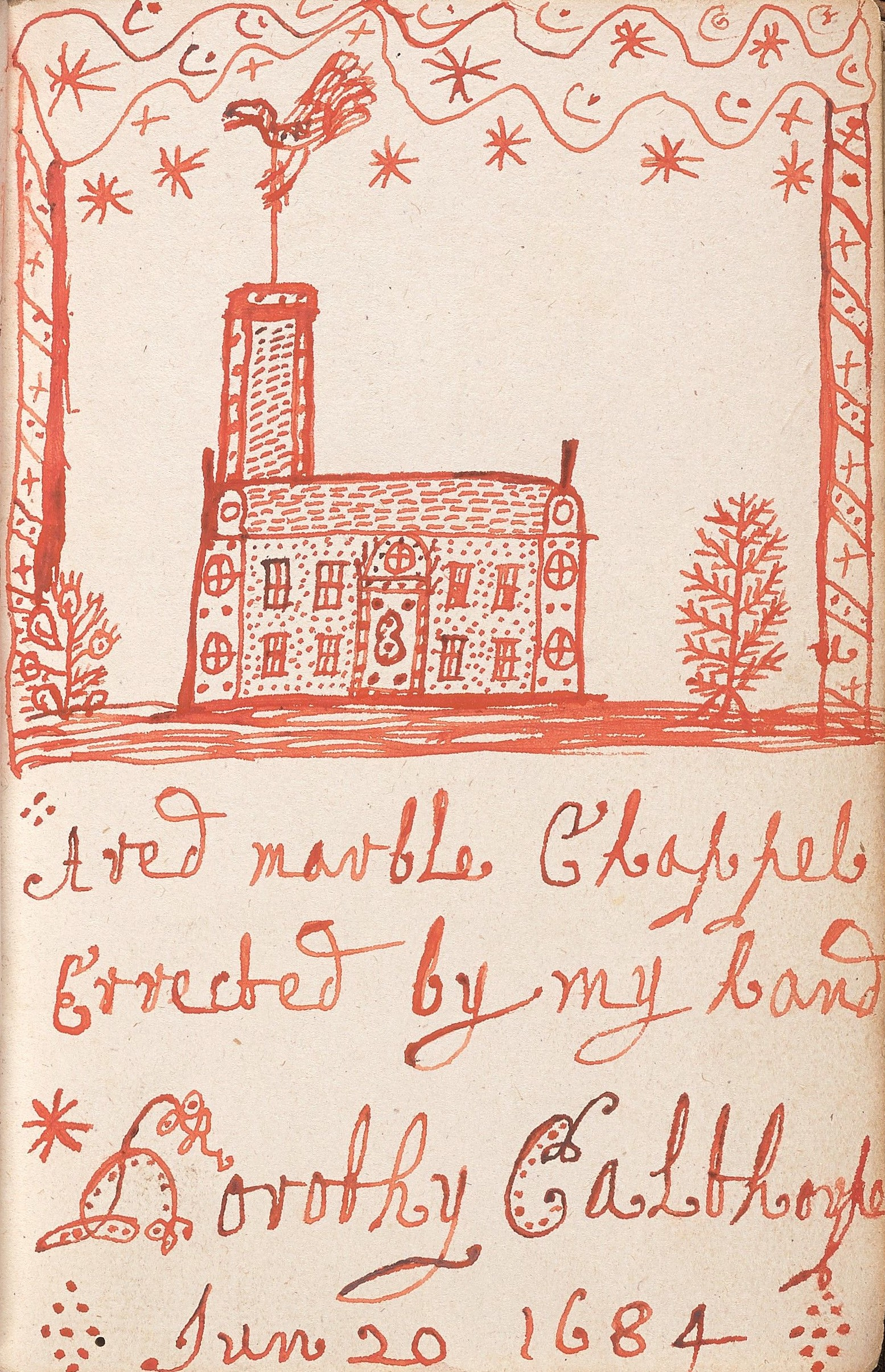
Title page of Dorothy Calthorpe's book

Calthorpe authored a volume containing a variety of texts, including a prose romance about her family, three poems, and two prose narratives with spiritual and political themes: "A Castell in the Aire or the Pallace of the Man in the Moon" and "A Discription of the Garden of Edden." Notations within the volume indicate that it was begun in 1672-73 and completed in 1684, which locates its composition within the immediate context of the Exclusion Crisis with evidence from the manuscript pointing to suggest that Calthorpe herself had royalist leanings. Despite the variety, clear themes link the various texts, particularly a concern for ethical Christian behaviour and stewardship including financial, familial, and romantic matters which is reflected in her charitable actions through her will.

The volume has the following parts:

- "Philismena to Philander", 40 lines of verse, in rhymed couplets, beginning "tis not Philander that I disallow".
- "Philander to Philismena", 62 lines of verse, in rhymed couplets, beginning "oh glorious conquest infenetly aboue".
- "In commendations of a country Life it being so innocent", 32 lines of verse, in rhymed couplet beginning "oh how I hate the tumults of a Citty".
- "A Discription of the Garden of Edden", an imaginative prose account.
- "A Short History of the Life and Death of Sr Ceasor Dappefer / or els a pleasent histtory of Jewlious: and Dorinda the truth of it was so Lately represented that some of those worthy persons are still liueing and ownes what: is here repated", aprose narrative, dated at the end 1677, followed by three pages of explanation about the "designe of this Littell Memoise", which was "to giue a true relation of my owne famely" under assumed names.
- "A Castell in the aire or the pallace of the man in the moon", a prose, a religious meditation in the first person, apparently lacking ending on one of two excised leaves.
- "Philismena to Philander" and half of "Philander to Philismena" again, written from the reverse end and heavily deleted with a series of swirling loops.

The title page also contains a drawing of a chapel in red ink and the following inscription: "A red marble Chappel Errected by my hand Dorothy Calthorpe Jun 20 1684". Making her book not only a personal space in which to record her own narratives and poems but also a chapel in which she displayed her spiritual devotion through writing.

=== Auction ===
The autograph manuscript volume was discovered by scholars when it was sold at a Sotheby's auction in 2006 as part of a sale of property from an estate at Shrubland Park, Coddenham. The manuscript was purchased by the Beinecke Rare Book & Manuscript Library at Yale University funded by the James Marshall and Marie-Louise Osborn Fund, where it now resides.

=== A Castell in the aire or the pallace of the man in the moon ===
In this work the speaker adopts a "pillgrims habitt" and borrows "Iacobs Ladder" in order to "climbe the skie and trauers the territoryes of the princes of the aire”, which is written in the style of a travel tale or fantasy journey. Initially, the narrators' journey appears to be of a secular and classical nature. She comes first “to the prouince of the man in the moon” and proceeds next to “carrons [ Charon ’s] boate", which transports her to a mountainside covered in snow. In fact, the entire work freely incorporates classical source material, a much of it from Greek and Roman mythology mixed with heavenly Christian images. Thus, the speaker eventually makes it to the "gilded gates" which she uses to reach "the Land of Promes," where she is welcomed by "a handsome youth" who offers to be her guide. The celestial realm in "A Castell in the aire" bears a strong resemblance to Renaissance aristocratic aesthetic standards, just like the garden in Calthorpe's earlier story. The huge rooms that the handsome man leads her through are "Lofty," covered "with azure and spangled with diments," and "the walles and floores [are] golde."

However, the story soon has a strongly Christian tone. She is corrected by her guide, who compares her to Lucifer, who was expelled from heaven for his arrogance, when the speaker looks down from heaven at "all the kingdomes of the Earth" and declares a wish to "take up [her] rest" in heaven rather than go back "to that Low place" below. Instead, the speaker is instructed to "humbly and patiently waite till your appointed time and by good workes merite that Elizum where all thinges are new and flourishing." This is one of many spiritual teachings that the speaker received throughout her journey, most of which promoted humility and forbearance. "A Castell in the Aire" belongs to a long tradition of fantastic voyage accounts in ancient and mediaeval literature, including works by Sir John Mandeville and Lucian's True History. These tales remained popular in England in the sixteenth and seventeenth centuries as authors like Thomas More reworked traditional travel narratives to fit their country's modern political, economic, and religious environment. A number of works describing lunar travel were published in the 1630s, including Francis Godwin's "The Discovery of a World in the Moone (1638)" and John Wilkins' "The Man in the Moone (1638)". Both of these pieces were influenced by the heliocentric ideas of the Copernican revolution as well as the geographic findings of the Columbus era.

== Death and bequests ==
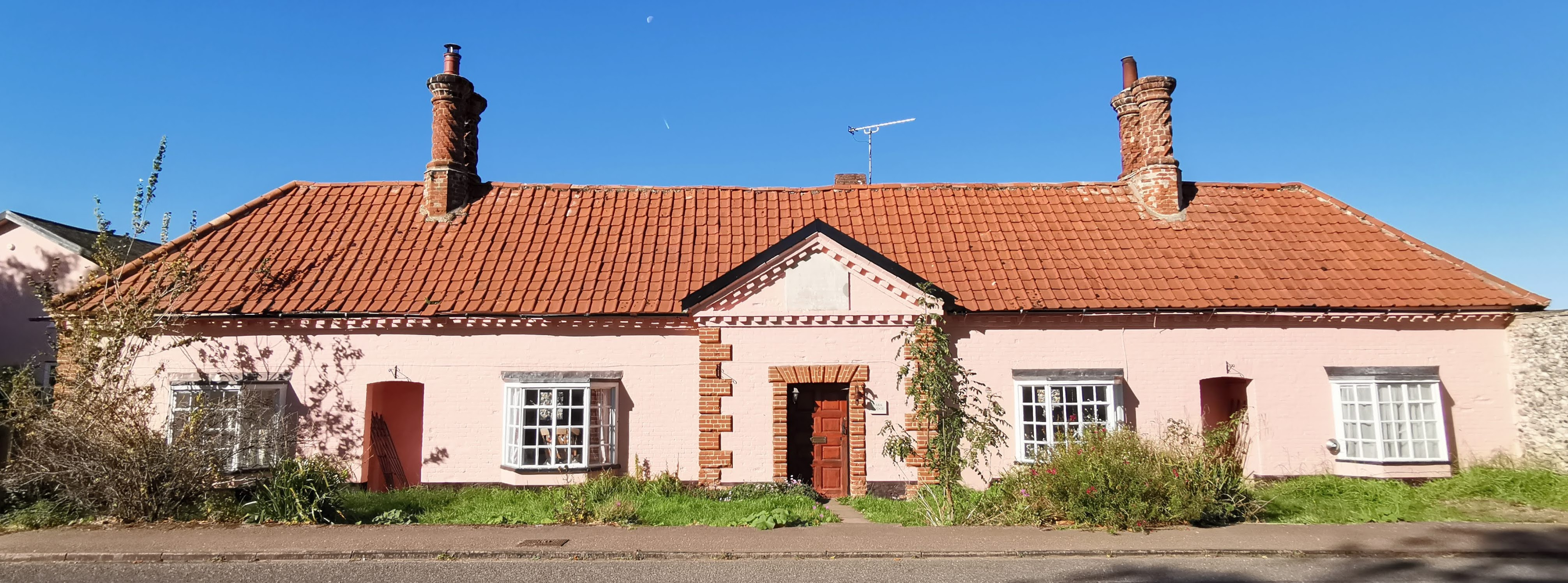
The Almshouses in Ampton funded by Dorothy Calthorpe's bequest

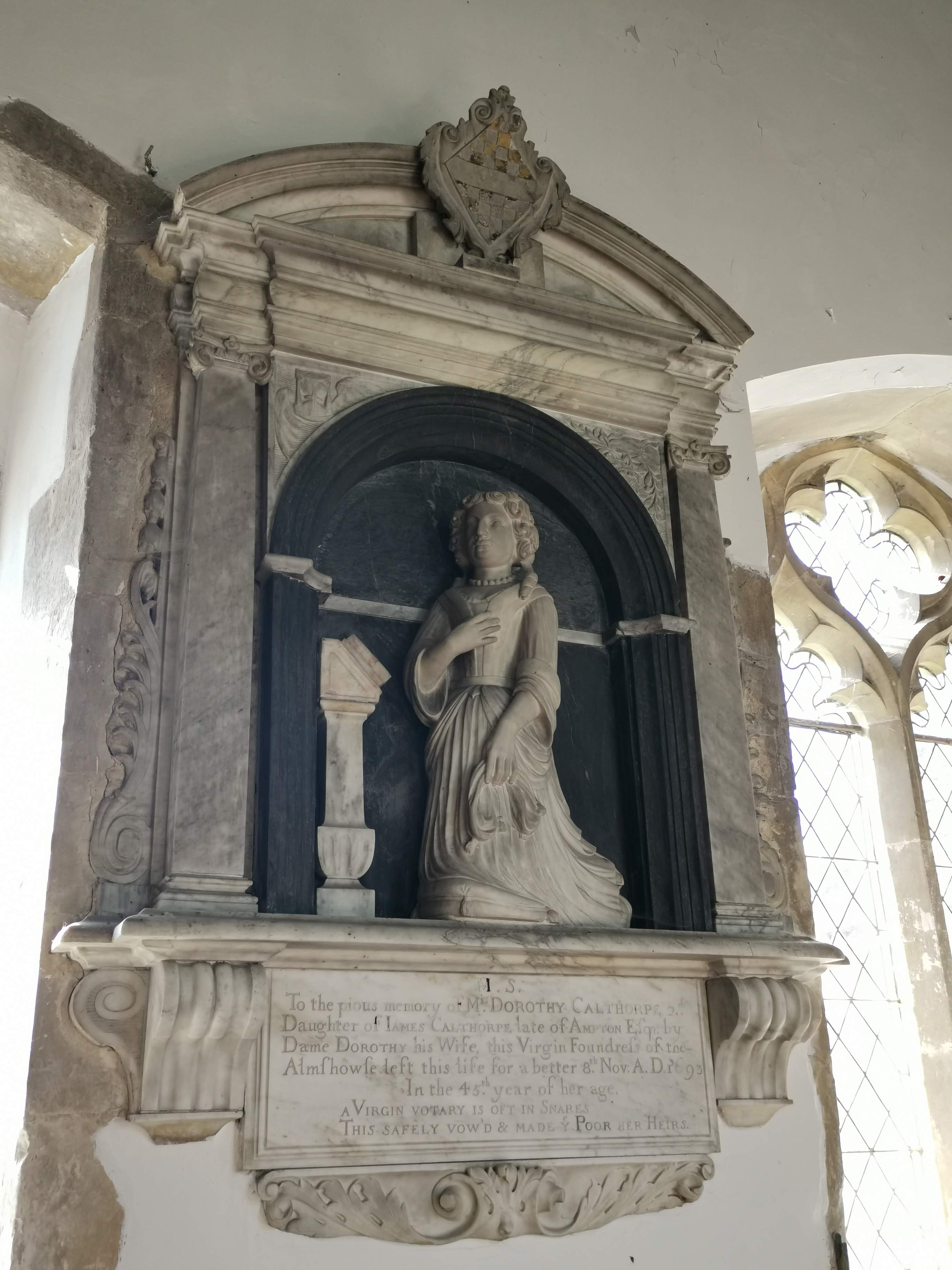
Monument to Dorothy Calthorpe in Ampton Church

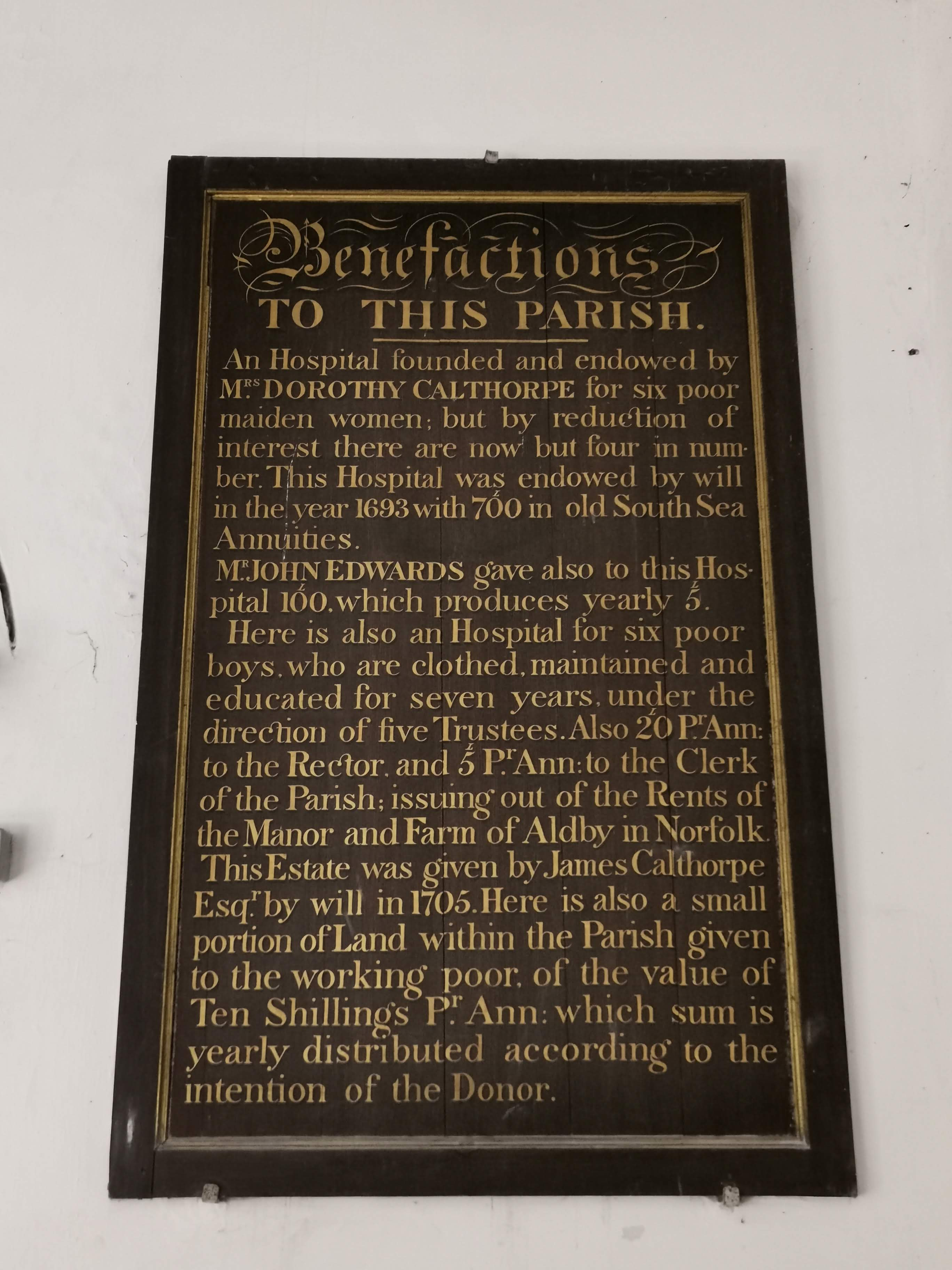
Benefactors plaque in Ampton Church detailing her legacy

Dorothy died on 8 November 1693 and in her will dated 18 May 1693 left a number of bequests to the local poor. She left £1,000 to the perpetual endowment of almshouses in Ampton for the use of six old widows or maids and a further £100 to be used to construct the houses. The bequest was insufficient and only four almshouses were constructed being completed in 1695.

£500 was given to the local town of Bury St Edmunds to apprentice poor boys in handicrafts with the trustees being two clergymen. Some of the money was used to purchase a house in Chequer Square and three cottages in Bridewell Lane in the town. In 1891 the bequest generated £73 12s 11d. Equivalent to around £7,250 in August 2022.

A number of books owned by Calthorpe were bequeathed in her will to both specific relatives and the future inhabitants of the alms-houses.

A marble monument is mounted on the south wall of St Peter's Church Ampton depicting her kneeling by a bookstand with allegorical carvings including a skull and an hourglass.

To the pious memory of Mis Dorothy Calthorpe 2.d Daughter of Iames Calthorpe later of Ampton Eſqß: by Dame Dorothy his Wife, this Virgin Foundreſs of the Almſhowſe left this life for a better 8th Nov: A.D. 1693 In the 45th year of her age. A Virgin votary is oft in Snares This safely vow'd & made ye Poor her Heirs

— Inscription on Calthorpe's memorial

Today the almshouses form a private residence in Ampton known as Park lodge. It is a single storey building of colour-washed brick, with chamfered and rusticated red brick quoins and dressings, and a slightly projecting central bay with triangular pediment and brick dentil cornice. Black glazed pantiles and two internal chimney-stacks each with two round shafts of ornate moulded brick make up the roof. Four late C19 canted bay windows in earlier openings, with C20 small-paned casements. Central entrance door with eight raised fielded panels, and subordinate doors in recessed porches. The range appears to have been considerably restored in the mid C19, when the present roof, the chimney-stacks and dentil cornice were added to the older structure. The Latin inscription, now very faint, reads: 'MDCXCIII DOROTHEA CALTHORPE HOSPITIUM HOC FUNDIT VIRGO IN VIRGINIUM SOLAMEN.'
