= Calthorpe (surname) =

Calthorpe is a surname. Notable people with the surname include:

- Anne Calthorpe (died c.1579), Countess of Sussex
- Sir Charles Calthorpe (c. 1540–1616), English-born judge in Elizabethan and early Jacobean Ireland
- David Calthorpe (born 1973), former Australian rules footballer
- Freddie Calthorpe (1892–1935), English cricketer
- James Calthorpe of Cockthorpe (c. 1558–1615), Sheriff of Norfolk in 1614
- James Calthorpe (Yeoman of the Removing Wardrobe) (1699–1784), English politician and courtier
- Sir Henry Calthorpe (1586–1637), English lawyer
- Sir Henry Calthorpe (died 1788) of Elvetham in Hampshire, a Knight of the Bath and a Member of Parliament for Hindon
- Isabella Calthorpe, stage name of Isabella Anstruther-Gough-Calthorpe (born 1980), English actress and model
- Sir James Calthorpe of East Barsham (1604–1652), Sheriff of Norfolk in 1643
- Sir James Calthorpe (Roundhead) (died 1658), Sheriff of Suffolk, knighted by the Lord Protector Oliver Cromwell
- Mena Calthorpe (1905–1996), Australian writer
- Peter Calthorpe (born 1949)], architect and urban designer and planner
- Reynolds Calthorpe (1655–1719) of Elvetham in Hampshire, Member of Parliament for Hindon
- Reynolds Calthorpe, the younger (1689–1714), Member of Parliament for Hindon
- William Calthorpe (1410–1498), English aristocrat and Knight of the Bath
- Gough-Calthorpe family associated with the British title Baron Calthorpe:
  - Henry Gough-Calthorpe, 1st Baron Calthorpe (1749–1798), 2nd Baronet
  - Frederick Henry William Gough-Calthorpe, 5th Baron Calthorpe (1826–1893)
  - Augustus Gough-Calthorpe, 6th Baron Calthorpe (1829–1910)
  - Somerset Gough-Calthorpe, 7th Baron Calthorpe (1831–1912)
  - Somerset Gough-Calthorpe (1864–1937), English admiral of the fleet
  - Freddie Calthorpe (1892–1935), English cricketer
