= A. G. V. Paley =

British Army officer (1903–1976)

Major-General Sir A. G. V. Paley KBE CB DSO DL
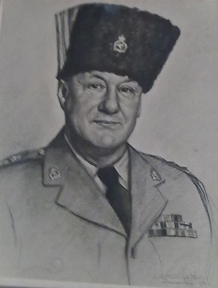
- Born: 1903
- Died: 1976 (aged 72–73)
- Military career
- Allegiance: United Kingdom; Dominion of Ghana
- Branch: British Army; Ghana Army
- Rank: Major-General
- Commands: 22nd Armoured Brigade; 47th Brigade; Chief of the Defence Staff, Ghana
- Conflicts: World War II

Major-General Sir Alexander George Victor Paley, KBE, CB, DSO, DL (1903–1976) was a British Army officer. In addition, he was seconded to the Ghana Army, to become the first Chief of the Defence Staff of the dominion of Ghana.

== Early life ==
Alexander George Victor Paley, generally known as Victor, was born in 1903, the son of George and Rose Paley. George Paley (1872-1914) was an Army officer and was killed in action in October 1914, when Victor was eleven years old. Maj. George Paley of 1st Bn., Rifle Bde. was a staff-officer with 1 Division, in conference with counterparts in 2 Division, at the headquarters in Hooge, when the chateau was shelled, killing several.

Victor was born in Freckenham in Suffolk, where his family was well-established. Victor's grandfather was William Victor Paley (1840-1925), a local artist, but William's brother, John (1839-1894), was the squire of Ampton Hall and married the Hon. Clara Strutt, a daughter of the 2nd Lord Rayleigh. Victor's great-grandfather served as Rector, from 1835 to 1879.

== Career ==
=== War Service ===
Paley served as commanding officer of the 3rd Battalion, Libyan Arab Force between 1941 and 1942. He subsequently served in Iraq and Germany between 1942 and 1954. He also served as aide-de-camp to the Queen.

At the time of the Normandy landings in June 1944, Paley was the commanding officer of 1st Battalion, the Rifle Brigade. The unit was the motorised infantry battalion of 22nd Armoured Brigade, part of 7th Armoured Division. They were heavily engaged in the battle of Villers-Bocage, losing almost an entire company, mostly captured.

In October 1944, during the Second World War, Paley served as the commanding officer of the 22nd Armoured Brigade, while only holding the rank of lieutenant colonel.

In 1945, Lt.Col. Paley was decorated with the DSO for his command during the campaign in North-West Europe.

At the end of the war, he was chosen as one of the military members of the British delegation to the Allied Control Authority, as a temporary rank of brigadier. Having skipped a wartime rank, he received a substantive promotion on his peacetime rank to bring him to full Colonel and transfer to the General Staff in 1947.

=== Postwar ===
As a temporary Brigadier, Paley was appointed a CBE in 1951, upgrading him in status within the order: from an Officer to an ordinary Commander; this also marked a subtle swap in status in his post-nominals, as a Commander trumped the Companionship (the only grade of this order) of the DSO. The following year saw his substantive promotion to Brigadier. He was then appointed an Aide-de-Camp to the Queen, a post he held until 1957 and his substantive promotion.

== Ghana Armed Forces ==
Paley served as the General Officer Commanding Ghana Armed Forces between 1957 and 1959, when his appointment covered only the army. He effectively became the Chief of Defence Staff when the Ghana Navy and Ghana Air Force were created. General Paley's secondment to the Dominion of Ghana ended on 11 January 1960, and he was succeeded by Major General Henry Alexander, DSO, OBE.

On his return home, Sir Victor retired from the British Army and his Reserve liability for recall in the event of an emergency ended in 1963. However, he continued to maintain semi-formal links with the military until the end of the decade.

== Later life ==
In retirement, Sir Victor returned to the county of his birth, Suffolk, and set up home in the village of Great Barton, near to Ampton, where his father's cousin had once owned Ampton Hall, and where he, likewise, put himself forward for public office. In 1967, he was appointed the annual High Sheriff of Suffolk, the third generation of his family to hold the office. The following year he was appointed a Deputy Lieutenant (DL) for the county.

In addition to the civil offices, General Paley held the military appointments typical of a retired senior military officer: Sir Victor served as the Honorary Colonel of the 5th Bn., the Royal Green Jackets (RGJ), a Territorial battalion. The RGJ was the amalgamation of the green-jacketed regiments of the Rifles tradition, with some others, which included his own old regiment. He retired from these duties in 1969.

== Family ==
Paley's immediate family was well-established in Suffolk, in Ampton and in Freckenham, but the main branch was firmly rooted in the North Riding of Yorkshire, in the neighbouring villages of Giggleswick and Langcliffe. Thomas Paley (1540-1592) is the earliest member of the family mentioned in the parish records, beginning at least eight generations of continuous succession in the parish, until the 19th century, when the Industrial Revolution and the railways extended both the horizons and the opportunities. Sir Victor is related the well-known theologian William Paley, sometime Archdeacon of Carlisle, through the clergyman's uncle George (1708-1765). George's son Richard (1746-1808) moved to the growing industrial towns of the North and played a role in the development of Leeds and of Bradford, together with his son and nephew. Richard grew wealthy producing munitions for the French Revolutionary Wars but was bankrupted by the slump following the Peace of Amiens, and died before he could recover. However, the nephew, John Paling Green (1774-1860), took over the Bowling Iron Works and became a wealthy industrialist and railways director. He and his firms financed churches for his birth-place, Langcliffe and of East Bowling, the source of the family wealth. It was probably this investment portfolio that also founded and funded the professional progress of his grandsons, and their descendants.

Military offices
New title	Chief of the Defence Staff; 1958–1960	Succeeded by Major General Henry T. Alexander
