= Calthorpe =

Calthorpe may refer to:

== People ==
- Calthorpe (surname)

== Places ==
- Calthorpe Broad, Norfolk, England
- Calthorpe, Norfolk, England
- Calthorpe, Oxfordshire, England

== Other uses ==
- Calthorpe (novel), an 1821 novel by Thomas Gaspey
- Calthorpe cars, made in England up to 1928
- Baron Calthorpe, extinct title in the Peerage of England
- Calthorpe Clinic, abortion clinic in England
- Calthorpe F.C., defunct football club from Birmingham, England

== See also ==
- Gough-Calthorpe family
- Calthrop, a surname
