= Dycer =

Dycer may refer to:

- List of aircraft (D)#Dycer
- Dycer baronets
