= Lacy baronets =

Title in the Baronetage of the United Kingdom

Arms of Lacy baronets: Gyronny or and gules, on a bend sable a Lacy knot between two martlets of the first

The Lacy Baronetcy, of Ampton in the County of Suffolk, is a title in the Baronetage of the United Kingdom. It was created 23 June 1921 (as part of the 1921 Birthday Honours) for Pierce Lacy, Chairman of the Birmingham Stock Exchange and founder of the British Trusts Association and the British Shareholders Trust.

The first baronet was born in Birmingham but his father John Pierce Lacy, was born in Enniscorthy, County Wexford and moved to Edgbaston, Warwickshire. The first baronet married Ethel Maud Draper, daughter of artist James Finucane Draper of Saint Helier, Jersey. Since 1998, the baronetcy has been held by Sir Patrick Brian Finucane Lacy, 4th Baronet, who inherited the title after his elder brother, the third baronet, died without children.

== Lacy baronets, of Ampton (1921) ==
- Sir Pierce Thomas Lacy, 1st Baronet (16 February 1872 – 25 December 1956)
- Sir Maurice John Pierce Lacy, 2nd Baronet (2 April 1900 – 22 April 1965)
- Sir Hugh Maurice Pierce Lacy, 3rd Baronet (3 September 1943 – 4 December 1998)
- Sir Patrick Brian Finucane Lacy, 4th Baronet (born 14 April 1948)

The heir to the baronetcy is the current baronet's only son, Finian James Pierce Lacy (born 24 September 1972). There are no further heirs to the title.
