= Cumberland Lodge =

Country house in Southern England

Coordinates: 51.4339°N 0.6079°W

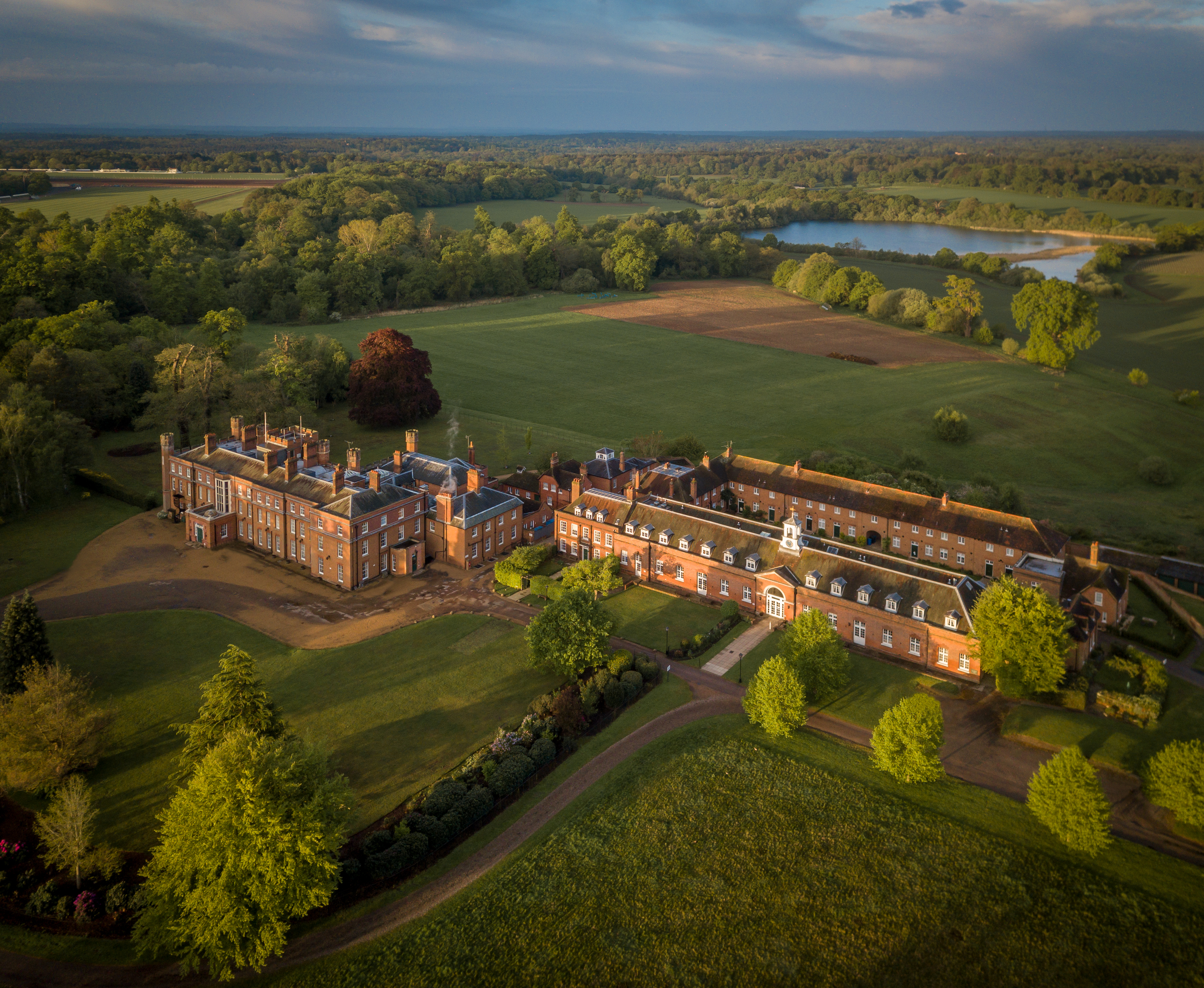
- The Cumberland Lodge building in Windsor Great Park
- Interactive map of the Cumberland Lodge area
- Former names: Byfield House

General information
- Current tenants: Cumberland Lodge
- Year built: 1650
- Client: John Byfield
- Owner: Crown Estate

Listed Building – Grade II
- Official name: Cumberland Lodge
- Designated: 3 March 1972
- Reference no.: 1323664

National Register of Historic Parks and Gardens
- Official name: The Royal Estate, Windsor: Cumberland Lodge
- Designated: 30 September 1987
- Reference no.: 1001436

Cumberland Lodge is a 17th-century Grade II listed country house in Windsor Great Park 3.5 miles (5.6 km) south of Windsor Castle. Since 1947 it has been occupied by the charitable foundation known as Cumberland Lodge, an educational charity and social enterprise that exists to empower young people to lead the conversation around social division. Cumberland Lodge has views of Virginia Water lake and its gardens are Grade I listed on the Register of Historic Parks and Gardens.

== History of the building ==
The house was built by John Byfield, an army captain, in 1650 when Oliver Cromwell divided up and sold off lots in Windsor Great Park. The house was called Byfield House until 1670. After the Restoration, King Charles II made the house the official residence of the Ranger of the Great Park – a Crown appointment always held by someone close to the Sovereign. It was then renamed New Lodge, and at times was also known as Ranger Lodge, Windsor Lodge or The Great Lodge at Windsor by which time its resident was Prince William, Duke of Cumberland, son of King George II (1746–1765). During this period, the building was adapted and altered for the Duke and his retinue by the architect Henry Flitcroft whose assistant Thomas Sandby designed Holly Grove which was only a mile away from Windsor (Cumberland) Lodge. Although the tradition of Deputy Rangers of Windsor Great Park residing at Holly Grove would soon emerge, an army officer – Captain John Deacon – was living there by 1772 when the entire extent of 'Holly Grove House' was 45 acres (18 ha) within a "very beautiful part of the forest". Flitcroft's designs for an improved "Elevation of the Garden Front of Windsor Great Lodge" are part of the Royal Collection Trust. Among those who have lived at the Lodge were:

- Baptist May, the first resident Ranger;
- Sarah Churchill, Duchess of Marlborough (1702–1744); John Churchill, 1st Duke of Marlborough who died there in 1722;
- John Spencer (1744–1746);
- Prince William, Duke of Cumberland, son of King George II (1746–1765);
- Prince Henry, Duke of Cumberland and Strathearn, son of Frederick, Prince of Wales (1765–1790);
- Anne, Duchess of Cumberland and Strathearn, widow of Henry (1790–1803);
- George Spencer-Churchill, 5th Duke of Marlborough (until 1822);
- Augustus Frederick, Duke of Sussex, son of King George III (1830–1843);
- General William Wemyss of Wemyss, Scottish soldier in the British Army and member of parliament died at the lodge in 1852;
- Princess Helena, daughter of Queen Victoria and wife of Prince Christian of Schleswig-Holstein (after their marriage in 1866);
- Lord Fitzalan of Derwent, last Viceroy of Ireland (1923–1947).

During 1936 Cumberland Lodge was used for meetings between Alexander Hardinge (the King's Private Secretary) and Stanley Baldwin (the Prime Minister), which eventually led to the abdication of Edward VIII.

== History of the foundation ==
In 1947 King George VI granted Cumberland Lodge to a new educational foundation, with Amy Buller as its Warden and Sir Walter Moberly as its Principal (1949–55). Buller had recently published her groundbreaking book, Darkness over Germany (1943), about the rise of Nazi sentiments among students and academics in Germany in the late 1930s.

The book impressed leading figures in a nation that was still at war, including Queen Elizabeth (later the Queen Mother), who invited Buller to Buckingham Palace in 1944 to discuss the lessons that could be learnt, to avoid a repeat of 1930s Germany. This led to a determination to set up a place where students, and those responsible for the guidance of young people, could meet to discuss the contributions that they could make, through their studies and future lives, to build a better society and secure a lasting peace. Amy Buller conceived of the idea of a residential centre where students could come with their teachers and, in a relaxed atmosphere, to consider important ethical and social issues outside the normal confines of their degree courses. This was established at the Lodge three years later.

The Queen became patron of the new organisation, which was originally called the St Catharine's Foundation and later (in 1968) became The King George VI and Queen Elizabeth Foundation of St Catharine. That remains the official name of the foundation to this day. In June 2005 a new incorporated charity, called simply Cumberland Lodge, assumed the operating role and assets of the foundation. However, the original charity continues to exist as the holder of the warrant for the property.

Following the death of the Queen Mother in 2002, Queen Elizabeth II became patron of the charity in 2003 and remained in the role until her death in 2022. In May 2024, King Charles III was announced as the new patron of Cumberland Lodge.

== Cumberland Lodge today ==
Key themes of work include the Rule of Law, Youth & Democracy, Freedom of Religion and Belief, and Exploring Ethics, as well as two annual student conferences: Life Beyond the PhD, and the International Student Christmas Conference.

The building is not open to the general public for viewing; however, there are open days, conferences and dining events throughout the year.

Various interior and exterior shots of Lodge can be seen in the 2010 film The King's Speech.

== Governance ==
The Cumberland Lodge charity is overseen by a board of trustees (as of November 2024):

- John Lotherington – chair
- David Matthews – treasurer
- Professor Tom Crick
- Jane Furniss
- Abby Guthkelch
- Stephen Harvey
- Eugene J. Huang
- David Isaac
- Dr Patrina Law
- JP Rangaswami
- Ingrid Tennessee

The previous chair was Usha Prashar, Baroness Prashar.

== Notes ==
Letter from Queen Elizabeth to Queen Mary, 13 November 1944, published in Counting One's Blessings, The Selected Letters of Queen Elizabeth The Queen Mother, William Shawcross (ed.), Macmillan, 2012, pp. 374–375.
