= Algernon May =

English Member of Parliament (died 1704)

Sir Algernon May (died 25 July 1704) was an English member of Parliament, for the constituency of Windsor, in the late 17th century.

He was the fifth son of Sir Humphrey May of Carrow Priory in Norfolk, Chancellor of the Duchy of Lancaster, 1618–1630. A fortunate marriage in 1662 to Dorothy Reynolds, the widow of a Cromwellian soldier, James Calthorpe, brought him the Suffolk manor of Ampton, as well as lands in Ireland.

He was Equerry to Catherine of Braganza from 1662 to 1668, and Keeper of the Records in the Tower of London from 1669 to 1686.

May stood for Windsor, where his younger half-brother, Baptist May, was Ranger of Windsor Great Park, at the general election of 1689. On his petition the election of Sir Christopher Wren was declared void, and he was returned on the corporation franchise at a contested by-election.

He lived for a while in east Greenwich, and it is thought that the thoroughfare Maze Hill (once May's Hill) was named after him.

Parliament of England
Preceded by William Chiffinch; Richard Graham	Member of Parliament for Windsor; 1689–1690; With: Sir Christopher Wren 1689; Henry Powle 1689–1690; Baptist May 1690	Succeeded by Sir Charles Porter; William Adderley
