= John Sheppard (cricketer) =

English cricketer

Personal information
- Full name: John George Sheppard
- Born: 30 January 1824; Woodbridge, Suffolk, England
- Died: 28 May 1882 (aged 58); London, England
- Batting: Unknown

Domestic team information
- Years: Team
- 1845: Marylebone Cricket Club

Career statistics
Competition	First-class
Matches	3
Runs scored	20
Batting average	4.00
100s/50s	–/–
Top score	12
Catches/stumpings	1/–
- Source: Cricinfo, 11 September 2019

John George Sheppard DL (30 January 1824 – 28 May 1882) was an English first-class cricketer.

== Life ==
The son of John Wilson Sheppard and his wife Harriet Crump, he was born on 30 January 1824 at Ashe High House near Woodbridge, Suffolk. He was educated at Harrow School, before going matriculating at Trinity College, Cambridge in 1842.

Sheppard married Harriet Anna Tyrwhitt Jones, the daughter of Sir Thomas Tyrwhitt Jones, in August 1846. He later served as the deputy lieutenant of Suffolk in 1856 and the High Sheriff of Suffolk in 1859. He also served as a justice of the peace for Suffolk.

Sheppard died at London in May 1882.

== Cricketer ==
Though he did not play first-class cricket for Cambridge University, Sheppard made two first-class appearances for the Marylebone Cricket Club (MCC) in 1845, against Cambridge University at Parker's Piece and Oxford University at Oxford. The following year he played a first-class match for the North against the MCC at Lord's.
