= Sir Robert Dycer, 1st Baronet =

English merchant, landowner and baronet

Sir Robert Dycer, 1st Baronet (1595 - 26 August 1667) was an English merchant, landowner and baronet.

Dycer was born in Hackney, Middlesex, the son of Robert Dicer of Wrentham, Suffolk and Elizabeth Maddocks. He was a successful merchant in London during the first half of the 17th century, before siding with the Royalists during the English Civil War. He was rewarded following the Restoration of the monarchy, when he was created a baronet, of Uphall in the County of Hertford in the Baronetage of England on 18 March 1661. He also served as High Sheriff of Suffolk.

He married Dorothy Styles in 1643 and they had two children. He was succeeded in his title and estate by his son, Robert.

Political offices
Preceded by Samuel Blackaby	High Sheriff of Suffolk; 1669	Succeeded by John Clarke
Baronetage of England
New creation	Baronet (of Uphall); 1661–1667	Succeeded by Robert Dycer
