= Calthrop =

Calthrop may refer to:

- Dion Clayton Calthrop (1878–1937), English author, illustrator
- Donald Calthrop (1888–1940), English film actor
- Everard Calthrop (1857–1927), British railway engineer and inventor
- Gladys Calthrop (1894–1980), British artist and set designer
- Guy Calthrop (1870–1919), British railway administrator and brother of Everard

== See also ==
- Caltrop, a weapon used against cavalry
- Calthorpe (disambiguation)
- Calthrop (weed), toxic weed
