= Pierce Lacy =

English stockbroker (1872–1956)

Sir Pierce Lacy Bt JP KCSG
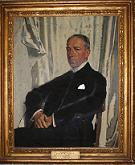
- Born: Pierce Thomas Lacy; 16 February 1872; Edgbaston, Birmingham, England
- Died: 25 December 1956 (aged 84)
- Occupation: Stockbroker

Sir Pierce Thomas Lacy, 1st Baronet, JP, KCSG (16 February 1872 – 25 December 1956) was an English stockbroker.

== Early life and education ==
Lacy was born in Edgbaston, Birmingham, the second of five sons (there were four daughters also) of Wexford-born John Pierce Lacy (1839-1906) of Oakmount, Edgbaston, and his second wife, Mary, née Conick (died 1914). John Pierce Lacy was chairman of Docker Brothers Ltd and a former partner in a galvanisers and iron merchants business, who bought controlling interests in the Kynoch ammunition makers and Brown, Marshalls and Co. Ltd., manufacturers of railway carriages, and made a success of both. Lacy's grandfather, James Lacy, was of Garryrichard House, Enniscorthy, County Wexford, Ireland. Lacy was educated at St George's College, Weybridge.

== Career ==
Lacy practised as a stockbroker in Birmingham, becoming a partner in Cutler & Lacy and chairman of the Birmingham Stock Exchange. He founded and chaired the British Trusts Association in 1917 and the British Shareholders Trust in 1921. He was created a Baronet in the 1921 Birthday Honours for his contributions to finance and appointed High Sheriff of Suffolk for 1927/28. He lived at that time at Ampton Hall, Ampton, Bury St Edmunds.

== Personal life ==
In 1898, Lacy married Ethel Maud, daughter of James Finucane Draper, of St Helier, Jersey. They had one son, Maurice John Pierce Lacy (2 April 1900–22 April 1965), who succeeded as 2nd Baronet, and five surviving daughters, with another having died aged only one day.

== See also ==
- Lacy Baronets

Baronetage of the United Kingdom
New creation	Baronet (of Ampton); 1921–1956	Succeeded by Maurice Lacy
