= James Dawkins (antiquarian) =

British politician and antiquarian

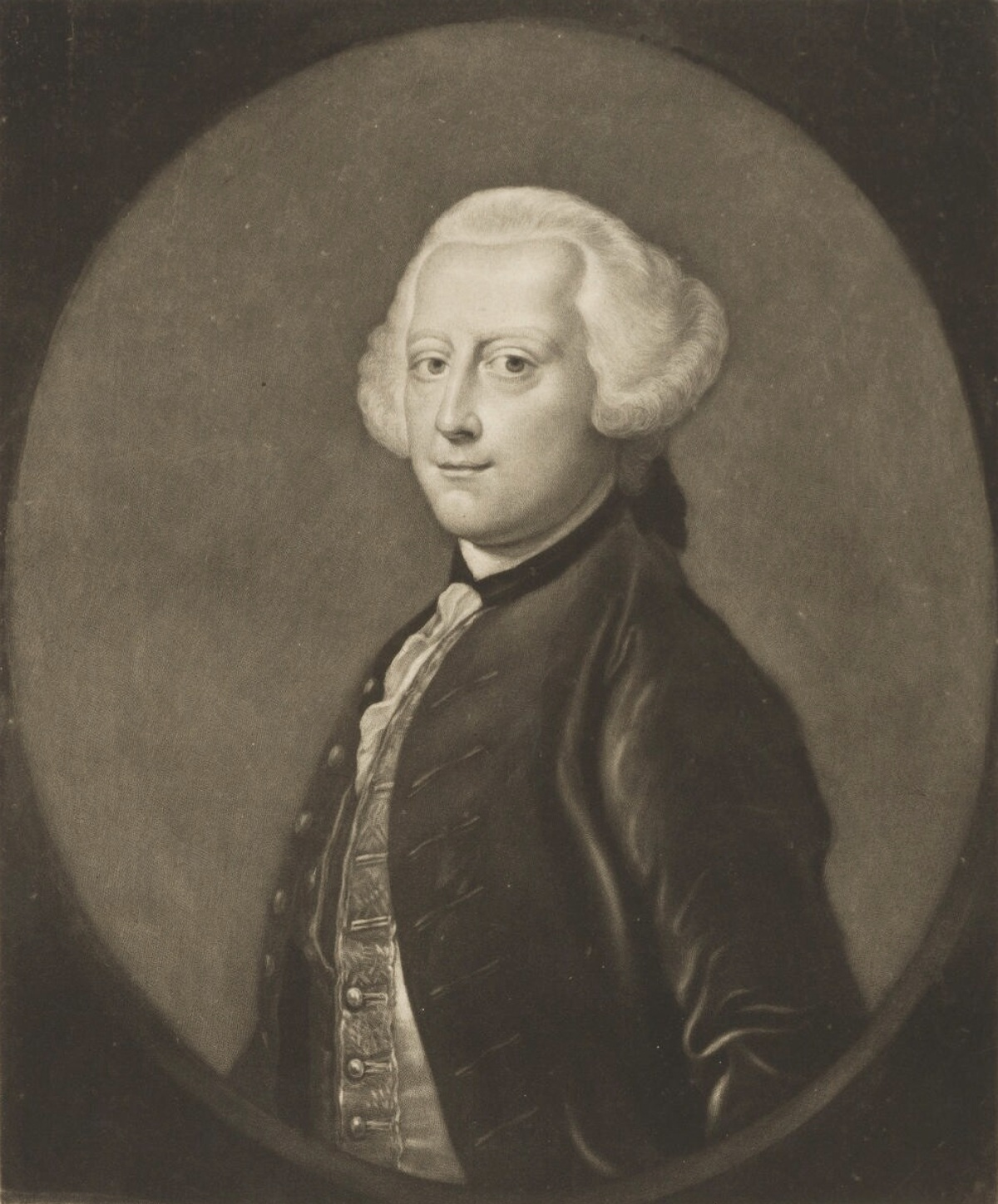
- Engraving by James MacArdell after a portrait by J. Stuart, c. 1760

Member of the House of Commons for Hindon
- In office 1754–1757
- Preceded by: Francis Delaval
- Succeeded by: James Calthorpe

Personal details
- Born: 1722 Jamaica, British West Indies
- Died: 6 September 1757 (aged 64–65) Jamaica, British West Indies
- Education: St John's College, Oxford (DCL)

James Dawkins (1722 – 6 September 1757) was a British politician and antiquarian who represented Hindon in the House of Commons of Great Britain from 1754 to 1757.

== Early life and education ==
The Dawkins family settled on Jamaica shortly after its seizure from the Spanish in 1655. James was the eldest son born to Henry Dawkins I (1698–1744), who was a wealthy sugar planter and slave owner of Clarendon, Jamaica, and his wife, Elizabeth (1697?–1757), third daughter of Edward Pennant of Clarendon, chief justice of the island and of Elizabeth Moore. His brothers were major slave owner William Dawkins (d. 1753) and Henry Dawkins II.

He went to England for his education, attending John Roysse's free school in Abingdon (now Abingdon School) (then headed by the Tory Thomas Woods) and matriculating at St John's College, Oxford on 7 December 1739. His father died in 1744 bequeathing to James 14,300 acres (and making smaller bequests to the two younger sons William and Henry). His plantations included Parnassus Estate, Dawkins Caymanas, Dawkins Salt Pond Pen, Friendship, Leicesterdfields and Old Plantation.

James graduated with a DCL in 1749.

== Career ==
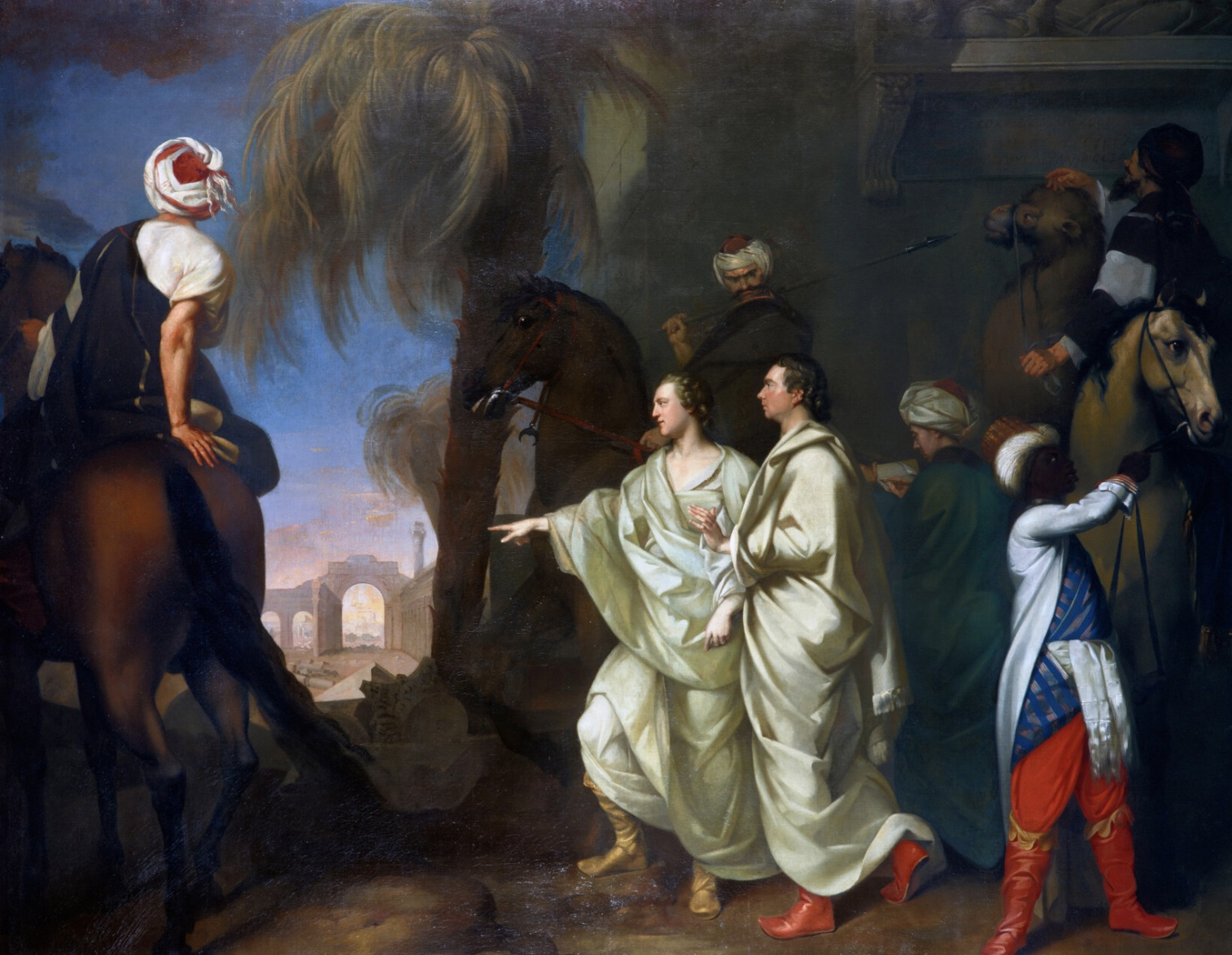
James Dawkins and Robert Wood Discovering the Ruins of Palmyra (Gavin Hamilton, 1758)

He embarked on a continental Grand Tour to Paris then Rome, meeting more Jacobite sympathisers along with the experienced traveller Robert Wood. On 5 May 1750, Wood, Dawkins, Dawkins' Oxford friend John Bouverie and the Italian draughtsman Giovanni Borra set off from Naples in the Matilda to tour and study the Aegean, the coast of Anatolia, Egypt, Nazareth, Syria (including the ruins of Palmyra and Baalbek), Tripoli and Cyprus, returning in Naples on 7 June 1751. Borra, Wood and Dawkins returned to England, where Dawkins funded Wood's publication of as well as that of James Stuart and Nicholas Revett's The Antiquities of Athens (it was on Stuart's suggestion that, in 1755, Dawkins was elected to the Society of Dilettanti).

In May 1753, Dawkins travelled to Berlin to meet Frederick the Great, in an inconclusive attempt to gain his support for a Jacobite conspiracy by William King of Oxford, the earl of Westmorland, and the Prussian ambassador Earl Marischal. The British government issued a warrant for Dawkins's arrest in retaliation, but it was not put into effect when he returned to England in 1754. Once back, he bought an estate in Laverstoke and was elected MP for the open borough of Hindon, he held the position until 1757. He also owned, with his brother Henry, the 25,000-acre (100 km^{2}) Sutton's Plantation in Jamaica.

The anonymous 1756 pamphlet, Reflections physical and moral upon the ... numerous phenomena ... which have happened from the earthquake at Lima, attributed to Dawkins, shows his philosophy to have been opposed to that of Rene Descartes and Isaac Newton. On his death in Jamaica in 1757, unmarried, he was buried in Old Plantation, Clarendon before he and his parents' remains were reburied in St Paul's Church, Chapelton, Jamaica when the family estates were sold in 1922.

== See also ==
- List of Old Abingdonians

== Sources ==
- "Dawkins, James". Oxford Dictionary of National Biography (online ed.). Oxford University Press. doi:10.1093/ref:odnb/7338. (Subscription, Wikipedia Library access or UK public library membership required.)

Parliament of Great Britain
Preceded by Francis Blake Delaval; Bisse Richards	Member of Parliament for Hindon; 1754–1757; With: Bisse Richards 1754–1756; William Mabbott 1756–1757	Succeeded by William Mabbott; James Calthorpe
