= Baptist May =

English courtier (1628–1698)

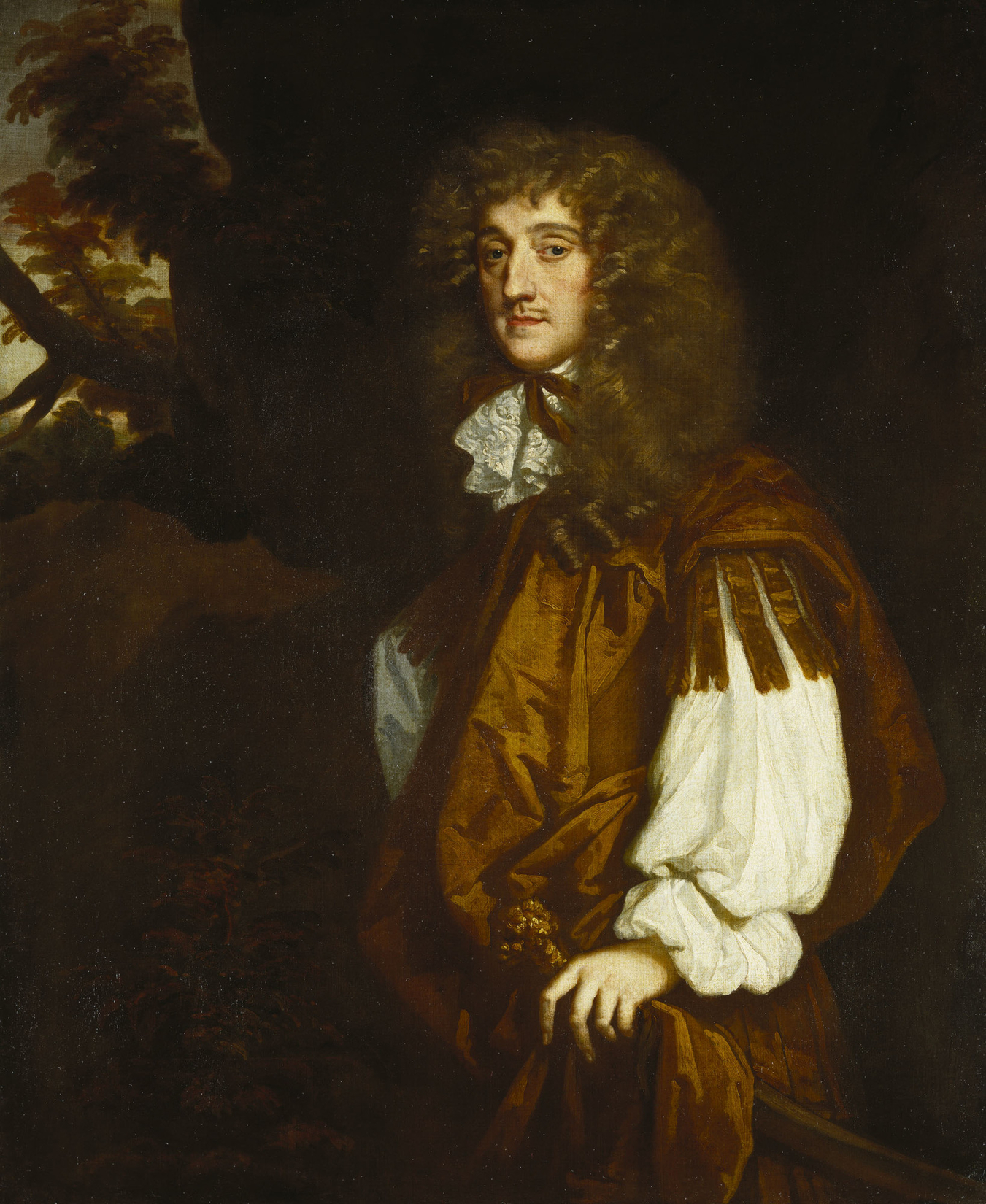
Baptist May

Baptist ('Bab') May (1628–1698) was a Royal courtier during the reign of Charles II of England. He is said to have been Charles's closest and most trusted servant, largely as a result of his knowledge that the king did not like to be approached on matters of business.

May was born in Mid Lavant, the son of Sir Humphrey May, Chancellor of the Duchy of Lancaster and his second wife, Judith daughter of Sir William Poley. He was a cousin of Hugh May, the architect. Baptist was appointed Groom of the Bedchamber to the Duke of York (the future James II) in 1662 and Keeper of the Privy Purse to the King three years later, thanks to the influence of Charles's mistress, Barbara Palmer (née Villiers), Countess of Castlemaine. Castlemaine wanted to ensure that the Keeper was an ally; this would ensure that the payments due to her would become a high priority.

He was nominated by the Duke of York as MP for Winchelsea; however, he lost the election. He joined the Countess of Castlemaine to bring down Edward Hyde, Earl of Clarendon in 1667. In 1670 he was elected MP for Midhurst, sitting until 1679, and in 1690 was elected for Windsor, only to be unseated a few months later on petition.

Despite being Keeper of the Privy Purse, May did not enjoy control over the king's private finances. Surviving documents show that the payments by May were routine payments. However, he enjoyed the king's confidence throughout his reign, despite May's offhand remarks. For example, according to Clarendon's biography, after the Great Fire of London in 1666, he remarked that it was welcomed, to make the city more controllable. This shocked those around him, including the king.

Another test of their friendship began in 1679. As a result of Titus Oates's fictitious claims that several Catholic members of the Royal Household were plotting to kill the king and put his Catholic brother on the throne, known as the Popish Plot, there was a wave of anti-Catholicism throughout England. The Whig faction in parliament, led by the Earl of Shaftesbury and the Duke of Buckingham, was pressing the king to divorce his barren queen, Catherine of Braganza, and remarry to produce a Protestant heir. May was one of the Whig supporters, and narrowly escaped dismissal from his office in the bedchamber as a result.

After Charles's death in 1685, the Duke of York came to the throne as James II. May was dismissed from the office of Keeper of the Privy Purse. However, he remained Ranger of Windsor Great Park, and continued to live at what later became known as Cumberland Lodge, until his death. In 1690 he was elected MP for Thetford, holding the seat until the next general election in 1695. May died unmarried in 1698 and was buried in St George's Chapel, Windsor Castle.

Babmaes Street in St James's is named after Baptist May.

Court offices
Preceded by Charles Berkeley, 1st Earl of Falmouth	Keeper of the Privy Purse; 1665–1685	Succeeded by James Graham
Honorary titles
Vacant Title last held by Philip Herbert, 4th Earl of Pembroke	Ranger of Windsor Great Park; 1671–1698	Succeeded by William Bentinck, 1st Earl of Portland
Parliament of England
Preceded by John Lewknor; John Steward	Member of Parliament for Midhurst; 1670–1679; With: John Steward	Succeeded by Sir William Morley; John Alford
Preceded by Algernon May; Henry Powle	Member of Parliament for Windsor; 1690; With: Algernon May	Succeeded by Sir Charles Porter; William Adderley
Preceded by Francis Guybon; William Harbord	Member of Parliament for Thetford; 1690–1695; With: Francis Guybon	Succeeded by Joseph Williamson; Sir John Wodehouse, 4th Baronet
