= Great Saxham =

Village in Suffolk, England

Coordinates: 52.232°N 0.613°E

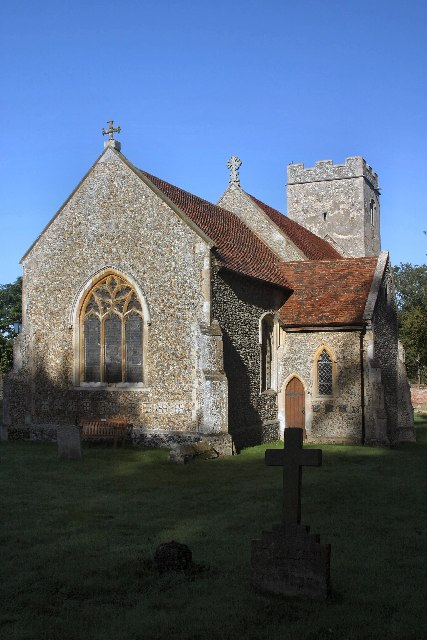
- St Andrew's Church, Great Saxham

- Location within Suffolk
- Civil parish: The Saxhams
- District: West Suffolk
- Shire county: Suffolk
- Region: East
- Country: England
- Sovereign state: United Kingdom
- Post town: Bury St Edmunds
- Postcode district: IP29

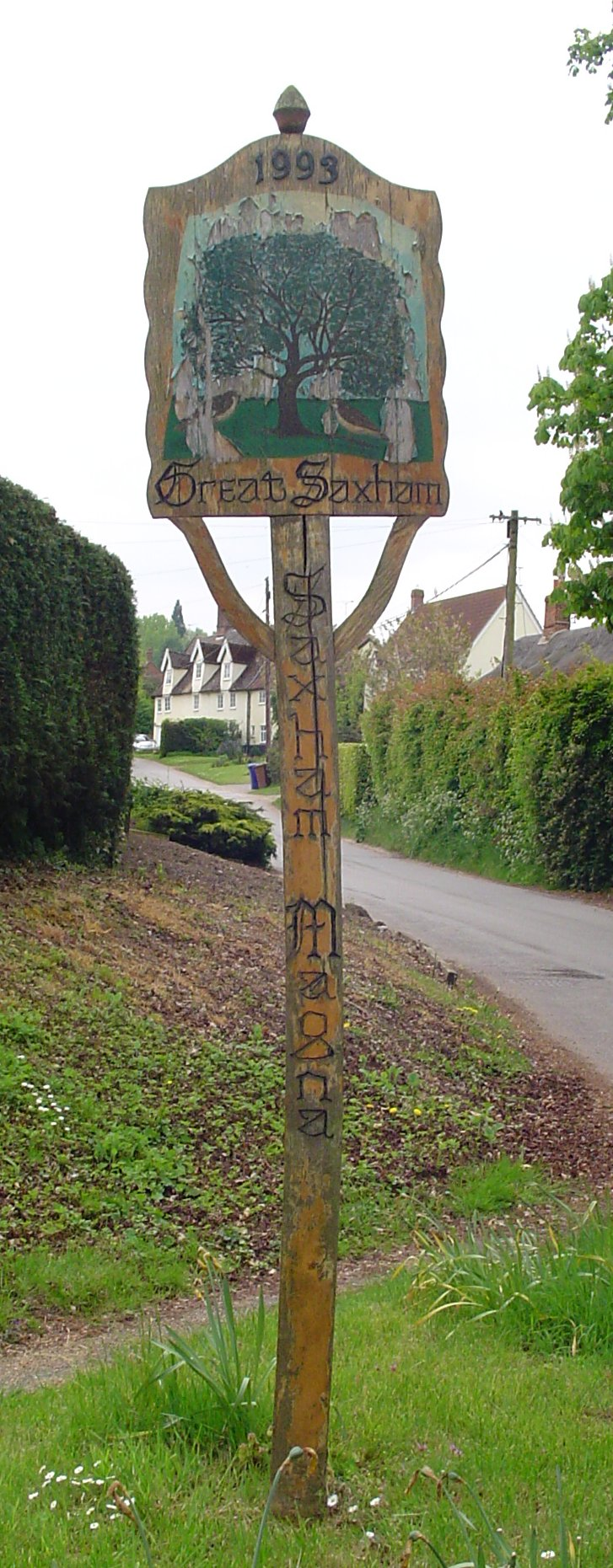
Village sign in Great Saxham

Great Saxham is a village and former civil parish, now in the parish of The Saxhams, in the West Suffolk district, in the county of Suffolk, England. The village appears as Sexham in the Domesday Book of 1086, and Saxham Magna in 1254. Saxham Hall is situated in the village. In 1961 the parish had a population of 189. On 1 April 1988 the parish was merged with Little Saxham to form "The Saxhams".
