= Dycer baronets =

Extinct baronetcy in the Baronetage of England

The Dycer Baronetcy, of Uphall in the County of Hertford, was a title in the Baronetage of England. It was created on 18 March 1661 for Robert Dycer. The title became extinct on the early death of the third Baronet in 1676.

== Dycer baronets, of Uphall (1661) ==
- Sir Robert Dycer, 1st Baronet (c. 1595 – 1667)
- Sir Robert Dycer, 2nd Baronet (c. 1644 – c. 1675)
- Sir Robert Dycer, 3rd Baronet (1667–1676)
