= Ampton =

Village in Suffolk, England

Coordinates: 52.3066°N 00.7370°E

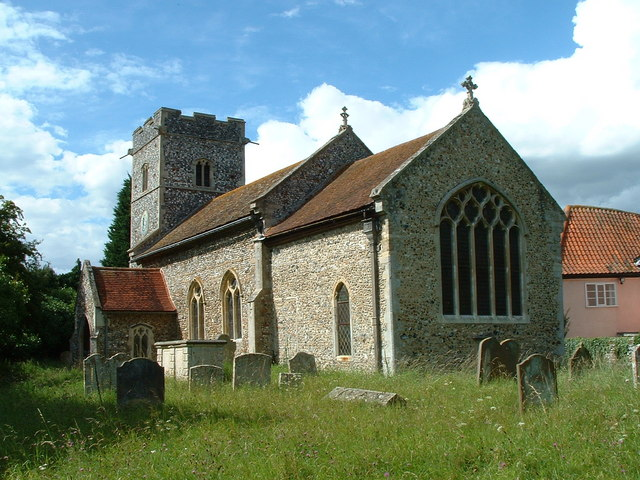
- Church of St Peter & St Paul

- Location within Suffolk
- Interactive map of Ampton
- Area: 14.15 km^{2} (5.46 sq mi)
- Population: 171 (2011) including Little Livermere & Timworth
  - Density: 12/km^{2} (31/sq mi)
- OS grid reference: TL8671
- District: West Suffolk District Council
- Shire county: Suffolk
- Region: East
- Country: England
- Sovereign state: United Kingdom
- Post town: Bury St Edmunds
- Postcode district: IP31
- Dialling code: 01284
- Police: Suffolk
- Fire: Suffolk
- Ambulance: East of England
- UK Parliament: Bury St Edmunds and Stowmarket

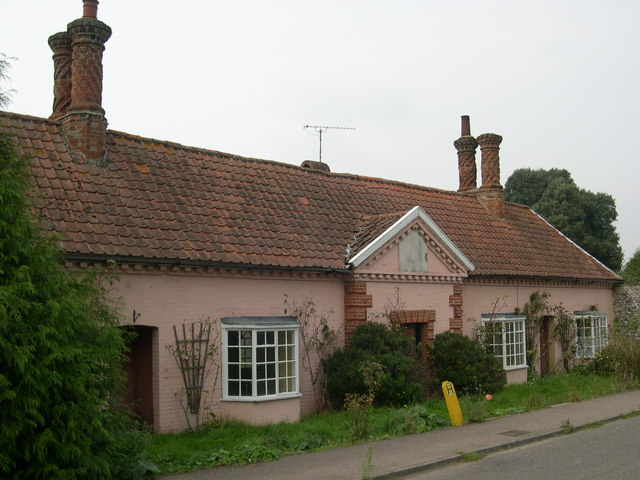
Almshouses in Ampton

Ampton is a village and civil parish in the West Suffolk District of Suffolk, England, about five miles north of Bury St Edmunds.

According to Eilert Ekwall the meaning of the village name is 'Amma's homestead'.

According to the 2001 census the parish had a population of 63, including Little Livermere and Timworth, increasing to 171 at the 2011 Census.

The parish is grouped with Little Livermere and Timworth to form a parish meeting.

Ampton currently has 13 listed structures within it, 12 of them Grade II listed and SS Peter & Paul's church being Grade I listed.

At the church hang four bells, with the heaviest weighing 8-1 cwt and dating from 1405.

Most of the village was designated as a conservation area on 5 March 1987.

The village's racecourse hosts the South Suffolk Show, an annual one-day agricultural show which was first organised in 1888.

Vice-Admiral Robert FitzRoy FRS, the scientist who achieved lasting fame as the captain of HMS Beagle during Charles Darwin's famous voyage, was born in the village. He also coined the phrase ‘Weather Forecast’ when he founded the predecessor to the Meteorological Office.

== History ==
The Domesday Book of 1086 records the population of Ampton in 1086 to be 23 households. The parish was part of Thedwastre Hundred.

=== Historial writings ===
In 1870–1872, John Marius Wilson's Imperial Gazetteer of England and Wales described the village as:

AMPTON, a parish in Thingoe district, Suffolk; 5 miles N of Bury St. Edmunds r. station. It has a post office under Bury St. Edmunds. Acres, 736. Real property, £910. Pop., 131. Houses, 28. Ampton Hall, the seat of H. Rodwell, Esq., is a large brick edifice, in a spacious park. The living is a rectory in the diocese of Ely. Value, £172.* Patron, Hun. Rodwell, Esq. The church is a plain brick building, with a stone tower, and has a brass. Charities, Calthorpes' school, almshouses., £440.

In 1887, John Bartholomew also wrote an entry on Ampton in the Gazetteer of the British Isles with a much shorter description:

Ampton, par. and seat, W. Suffolk, 5 miles N. of Bury St Edmunds, 736 ac., pop. 97; P.O.

== Ampton Hall ==
A Grade II-listed Jacobean style manor house built in 1892 on the site of the previous hall. The main residence of the Ampton estate which owns 700 acre park and a large majority of the housing in the area.

== Ampton Charities ==
=== School ===
Ampton Charity School Trust was established by James Calthorpe (1649–1702) in 1692 for the education of six poor boys of Ampton and the neighbouring parishes. The Old School House, dated 1705, is a Grade II listed building a bears a plaque commemorating its principal benefactor in a Latin inscription. By 1844 the school was part of the National Schools system.

=== Almshouses ===
In her will dated 18 May 1693 Dorothy Calthorpe left £1,000 for the construction of almshouses in the village for "six poor old widows or old maids"

== Notable residents ==
- James Calthorpe (until 1658), Roundhead & Sheriff of Suffolk.
- Dorothy Calthorpe (1648-1693), early female author
- Algernon May (until 1704), Member of Parliament for Windsor.
- Reynolds Calthorpe (1655–1719), Member of Parliament for Hindon.
- James Calthorpe (1699–1784), politician and courtier, Gentleman Usher Quarterly Waiter in Ordinary, Yeoman of the Removing Wardrobe, and Member of Parliament for Hindon.
- Henry Venn Elliott (1792–1865), an English divine.
- Henry George Boldero (1794–1873), British Army officer and a Member of Parliament for Chippenham.
- Robert FitzRoy (1805–1865), English officer of the Royal Navy, pioneering meteorologist and founder of the Met Office, captain of HMS Beagle during Charles Darwin's famous voyage.
- Henry Cotterill (1812–1886), Bishop of Grahamstown and Bishop of Edinburgh in the 1800s.
- Pierce Lacy (1872–1956), English stockbroker, chairman of the Birmingham Stock Exchange.
