= Removing Wardrobe =

The Removing Wardrobe was a sub-department of the British Royal Household. It was responsible for looking after the furnishings which travelled from palace to palace. The office was headed by the Yeoman of the Removing Wardrobe (a sinecure office), assisted by two grooms and three pages, all appointed by the Lord Chamberlain. The department was abolished in 1782. The first Yeoman of the Removing Wardrobe was Clement Kinnersley, the man who saved the Coronation Spoon, the oldest of the Crown Jewels of the United Kingdom used in the Coronation.

== Yeomen of the Removing Wardrobe ==
- 1660–1662: Clement Kinnersley
- 1662–1674: Luke Wilkes
- 1674–1689: Philip Kinnersley
- 1689–1693: T. Sackville
- 1693–1707: Peter Hume
- 1708–1710: George Davenant
- 1710–1743: Hon. G. Maynard (and Keeper of the Standing Wardrobe at St. James's Palace)
- 1743–1782: James Calthorpe

== Sources ==
- Bucholz, R. O. - Office-Holders in Modern Britain: Volume 11 (revised)
