= Ranger of Windsor Great Park =

UK appointment by monarch to oversee Windsor Great Park

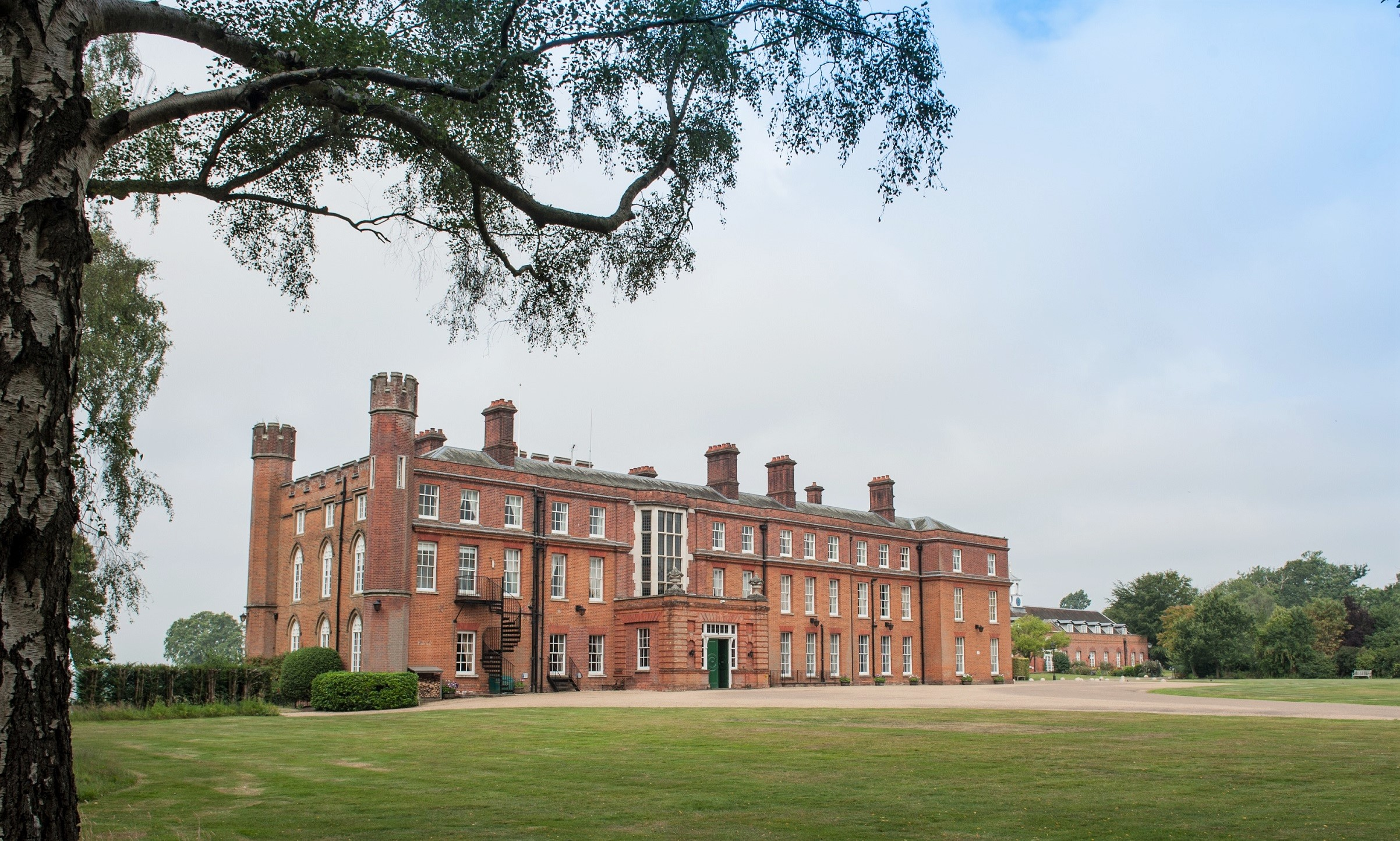
Cumberland Lodge, the Ranger's official residence

The office of Ranger of Windsor Great Park was established to oversee the protection and maintenance of the Great Park at Windsor in the English county of Berkshire. The ranger has always been somebody close to the monarch.

Apart from a single 15th century reference to the office, it appears to have been created in 1601. From the time of appointment of Baptist May - often claimed to be the most trusted friend of Charles II - the ranger has been given the use of the Great Lodge (now called Cumberland Lodge) as a residence. One of the most famous rangers was Sarah Churchill, Duchess of Marlborough, who was given the position by her friend, Queen Anne, in 1702. Officially, at least, she shared the office with other family members. After her death, the rangership was given to successive trusted friends and family members of the British royal family. The office is currently held by King Charles III.

Cumberland Lodge within the Park ceased to be the official residence for the rangers in 1917. In 1947, King George VI gave the house to the King George VI and Queen Elizabeth Foundation of St Catharine, who continue to have the use of the building.

== List of Rangers ==
- Sir Charles Howard, later Earl of Nottingham (1601–1616)
- Sir Edward Nicholas (1644–1662)
- Philip Herbert, 4th Earl of Pembroke (1648–1650)
- Baptist May, trusted friend of Charles II (1671–1697)
- William Bentinck, 1st Earl of Portland, boyhood friend of William III (1697–1702)
- Sarah Churchill, Duchess of Marlborough, closest friend of Queen Anne (1702–1744)
- John Spencer, grandson of the above (1744–1746)
- Prince William, Duke of Cumberland, son of George II (1746–1765)
- Prince Henry, Duke of Cumberland and Strathearn, brother of George III (1765–1790). When Prince Henry died, his wife continued to live at Cumberland Lodge until her death in 1803.
- Prince Albert, husband of Queen Victoria (1840–1861)
- Prince Christian of Schleswig-Holstein, son-in-law of Queen Victoria (1867–1917)
- George V (1917–1936)
- George VI (1937–1952)
- Prince Philip, Duke of Edinburgh, husband of Elizabeth II (1952–2021)
- Charles III (since 2022)

== Role ==
The Ranger's role is to guide the direction and overall operations of the Park. The former ranger (Prince Philip) had tried to make it more open to the public, more sustainable, and to keep it going for future generations. In an interview for the BBC TV programme The Queen's Castle he gave a tour of the Park, explaining his thoughts and actions in making decisions to open the Farm Shop, cut down trees, move various facilities, and to open up the park to deer as well as people.
