= Stoke Hall, Ipswich =

Georgian stately home in Suffolk, England

Coordinates: 52.0504°N 1.1517°E

Stoke Hall was a Georgian stately home in Ipswich, in the county of Suffolk, England. It was built in 1744 and the main house was demolished in 1915. The stables and the underground cellars still survive. The cellars were a major air raid shelter in the Second World War.
