= James Calthorpe (Roundhead) =

James Calthorpe (died 1658) of Ampton who was Sheriff of Suffolk, in 1656, during the Protectorate of Oliver Cromwell, by whom he was knighted at Whitehall, 10 December, in the same year.

== Biography ==
Calthorpe was the third son, and the only one of ten children of Sir Henry Calthorpe and his wife Dorothy (daughter and heiress of Edward Humphrey) to survive to adulthood. He was educated at Catherine Hall, Cambridge.

He was Sheriff of Suffolk, in 1656, during the Protectorate of Oliver Cromwell, by whom he was knighted at Whitehall, 10 December, in the same year.

James Calthorpe survived his father by twenty-one years, being interred in the chancel of Ampton Church the same day of the month on which Sir Henry died, 1 August 1658. (Note: There is a proration of James Calthorp in Francis Blomefield's History of Norfolk, vol. vii., p. 56, (A.P. 1883, p. 17))

== Family ==
Calthorpe married Dorothy, second daughter of Sir James Reynolds, of Castle Camps, Cambridgeshire, and sister to Sir John Reynolds, Commissary-General in Ireland, on whose death she became his sole heiress). (Note: The marriage contract of 10 May 1645, agrees that Sir James covenants to give his daughter a portion of £800 for the payment of which he assigns over an estate called Gouldstons, in the parish of Ashdon, Essex.) They had three sons and six daughters who were still living when he died in August 1658:

- James (1649–1702), was nine years old when his father died. He inhered his father's, estate and during his adult life endowed a hospital for boys in Ampton (It was a school for six pupils). His brother Christopher inherited the estate.
- Christopher (1652–1717), he married Elizabeth, one of the daughters and coheirs of Gardiner Kettleborough, of Elmswell in Suffolk, they had two sons, James 1699–1784) who became a politician and courtier; and Henry (1703–1780) who became a rector and never married; and three daughters. As Henry predeceased James and he also died unmarried, with his death, the direct male line of his family became extinct.
- Reynolds(1655–1719). He was a member of parliament, married twice and had several children.
- Henrietta-Mary.
- Dorothy (1648–1693) she bequeathed £1,000 for the endowment of an alms-house in Ampton, for six poor old widows or old maids of the age of sixty years and upwards and another £500 to help apprentice poor boys into handicraft trades in the town of Bury St. Edmunds. She died unmarried.
- Barbara (born 1651).
- Katherine, (1656–1707), on 10 February 1680 married the Rev. Robert Lowe, Rector of Ingham in Suffolk.
- Jane (1657–1680), married Mr. Mordaunt Cracherode, citizen of London.
- Elizabeth, (1658–1686), married the Rev. Charles Trumbull, LL.D. Rector of Hadleigh.

After Calthorpe's death, Dorothy remarried. On 15 June 1662, she married Sir Algernon May of Old Windsor, Berkshire, with whom she had several children.
