= Saxham Hall =

House in The Saxhams, Suffolk, England

Coordinates: 52.232000°N 0.613000°E

Great Saxham Hall is a two-storey Palladian house situated at Great Saxham, just outside Bury St Edmunds in Suffolk, England. It is a Grade II* listed building. (Buildings and monuments can be listed as Grade I, Grade II, or Grade II*. Grade II* buildings are particularly important buildings of more than special interest; only 5.5% of listed buildings are Grade II*.)

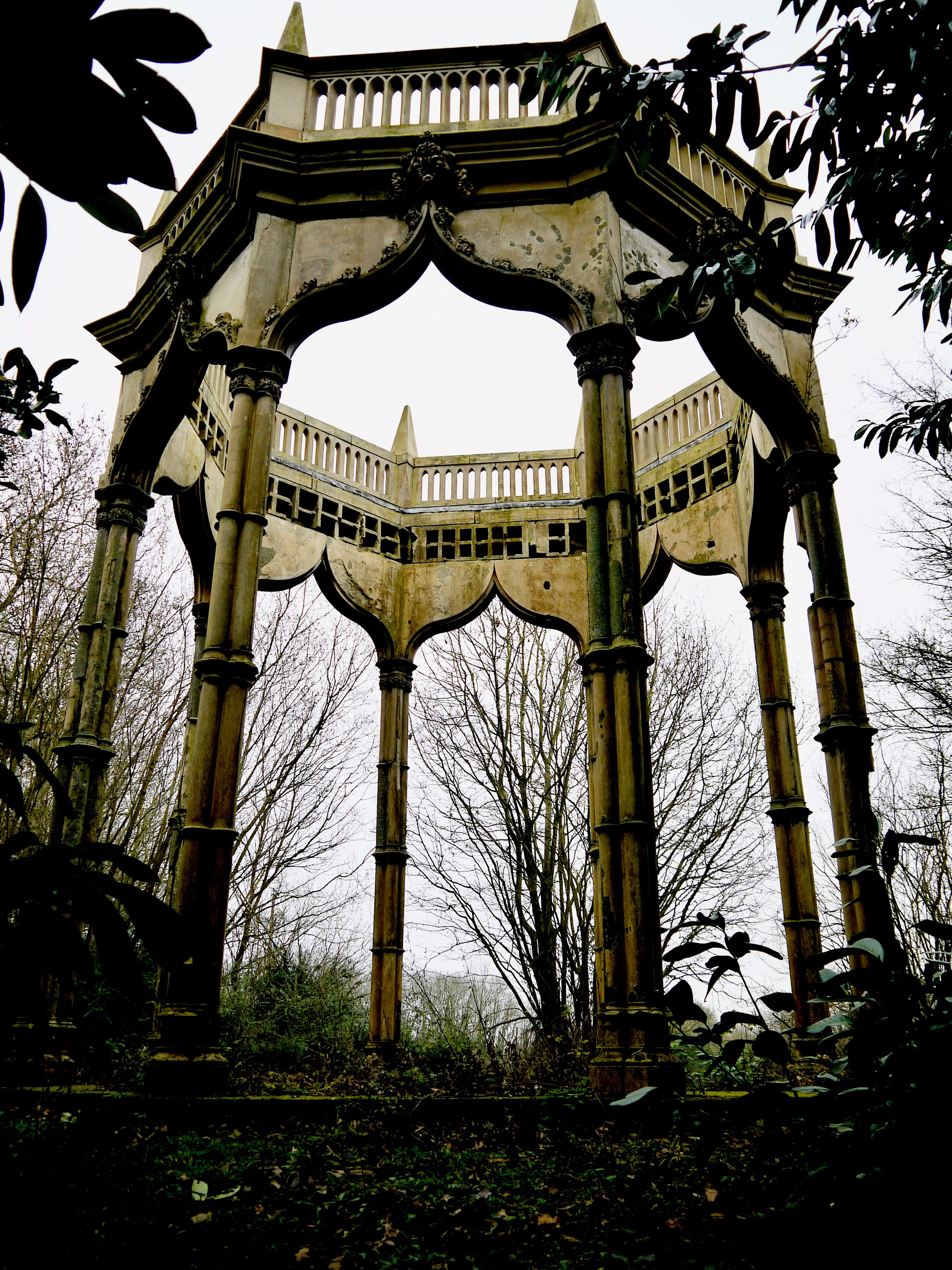
The Umbrello at Saxham Hall, is actually situated in Little Saxham

The hall was designed by Joseph Patience and dates from 1798. Its most striking feature is the large, generous portico, which has a pediment with arms and large columns. Inside, fine painted ceilings are of note, along with a room 'reputedly' (this has not been officially confirmed by experts) decorated by the 18th-century artist Angelica Kauffman R.A.

The house is owned by Colonel and Mrs David Gordon Lennox and is occasionally opened to the public. In most cases, a condition of accepting an English Heritage grant is that the owner provides access to the general public so that they can see any completed work, paid for by that grant. As of 2014, the property is rumoured to have been purchased by a property developer, so its future as a whole architectural example is in doubt.

The gardens are reputedly by Capability Brown and feature a polygonal lodge house, a Moorish temple (The Umbrello), and The Tea House.

The early 19th-century Moorish temple – 'The Umbrello' – stands within the grounds of the estate, and is Grade II* listed, but The Umbrello has been on the English Heritage 'HERITAGE AT RISK' register, list entry number:1031410, for a number of years. This important architectural structure is one of only a few remaining garden buildings constructed of Coade Stone. The Umbrello has been in a serious state of decline for many years, and is in very poor condition: the roof is missing, and ingress of water is rusting the structure's iron core. In 1998, the owner submitted a Listed Building Application to dismantle the Umbrello and resurrect it in a new location but the application was withdrawn and the work was not carried out.

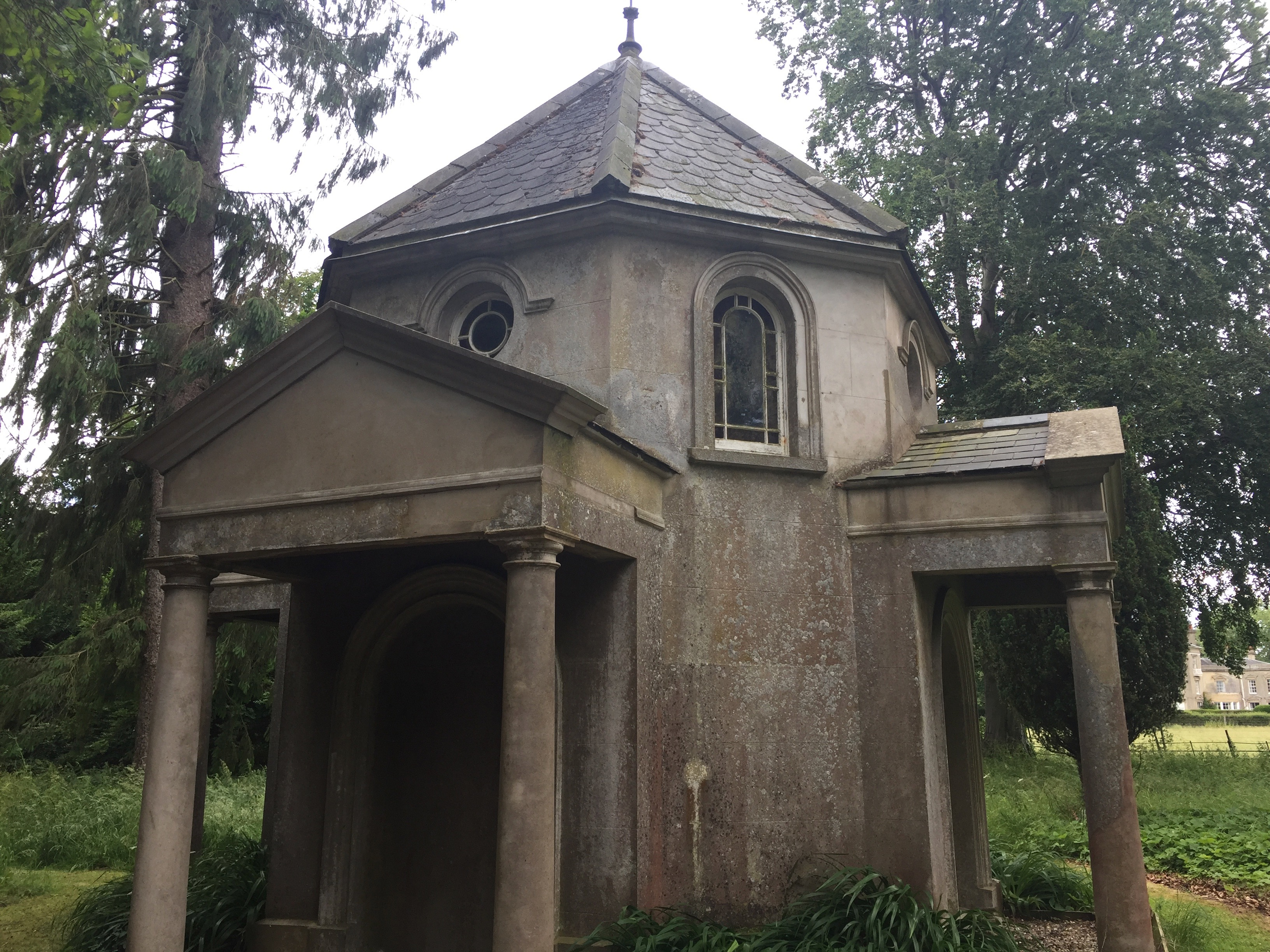
The Tea House, a grade II listed garden structure in the grounds of Saxham Hall

The Tea House structure is a late C18, possibly by Capability Brown as part of his possible landscaping work at Great Saxham Hall. The structure is Grade II listed; it is octagonal, has stuccoed brick walls, and fish scale slated pyramid roof. There are gabled porticoes on four sides with Tuscan columns supporting a pediment with slated roof. Above each is a circular window with moulded architrave and arched head. Within each portico a niche with semi-circular head; one contains instead, a pair of three-panelled doors. The Tea House is in poor condition.
