= Ryan baronets =

Baronetcy in the Baronetage of the United Kingdom

The Ryan Baronetcy, of Hintlesham in the County of Suffolk, is a title in the Baronetage of the United Kingdom. It was created on 8 September 1919 for Gerald Ryan, later General Manager and Chairman of Phoenix Insurance Co.

== Ryan baronets, of Hintelsham (1919) ==
- Sir Gerald Hemmington Ryan, 1st Baronet (1861 –1937)
- Sir Gerald Ellis Ryan, 2nd Baronet (1888–1947)
- Sir Derek Gerald Ryan, 3rd Baronet (1922–1990)
- Sir Derek Gerald Ryan, 4th Baronet (born 1954)

The heir presumptive is the present holder's cousin Barry Desmond Ryan (born 1943). His heir apparent is his eldest son Lerato Ryan.
