= Ampton Hall =

Manor house in Ampton, Suffolk, England

Coordinates: 52.3061°N 0.7379°E

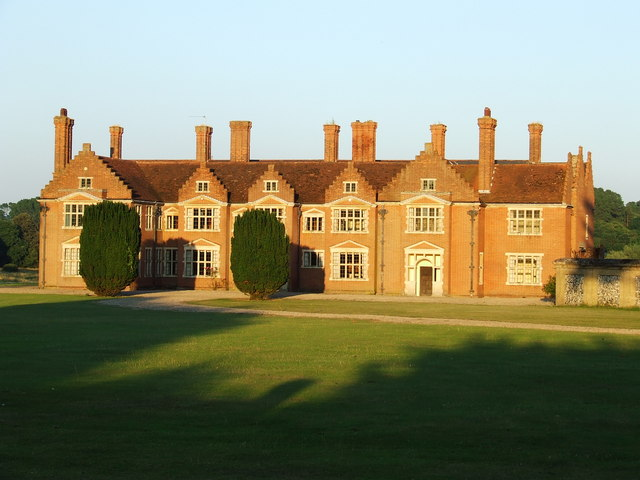
Ampton Hall

Ampton Hall is a Grade II-listed Jacobean style manor house in Ampton, Suffolk, England.

Ampton Hall was the birthplace in 1805 of Robert FitzRoy, who became the second Governor of New Zealand.

It later belonged to the Paley family: John Paley (1839-1894) was High Sheriff of Suffolk for 1889–90 and his son George Arthur Paley (1874-1941) High Sheriff in 1906–07.

The Hall was destroyed by fire on 3 January 1885 and re-built in 1892 by Eustace Balfour and Hugh Thackeray Turner of London. It has gardens designed by Capability Brown and a lake.

During the First World War, the house was used as an auxiliary hospital.

The property was acquired by Sir Pierce Lacy, Bt., a stockbroker, who was appointed High Sheriff of Suffolk for 1927–28. When he died in 1956 the contents of the house were sold at auction.
