= James Calthorpe of East Barsham =

James Calthorpe (1604 – 19 April 1652) of East Barsham Norfolk, was a Sheriff of Norfolk in 1643.

== Family ==
Around 1627 Calthorpe married firstly Mary (c.1612–1640), daughter of William Fermor and Anne, daughter of Robert Brooke. All their children died before she did.

Calthorpe married secondly Katherine (1616-1677), daughter of Sir Edward Lewknor (died 1618) and Mary Neville. They had a son Christopher Calthorpe (died 1718), (who became a Knight of the Bath and married Dorothy, daughter of Sir William Spring); and two daughters Elizabeth and Ann (who married Sir Thomas Le Strang).
