= The Saxhams =

Civil parish in Suffolk, England

Coordinates: 52.242°N 0.630°E

- Location within Suffolk
- Population: 300 (2005); 286 (2011)
- District: West Suffolk
- Shire county: Suffolk
- Region: East
- Country: England
- Sovereign state: United Kingdom
- Post town: Bury St Edmunds
- Postcode district: IP29
- Police: Suffolk
- Fire: Suffolk
- Ambulance: East of England

The Saxhams is a civil parish in the West Suffolk district of Suffolk in eastern England. Located around two miles west of Bury St Edmunds, the parish covers the villages of Great Saxham and Little Saxham, as well as the Saxham Industrial Estate on the A14. In 2005 its population was 300. The parish was formed in 1998 from "Great Saxham" and "Little Saxham" and part of Risby.

Until the Beeching Axe, the parish was served by the Saxham and Risby railway station on the Ipswich to Ely Line.
