= Henry Calthorpe =

English lawyer (1586–1637)

Sir Henry Calthorpe (1586–1637), was an English lawyer who acted as solicitor-general to Queen Henrietta Maria, and also as the defence barrister in two high-profile cases: the Darnell's Case (or the Five Knights' case) and the Valentine case. He was Recorder of London in 1635–36 (by king's mandate), attorney of court of wards in 1636, and was knighted the same year.

== Biography ==
Calthorpe, the third son of Sir James Calthorpe of Cockthorpe, Norfolk, and Barbara, daughter of John Bacon of Hesset, Suffolk, was one of a family of eight sons and six daughters, and was born at Cockthorpe in 1586. He entered at the Middle Temple, and seems early to have enjoyed a large and lucrative practice. By the death of his father in 1615 he inherited considerable estates in his native county, but he continued sedulously to devote himself to his profession.

Shortly after the marriage of Charles I Calthorpe was appointed solicitor-general to Queen Henrietta Maria, after whom one of his daughters was named. When in November 1627 the five gentlemen who had been thrown into prison for refusing to contribute to the forced loan applied to the court of king's bench for a writ of habeas corpus, Calthorpe was counsel for Sir Thomas Darnell, being associated in the case with Noy, Serjeant Bramston, and Selden; and we are told that "the gentlemen's counsel pleaded at Westminster with wonderful applause, even of shouting and clapping of hands, which is unusual in that place".

In the proceedings against the seven members in the spring of 1630, Calthorpe was counsel for Benjamin Valentine, one of the three who held down the speaker in the chair. In the conduct of this case he seems to have shown some lack of zeal, though when his turn came to speak he defended his client with conspicuous ability, notwithstanding that his sympathies were with the court party. In December 1635 he succeeded Mason as recorder of London, the corporation having been specially requested to elect him in a letter which Charles I addressed to them on his behalf.

He held the recordership only a few weeks, for in January 1636 he was made attorney of the court of wards and liveries, and resigned the other appointment. Shortly after this he was knighted, and was chosen to be reader of his inn, but he never discharged the duties of his office, causa mortalitatis, as Dugdale notes. He was now in his fifty-first year, and his path seemed clear to the highest legal preferments, but death came upon him in the full vigour of his powers in August 1637.

== Family ==
Calthorpe married Dorothy, daughter and heiress of Edward Humphrey, and with her had a family of ten children, only one of whom, Sir James Calthorpe of Ampton (said to have been knighted by Oliver Cromwell), attained maturity. From him the present Lord Calthorpe is lineally descended.
