= James Calthorpe (Yeoman of the Removing Wardrobe) =

British politician and courtier

- Born: 25 March 1699
- Died: 11 March 1784 (aged 84)
- Citizenship: British
- Occupations: politician and courtier

James Calthorpe, DL (25 March 1699 – 11 March 1784) was a British politician and courtier.

== Biography ==
Calthorpe was born at Elmswell, Suffolk and was the eldest son and heir of Christopher Calthorpe (1652–1717) and his wife, Elizabeth, née Kettleborough (died 1724). After completing his education, he travelled into France and Italy; and leaving Rome in August 1727, arrived in London in the autumn of that year. He was soon after appointed a Deputy Lieutenant for Suffolk on 20 December that year.

By virtue of a warrant by Charles FitzRoy, 2nd Duke of Grafton, the Lord Chamberlain, Calthorpe was sworn and admitted as a Gentleman Usher Quarterly Waiter in Ordinary on 1 October 1731. By another warrant by Grafton dated 16 February 1742, he was appointed Yeoman of the Removing Wardrobe, an office he held until it was abolished in 1782.

Calthorpe first came to reside at his family's ancestral home, Ampton Hall, in 1736, and immediately set about improving his mansion and estate by enlarging the former, and enclosing, planting, and ornamenting the latter; dividing his time in attendance on his official duties in London, and in agricultural and horticultural pursuits, when resident in the country.

In 1754, Calthorpe offered himself as a candidate for the borough of Hindon in Wiltshire, but declined, although sure of his election, in favour of James Dawkins. Upon Dawkin's death in 1757, Calthorpe was elected for the borough on 23 January 1758. He sat until the dissolution of Parliament in 1761.

In 1774, Calthorpe was again a candidate for Hindon, and with Richard Beckford, petitioned against the return of Richard Smith and Thomas Brand Hollis. In consequence of the acts of bribery disclosed, the House of Commons ordered that all four candidates should be prosecuted by the Attorney General. Smith and Hollis were fined £500 each (£48,381.63 in 2007) and imprisoned for three months in the Marshalsea. But at a trial at the Salisbury Assizes in March 1776, Calthorpe was honourably acquitted.

Calthorpe died unmarried at his house on Pall Mall on 11 March 1784 and his remains were interred in the family vault in Ampton church, on 20 March. By his death, the male line of his family became extinct. His relative, Henry Gough (later Lord Calthorpe) inherited his property.

== Notes ==
Court offices
Preceded by John Pinckney	Gentleman Usher Quarterly Waiter in Ordinary; 1731–1747	Succeeded by Lawrence Wright
Preceded by Hon. G. Maynard	Yeoman of the Removing Wardrobe; 1743–1782	Office abolished
Parliament of Great Britain
Preceded by James Dawkins and William Mabbott	Member of Parliament for Hindon; 1758–1761; With: William Mabbott	Succeeded by William Blackstone and Edward Morant
