= James Calthorpe of Cockthorpe =

Sir James Calthorpe (c. 1558–1615) of Cockthorpe, Norfolk was Sheriff of Norfolk in 1614

== Biography ==
James Calthorpe was the son of Christopher Calthorpe, a student in Lincoln's Inn, and Joan his wife (who survived him, and remarried Sir Jerome Bowes, of London).

Calthorpe was a knight on 23 July 1603 in the Royal Garden at Whitehall just before the Coronation of James I, and was Sheriff of Norfolk in 1614. He died on 15 June 1615.

Calthorpe was buried in All Saints Church Cockthorpe where there is a memorial table in at the east end of the south aisle with two coloured shields:

1. Chequy or and azure, a fesse ermine, Calthorp.
2. Calthorp, impaling, Argent, on a fesse engrailed gules, between three escutcheons of the last, as many mullets of the first, Bacon of Hesset.
- A crest: A boar's head couped.
- Inscription:

To God and posterity, in assured hope of a joyful resurrection, resteth the body of S^{r} James Calthorp, Knight, and Dame Barbara his wife, daughter to John Bacon of Hesset, Esq^{rs}. By her he had 8 sons and 6 daughters, in whose several marriages and issue the ancient glory of y^{t} family (resting then chiefly and almost solely in himself) did reflourish and is dilatated into many of the best houses of this country. He was buried the 16th day of June, A.D. 1615, and of his age 57. The said Dame Barbara surviving him, and much comforted with the sight of 193 of her children and their offspring, at the age of 86 years exchanged this life for a better upon the 3d day of November, 1639.

Behold, children are the inheritance of the Lord,
And the fruit of the womb his reward. Ps. 127. 3

== Family ==
Calthorpe married Barbara daughter of Francis Bacon, of Hesset in Suffolk and died June 15, in the 12th of king James. Barbara his wife survived him, and they were both buried and had a monument in the church of Cockthorpe. They had at least three sons:

- Christopher (died 14 March 1624), his son and heir. On 6 November 1602 he married Maud (1584–1624), daughter and co-heir of John Thurton, of Broome in Norfolk. They had five sons and three daughters James, Christopher, Edward, Charles and Oliver and three daughters.
- Henry (1586–1637), their third son became a prominent lawyer.
- Mary, married Hamond Ward, of Letheringsett, and was the mother of the mystic Jane Lead.
