= Little Saxham =

Village in Suffolk, England

Coordinates: 52.23°N 00.62°E

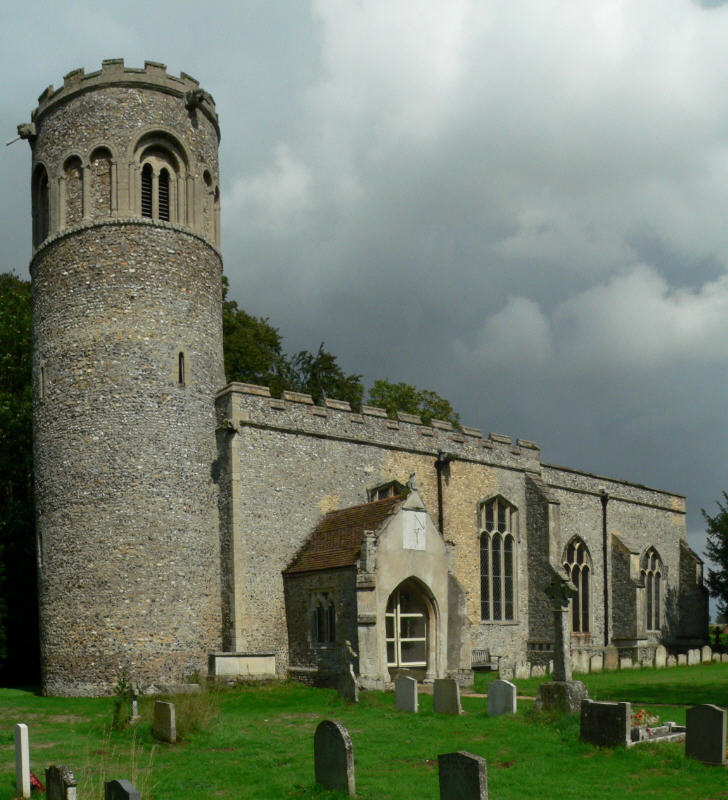
- Little Saxham St Nicholas

- Location within Suffolk
- Civil parish: The Saxhams
- District: West Suffolk
- Shire county: Suffolk
- Region: East
- Country: England
- Sovereign state: United Kingdom

Little Saxham is a village and former civil parish, now in the parish of The Saxhams, in the West Suffolk district, in the county of Suffolk, England. The village appears as Sexham in the Domesday Book and as Saxham Parva in 1254. In 1961 the parish had a population of 92. On 1 April 1988 the parish was merged with Great Saxham to form "The Saxhams".

== Little Saxham St. Nicholas ==
Its church, St Nicholas, is one of 38 existing round-tower churches in Suffolk.

=== Architecture ===
The church is almost entirely of flint construction, the round tower also of flint, having little to reveal the age of building except for the obviously Romanesque arcading in the upper part. The tower resembles the one at nearby Risby - perhaps it is, in the lower part at least, by the same builder, as there are no other round-tower churches nearby. It tapers slightly from bottom to top, a lower window (apparently also Romanesque) having a zigzag design round the sides and arch. A small window in the west side of the tower with a monolithic head seems to match one of the north side with apparently Romanesque tooling. Inside, the tower arch, between tower and nave, is very simple, but it is very tall in proportion to its width, often seen as more of a Saxon than a Norman feature. A capital has a superficial double spiral carving and there is a roll moulding - also Anglo-Saxon features - but they may have been deliberately archaic at the time of construction. The doorway from the south porch to the nave also has an enigmatic roll moulding and similar spirals on the capitals, but the decoration of the arch and the plain tympanum are more credibly Romanesque.

=== Heraldry ===
Heraldry of the church includes, on a late gothic panelled area,

Lucas or Fitz Lucas (Thomas Lucas of Little Saxham Hall, died 1531, Solicitor General to King Henry VII - ?VIII -): Argent, a fesse between six annulets Gules

Lucas (as above) quartering Morieux: Gules, on a bend Argent six (or seven or nine) billets (or billetty) Sable

Kemeys (?) Quarterly, 1st and 4th Argent, a lion rampant Sable, crowned Gules, 2nd and 3rd Vert, on a chevron Argent three broad arrows Sable In a window, with the inscription "Lieut. Col. James Grove White Crofts, died March 1901 ... ": Or, three bulls' heads and necks couped Sable as above. The same surname and arms noted at Sompting Abbotts, Sussex.

=== Other Monuments ===
Other monuments include the matrix of a memorial brass on the floor, with four shield shapes, and, on a dark ledger slab (floor slab) by the altar rails the following inscription:

Hoc Saxo Tegitur Corpus Michaelis Emont Clerici Qui In Hac Ecclesia (Quam per 44 Annos Religiosissime Administrauit) Mortalitatis Exciuias Spe Resurgendi Pie Deposuit Mensis Sextilis Die 14o Anno Ætatis suæ 83 / Salutis 1661 Disce quid est quid eris; Memor esto quod Morieri.

[Attempted translation: "This stone covers the body of Michael Emon cleric who in this church (in which for 44 years he administered most religiously) [without succumbing to pestilence] in the hope of rising again, mercifully passing away in good health aged 83 on 14 August 1661. Learn what is and what you will be; remember that what will be is dying."]
