= Gabriella Wilde =

British actress and model (born 1989)

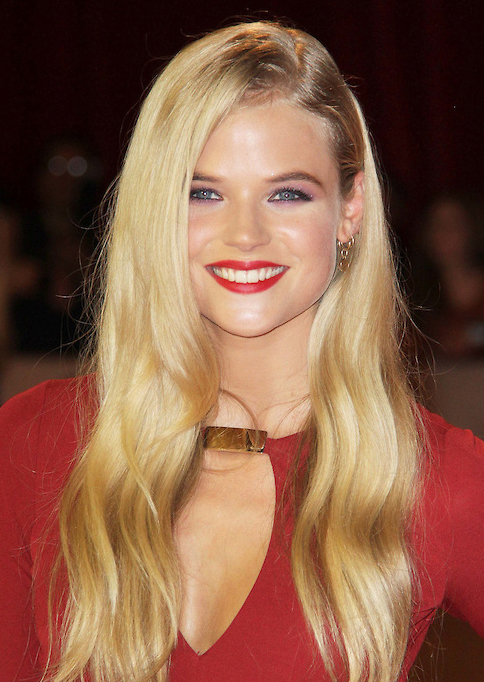
- Wilde at The Three Musketeers world premiere in Westfield, London, 4 October 2011
- Born: Gabriella Zanna Vanessa Anstruther-Gough-Calthorpe; 8 April 1989 (age 37); Basingstoke, Hampshire, England
- Occupations: Actress; model
- Years active: 2003–present
- Spouse: Alan Pownall (m. 2014)
- Children: 3
- Parents: John Anstruther-Gough-Calthorpe (father); Vanessa Hubbard (mother)
- Relatives: Isabella Calthorpe (paternal half-sister); Olivia Llewellyn (maternal half-sister)

Gabriella Zanna Vanessa Anstruther-Gough-Calthorpe (born 8 April 1989), known professionally as Gabriella Wilde or Gabriella Calthorpe, is an English actress and model.

She has appeared in the films St Trinian's 2: The Legend of Fritton's Gold (2009), The Three Musketeers (2011), Carrie (2013), Endless Love (2014), and Wonder Woman 1984 (2020). Her television work includes the Doctor Who episode "The Vampires of Venice" (2010) and the BBC historical drama series Poldark (2016–2019).

== Early life ==
Wilde was born in Basingstoke, Hampshire. She is descended from the aristocratic Gough-Calthorpe family. Her father, businessman John Anstruther-Gough-Calthorpe, is a former chairman of the Watermark Group, and the grandson of Sir Fitzroy Anstruther-Gough-Calthorpe, 1st Baronet. Her mother, Vanessa Mary Theresa (née Hubbard), is the former wife of socialite Sir Dai Llewellyn, 4th Baronet. Vanessa is a former model who sat for David Bailey and John Swannell.

Through her maternal grandfather, Wilde's ancestors include Montagu Bertie, 6th Earl of Abingdon, General the Hon. Thomas Gage, and Stephanus Van Cortlandt, the first native-born Mayor of New York City. Wilde's maternal grandmother's parents were peers Bernard Fitzalan-Howard, 3rd Baron Howard of Glossop and Mona Fitzalan-Howard, 11th Baroness Beaumont.

Wilde has a younger sister, Octavia, as well as five half-siblings: Olivia and Arabella Llewellyn, from her mother's first marriage, and Georgiana, Isabella, and Jacobi, from her father's first marriage, to Lady Mary-Gaye Curzon. She is also "unofficial stepsisters" with Pandora Cooper-Key and Cressida Bonas, Lady Mary-Gaye's other daughters. Isabella, Olivia and Cressida are also actresses.

Wilde and her future husband were both educated at Windlesham House School. Afterwards she attended Heathfield St Mary's School, Ascot and St Swithun's School, Winchester, before leaving to pursue a course in art while continuing with her modelling career. She smuggled vodka into Heathfield, resulting in suspension and a transfer to St Swithun's. She studied fine art at the City and Guilds of London Art School but dropped out to pursue acting.

== Career ==
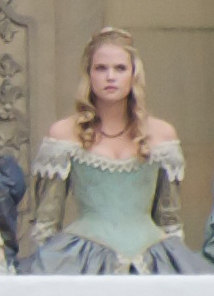
Wilde in 2010, filming a scene for The Three Musketeers.

Wilde began her career as a model. Spotted at age 14 by Naomi Campbell, she joined her agency Premier Model Management and appeared in campaigns for companies including L.K.Bennett, Lacoste, Abercrombie & Fitch, Burberry, Topshop and posed for InStyle, Cosmopolitan, Vogue and Nylon.

In 2007, she was named the second-most-eligible girl in Britain but rejected press attention and the "It girl" label.

In December 2009, Wilde made her acting debut in the adventure comedy film St Trinian's 2: The Legend of Fritton's Gold. In May 2010, Wilde appeared in an episode of the BBC television series Doctor Who as one of the eponymous vampires in "The Vampires of Venice".

In December 2010, Wilde was announced to have been cast in her film debut in the adventure film The Three Musketeers, an adaptation of the novel of the same name. Wilde portrayed the role of the queen's lady-in-waiting Constance Bonacieux. The film was released in October 2011 and went on to make over $132 million worldwide, but it was poorly received by critics, with a rating of 24% on Rotten Tomatoes based on reviews from 90 critics.

In March 2012, Wilde was cast in the ABC Sci-Fi television pilot Dark Horse. The series centers on a science student who learns that he is the chosen one, tasked with destroying the forces of evil. The pilot was not picked up by ABC for the 2012–2013 television season. That same year, Wilde starred in the short film Il Maestro and is attached to another film titled Squatters.

As well as Dark Horse, Wilde was cast in the 2013 remake Carrie. The film was directed by Boys Don't Cry director Kimberly Peirce and starred Chloë Grace Moretz and Julianne Moore. Filming began in June 2012 and it was released in October 2013.

In 2013, Wilde was cast in the second film adaptation of Scott Spencer's novel Endless Love, released 2014. She played Caroline Penvenen in the BBC drama Poldark from 2015 to 2019.

Wilde joined Estée Lauder as their newest spokesmodel in 2015, becoming the face of the brand's advertising campaigns.

== Personal life ==
Wilde married musician Alan Pownall on 13 September 2014, both previously having attended Windlesham House School. They have three sons.

== Filmography ==
=== Film ===
Year	Title	Role	Notes
2009	St Trinian's 2: The Legend of Fritton's Gold	Saffy	
2011	The Three Musketeers	Constance Bonacieux	
2013	Carrie	Sue Snell	
2014	Endless Love	Jade Butterfield	
2014	Squatters	Kelley	Direct-to-video film
2020	Wonder Woman 1984	Raquel	
2026	Mother's Pride	Abi	

Key
†	Denotes films that have not yet been released

=== Television ===
Year	Title	Role	Notes
2010	Doctor Who	Sister of the Water (Vampire Girl)	Episode: "The Vampires of Venice"
2012	Dark Horse	Wynter-Lee Cardigan	Unsold TV pilot
2016–2019	Poldark	Caroline Penvenen	Main role (series 2–5); Satellite Award for Best Cast – Television Series

== Ancestry ==
Ancestors of Gabriella Wilde

16. Robert Hamilton Lloyd-Anstruther
8. FitzRoy Hamilton Anstruther-Gough-Calthorpe, 1st Baronet
17. Gertrude Louisa Georgina FitzRoy (1850-1927), granddaughter of Lord William FitzRoy
4. Sir Richard Anstruther-Gough-Calthorpe, 2nd Bt. (1908-1985)
18. Augustus Gough-Calthorpe, 6th Baron Calthorpe
9. Hon. Rachel Gough-Calthorpe (1871-1951)
19. Maud Augusta Louisa Duncombe (1850-1925), daughter of Hon. Octavius Duncombe
2. John Anstruther-Gough-Calthorpe
20. George Forbes Malcolmson (1840-1923)
10. Vernon Austen Malcolmson (1872-1947)
21. Catherine Annesley Austen, descendant of Arthur Annesley, 1st Earl of Anglesey
5. Nancy Moireach Malcolmson (1912-1976)
22. Henry Strutt, 2nd Baron Belper
11. Hon. Lilian Strutt (1877-1956)
23. Lady Margaret Coke (1852-1922), daughter of Thomas Coke, 2nd Earl of Leicester
1. Gabriella Anstruther-Gough-Calthorpe
24. Thomas Hubbard (1809-1878)
12. Theodore Stephan Hubbard (d. 1934)
25. Emily Fanny Parish (1827-1892), daughter of Sir Woodbine Parish
6. Lt.-Cdr. Theodore Bernard Peregrine Hubbard (1923-)
26. Hon. Alberic Edward Bertie (1846-1928), son of Montagu Bertie, 6th Earl of Abingdon
13. Lavinia May Bertie (1887-1978)
27. Lady Caroline Elizabeth McDonnell (d. 1930), daughter of Mark McDonnell, 5th Earl of Antrim
3. Vanessa Teresa Hubbard (1958-)
28. Francis Edward Fitzalan-Howard, 2nd Baron Howard of Glossop (1859-1924), son of Edward Fitzalan-Howard, 1st Baron Howard of Glossop
14. Bernard Fitzalan-Howard, 3rd Baron Howard of Glossop
29. Clara Louisa Greenwood (1852-1887)
7. Lady Miriam Fitzalan-Howard (1924-1996)
30. Miles Stapleton, 10th Baron Beaumont
15. Mona Josephine Tempest Stapleton, 11th Baroness Beaumont
31. Ethel Mary Tempest (1864-1937)
