= Neill Cooper-Key =

British politician (1907–1981)

Portrait by Walter Bird, 1960

Sir Edmund McNeill Cooper-Key (26 April 1907 – 5 January 1981) was a British Conservative politician. He was member of parliament for Hastings from 1945 until his retirement in 1970.

The son of Captain Edmund Moore Cooper Cooper-Key, C.B., M.V.O., of Landford, Hampshire by his wife Florence (née Wigram), Cooper-Key was educated at the Royal Naval College, Osborne, and Dartmouth. He served in the Irish Guards during the Second World War, and alongside his later political career was a governor and committee member of the RNLI and director of Associated Newspapers Ltd, the Aberdeen Investment Trust, and Price Brothers Ltd. He was created a Knight Bachelor in 1960.

On 11 January 1941 he married Hon. Lorna Peggy Vyvyan Harmsworth (24 October 1920 – 18 June 2014), elder daughter of the 2nd Viscount Rothermere. They had two sons and two daughters; the second – but only surviving – son, (Kevin) Esmond Peter (1943–1985), married Lady Mary-Gaye Georgiana Lorna Curzon, third daughter of the 6th Earl Howe, whose daughter by her second husband, property magnate and scion of baronets John Anstruther-Gough-Calthorpe, is the actress Isabella Calthorpe.

He lived at Burnt Wood, Battle, East Sussex.

Parliament of the United Kingdom
Preceded by Maurice Hely-Hutchinson	Member of Parliament for Hastings; 1945–1970	Succeeded by Kenneth Warren
