= Ella Marchment =

British opera director

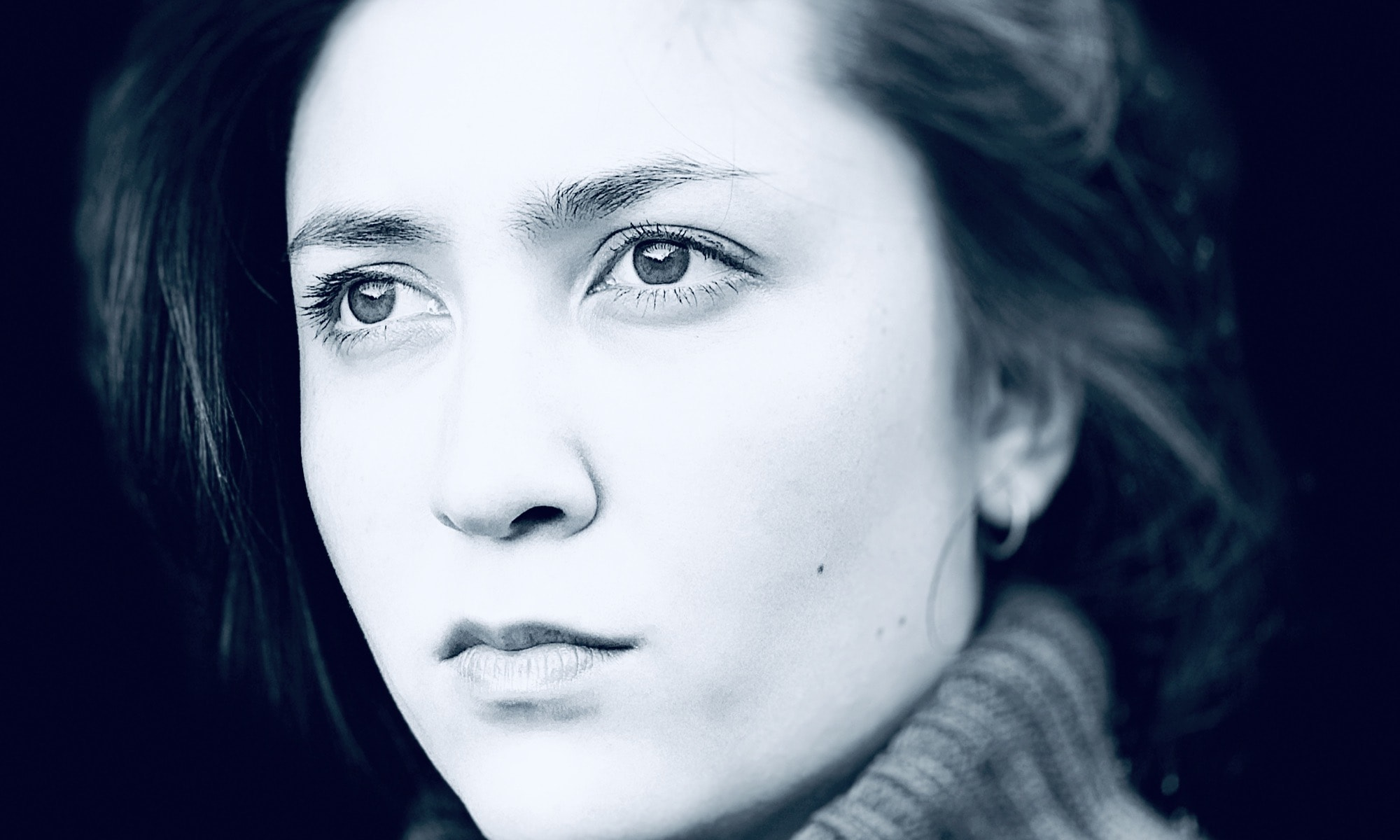
- Born: 30 May 1992 (age 33); Hampshire, England
- Education: King's College London; Royal Academy of Music; University of Bristol; Central Saint Martins; City Literary Institute; Bryanston School; Bedales School
- Occupations: Opera and theatre director
- Website: EllaMarchment.org

Ella Marchment (born 30 May 1992) is a British opera director, artistic director, and an associate professor. She is a co-founder of the campaign charity SWAP'ra, Supporting Women and Parents in Opera, and the artistic director of Opera Festival of Chicago, and Opera in the Rock, Arkansas. She previously founded the opera company Helios Collective. She has directed the International Opera Awards since 2017.

== Career ==
In 2015 Marchment co-founded Theatre N16 in London.

She also created Toi Toi, a festival series of operatic club nights held at the CLF Art Cafe in Peckham, London; and Formations Masterclasses, a series of workshops that commissioned and staged new operas, with sessions led by figures from the opera world including Janis Kelly, Judith Weir, Mark Wigglesworth, Kasper Holten, Daniel Kramer, Robert Saxton, Stephen Unwin, Stephen Barlow, Stephen Medcalf, David Pountney, and David Parry. Formations Masterclasses were hosted by English National Opera and King's College London.

She was artistic resident at Banff Centre for Arts and Creativity and Dutch National Opera.

In addition to directing engagements in Europe and the US, Marchment is artistic director of the Opera Festival of Chicago and Opera in the Rock in Arkansas. Creative Associate and co-founder of SWAP’ra, She was previously Director of Opera at Northern Illinois University, and is now Director of Opera and Associate Professor at Shenandoah Conservatory.

Marchment is a co-founder of SWAP’ra, an opera-based charity that works to address the under-representation of women in senior leadership roles in opera.

== Awards and recognition ==
In 2015 Marchment became the first opera director to be awarded a bursary by the International Opera Awards.

In 2018 and 2022 she was a semi-finalist in the European Opera-Directing Prize, and in 2018 she was shortlisted for the Women of the Future Awards in the arts and culture category.

== Works ==
=== Opera ===
- Double-bill tour of Façade, by Sir William Walton and Dame Edith Sitwell, and Eight Songs for a Mad King, by Sir Peter Maxwell Davies, (2014)
- Play-opera adaptation of Die Meistersinger von Nürnberg, by Richard Wagner, adapted for the stage by Ella Marchment, (2015)
- Dido & …, a reimagined reading of Henry Purcell's Dido & Aeneas as Dido & Belinda, (2016)
- A play-opera co-production of Hathaway – Eight Arias For A Bardic Life by Briar Kit Esme, (2016), jointly commissioned and staged by Helios Collective, Buxton Festival, and Copenhagen Opera Festival to mark the 400th anniversary of William Shakespeare’s death. In the work, Anne Hathaway is portrayed as being ‘far more than the wife of William Shakespeare’
- Salon Russe, a Helios Collective and Bury Court Opera co-production, held at the National Portrait Gallery, London, that commissioned and premiered four new operatic works, (2016).
- Assistant directorships at Buxton Festival with directors Stephen Unwin, Stephen Medcalf, and Harry Silverstei, and at Wexford Festival Opera and Deutsches Symphonie-Orchester Berlin with actor and director Fiona Shaw.
- Associate Director and Assistant Director to Mary Birnbaum on the Juilliard Opera (New York) production of Dido and Aeneas, touring to the Meredith Willson Theater in New York, Opera Holland Park in London, and The Royal Opera of Versailles in France.
- Director of Bury Court Opera’s final ever production, The Turn of the Screw, by Benjamin Britten.
- Director of the International Opera Awards at London Coliseum in 2017 and 2018 and at Sadler's Wells Theatre in 2019.
- In 2020 Marchment founded an international co-operative called Opera Harmony. More than one hundred artists wrote, staged, performed, and filmed twenty new compositions during the COVID-19 lockdowns of 2020, working in isolation in different countries and different time zones around the world. The operas were broadcast in the summer of 2020 by OperaVision, a free-to-view streaming platform that is supported by the European Union's Creative Europe programme.

=== Opera premieres ===
- US premiere of 4 Opéras de poche, by Germaine Tailleferre, in 2022.
- UK premiere of Little Women, by Mark Adamo, at Opera Holland Park in July 2022.
- World premiere a new work by the composer and flautist Brent Michael Davids at the Venice Biennale in September 2022.

=== Stage work ===
She has directed the following stage works:

- Private Peaceful (Theatre N16, 2015) adapted by Simon Reade, based on the novel by Michael Morpurgo, starring Shana Swash
- An Evening with Lucian Freud (Wonderful Artful Theatre at Leicester Square Theatre, 2015) by Laura-Jane Foley, starring Cressida Bonas, Alastair Stewart, Russell Grant, Benjamin Ramm, and Maureen Lipman
- Robbie’s Date (The Courtyard Theatre, 2015) by Michelle Douglass
- King Roger (Random Acts, Channel 4, 2016) by Karol Szymanowski
