= Richard Dinan =

British businessman and author (born 1986)

- Born: Richard Assheton Dermot Dinan; 1986 (age 39–40); England
- Education: St Edward's School, Oxford
- Occupations: Businessman, author, former reality television personality
- Years active: 2012–present
- Known for: Made in Chelsea and Pulsar Fusion
- Notable work: The Fusion Age: Modern Nuclear Fusion Reactors (2017)
- Television: Made in Chelsea
- Title: Chief Executive Officer of Pulsar Fusion
- Parent(s): Lady Charlotte Curzon; Captain John "Barry" Dinan
- Relatives: Cressida Bonas (cousin); Edward Curzon, 6th Earl Howe (grandfather)

Richard Assheton Dermot Dinan (born 1986) is a British businessman, author and former reality television personality. He first gained public attention as a cast member of the E4 reality series Made in Chelsea. Dinan later founded Pulsar Fusion, a company involved in developing nuclear fusion‑based propulsion technology. He is also the author of a popular science book on nuclear fusion.

== Early life and education ==
Dinan was born in 1986 in England to Lady Charlotte Curzon and Captain John "Barry" Dinan. Through his mother, he is the grandson of Edward Curzon, 6th Earl Howe and a descendant of Francis Curzon, 5th Earl Howe, who won the 1931 Le Mans race. He is also the first cousin of Cressida Bonas.

Dinan grew up in Penn, Buckinghamshire, and attended St Edward's School, Oxford, which he left after completing his GCSEs at age 16 years. He trained briefly as a gunsmith with Holland & Holland before founding Ammunition, a short‑lived youth‑culture magazine.

== Career ==
In March 2012 Dinan joined the cast of the structured‑reality TV series Made in Chelsea, appearing as a supporting cast member from series 3 to 5 (2012–2013), with a brief return in series 10 (2015). The series featured his development of a high‑tech wearable called the "Senturion".

Dinan also founded Applied Fusion Systems (later renamed Pulsar Fusion) to develop compact fusion reactors for energy and spacecraft propulsion. In 2017, Pulsar Fusion began work on a Spherical tokamak reactor inspired by research at the Culham Centre for Fusion Energy.

In 2017 Dinan authored The Fusion Age: Modern Nuclear Fusion Reactors. In the same year, he was among the patrons at a Christie's art auction benefiting the Prince's Foundation "Children & the Arts," which provides arts‑engagement programs for disadvantaged youth.

Dinan serves as the chief executive officer of Pulsar Fusion. During his tenure, Pulsar Fusion developed and successfully tested nitrous oxide and polyethylene‑based rocket engines in 2021 at a Ministry of Defence site in Salisbury. In 2023, Pulsar Fusion introduced a fusion‑powered rocket concept called Sunbird.

== Bibliography ==
- Dinan, R. (2017). The Fusion Age: Modern Nuclear Fusion Reactors. Bletchley, UK: Applied Fusion Systems.
