= Olivia Llewellyn =

English actress (born 1980)

- Born: 1980 (age 45–46); England
- Education: London Academy of Music and Dramatic Art
- Occupation: Actress
- Years active: 2005–present
- Parents: Dai Llewellyn (father); Vanessa Hubbard (mother)
- Relatives: Gabriella Wilde (maternal half-sister)
- Website: Olivia Llewellyn

Olivia Anna Cristina Llewellyn (born 1980) is an English actress, best known for her television appearances portraying Isabel Danforth in The Lizzie Borden Chronicles and Mina Harker in Penny Dreadful.

== Career ==
Trained at the London Academy of Music and Dramatic Art, Llewellyn appeared in supporting roles in several television series and films before portraying Mina Harker in the Showtime series Penny Dreadful in 2014 and 2015, and Isabel Danforth in the Lifetime series The Lizzie Borden Chronicles in 2015.

Llewellyn has appeared onstage as Flaminia in Timon of Athens with the Royal National Theatre, as Luciana in The Comedy of Errors with the Royal Shakespeare Company and as Cecile De Volanges Les Liaisons dangereuses at the Playhouse Theatre in the West End.

== Filmography ==
Year	Project	Role	Notes	Ref.
2005	Beethoven	Josephine Deym	TV miniseries	
2008	Midsomer Murders	Helen	TV series/Episode: "Blood Wedding"	
2009	The Boat That Rocked (aka Pirate Radio)	Margaret	Film	
2009	Kingdom	Moonbeam	TV series/Episode 3.6	
2011	Dimensions	Annie	Film	
2011	Enchantress (aka The Death of Merlin)	Viviane	Film	
2013	Doctors	Renata Wicker	TV soap opera/Episode: "Mother's Choice"	
2013	Lucan	Kiki	TV movie	
2014, 2015	Penny Dreadful	Mina Harker	TV series/10 episodes	
2015	The Musketeers	Lucie De Foix	TV series/Episode: "Keep Your Friends Close"	
2015	Call the Midwife	Colette Wimbish	TV series/Episode 4.1	
2015	The Lizzie Borden Chronicles	Isabel Danforth	TV series/5 episodes	
2016	Casualty	Verity Barratt	TV series/Episode: "Survivors"	

== Personal life ==
Born in 1980, Llewellyn is the daughter of Sir David St Vincent "Dai" Llewellyn, 4th Baronet and Vanessa Mary Teresa Hubbard. She has a younger sister, Arabella Dominica (born 1983). Llewellyn also has several half- and step-siblings, including actresses Gabriella Wilde and Isabella Calthorpe.
