= Doomcoming =

- Yellowjackets episode
- Episode no.: Season 1 Episode 9
- Directed by: Daisy von Scherler Mayer
- Written by: Ameni Rozsa; Sarah L. Thompson
- Cinematography by: Trevor Forrest
- Editing by: Kevin D. Ross
- Original release date: January 9, 2022
- Running time: 59 minutes

Guest appearances
- Courtney Eaton as Teen Lottie; Liv Hewson as Teen Van; Keeya King as Akilah; Jane Widdop as Laura Lee; Peter Gadiot as Adam Martin; Kevin Alves as Teen Travis; Alexa Barajas as Mari; Rekha Sharma as Jessica Roberts; Jack DePew as Teen Jeff; Pearl Amanda Dickson as Allie Stevens

Episode chronology
← Previous "Flight of the Bumblebee"	Next → "Sic Transit Gloria Mundi"

"Doomcoming" is the ninth episode of the American thriller drama television series Yellowjackets. The episode was written by co-executive producers Ameni Rozsa and Sarah L. Thompson, and directed by Daisy von Scherler Mayer. It originally aired on Showtime on January 9, 2022.

The series follows a New Jersey high school girls' soccer team that travels to Seattle for a national tournament in 1996. While flying over Canada, their plane crashes deep in the wilderness, and the surviving team members are left stranded for nineteen months. The series chronicles their attempts to stay alive as some of the team members are driven to cannibalism. It also focuses on the lives of the survivors 25 years later in 2021, as the events of their ordeal continue to affect them many years after their rescue. In the episode, Shauna confronts Adam for his lies, ending with severe consequences. Flashbacks depict the girls deciding to do a "Doomcoming" party, but chaos ensues when they accidentally ingest hallucinogenic mushrooms.

According to Nielsen Media Research, the episode was seen by an estimated 0.419 million household viewers and gained a 0.08 ratings share among adults aged 18–49. The episode received critical acclaim, who praised the performances, flashbacks, tone, character development and pacing. For the episode, Melanie Lynskey received a nomination for Outstanding Lead Actress in a Drama Series at the 74th Primetime Emmy Awards.

== Plot ==
=== 1996 ===
The group has grown pessimistic since Laura Lee's death, especially with winter arriving very soon. Mari (Alexa Barajas) finds a jar of rotten berries, planning to use them as a drink. As everyone had dresses for their award presentation, they decide to do a homecoming party, dubbed "Doomcoming".

Jackie (Ella Purnell) decides to use the event to finally ask Travis (Kevin Alves) to sleep with her, starting by dancing together. Annoyed by this, Natalie (Sophie Thatcher) convinces Ben (Steven Krueger) to accompany her away from the group to drink alcohol. During this, the girls eat mushrooms, unaware that they are Misty's (Sammi Hanratty) hallucinogenic mushrooms that were accidentally put in a stew. Jackie and Travis go to the cabin, where Jackie reveals that she knew that Shauna (Sophie Nélisse) had sex with Jeff, prompting her to conclude that no relationships matter. They end up having sex.

Per Ben's suggestion, Natalie leaves to reconcile with Travis. Suddenly, Misty surprises Ben and declares her love for him. Ben finally comes out as gay, shocking Misty. The girls become aggressive as they begin searching for Travis, howling like wolves and abandoning Javi. They reach the cabin, locking Jackie in the closet and chasing Travis through the forest. They capture him and tie him to a tree, with Lottie (Courtney Eaton) asking Shauna to slit his throat. As she places the knife, Natalie arrives and takes the knife. She releases Travis and scolds the girls for their actions.

=== 2021 ===
Shauna (Melanie Lynskey) confronts Adam (Peter Gadiot) over his lies. She accuses him of blackmailing her, but Adam claims he did not do it. As she inspects his apartment, she is shocked to find a magazine detailing the plane crash. Adam reiterates he was just curious about her background, but Shauna pulls out a knife. As Adam tries to calm her down, Shauna stabs him. Adam collapses dead to the floor.

Shauna confronts Jeff (Warren Kole) over the glitter, as he was the only person that could know the code to her safe. Jeff finally admits that he was the blackmailer, as his furniture store was going out of business. He admits he got involved with loan sharks to help him, but he states that it is over. Shauna then admits to killing Adam, and admits to following Jeff to the hotel and finding him with Bianca. Jeff reveals that Bianca is one of the loan sharks, but is disappointed when he realizes Shauna was having an affair with Adam. Nevertheless, he offers to take the blame for Shauna, but she reminds him that the police will still find out. Jeff reveals he read her journals detailing her actions in the wilderness, and despite its content, he is still staying with her.

Later, Shauna takes Natalie (Juliette Lewis) and Taissa (Tawny Cypress) to the apartment to see Adam's corpse, claiming he was the blackmailer. Natalie is upset that they will not get answers to Travis' murder, but agrees to help Shauna in disposing of the body with her contacts. Misty (Christina Ricci) prepares for her high school reunion, conversing with Jessica (Rekha Sharma) over a possible representation. Natalie visits Misty, apologizing for her previous treatment of her. She also asks her to dispose of a body, which Misty agrees to do.

== Development ==
=== Production ===
The episode was written by co-executive producers Ameni Rozsa and Sarah L. Thompson, and directed by Daisy von Scherler Mayer. This marked Rozsa's second writing credit, Thompson's second writing credit, and von Scherler Mayer's first directing credit. The episode was originally titled "Heavenly Creatures".

The orgy scene was organized with intimacy coordinator Katherine Kadler. Courtney Eaton described it as an "uncomfortable scene to shoot" due to its depiction of sexual assault.

== Reception ==
=== Viewers ===
The episode was watched by 0.419 million viewers, earning a 0.08 in the 18-49 rating demographics on the Nielsen ratings scale. This means that 0.08 percent of all households with televisions watched the episode. This was a 34% increase in viewership from the previous episode, which was watched by 0.311 million viewers, earning a 0.06 in the 18-49 rating demographics.

=== Critical reviews ===
"Doomcoming" received critical acclaim. Leila Latif of The A.V. Club gave the episode an "A–" and wrote, "the moment we've all been waiting for finally arrives. Lottie puts on the veil and antlers! She encourages Shauna to slit Travis's throat, whispering “It's ok, it wants us to.” Shauna begins to slice through flesh when Nat bursts in to save him at the moment. Thrilling stuff and thankfully, we know this won't be the last time Lottie leads them in a hunt."

Kelly McClure of Vulture gave the episode a perfect 5 star rating out of 5 and wrote, "We now know who was behind the blackmailing, but we still don't know who was behind the postcards and Travis's death. If Natalie was right about something, and it's the key to solving this mystery, it's locked somewhere deep within her. God help everyone around her when she finally pulls it out." Cade Taylor of Telltale TV gave the episode a 4.5 star rating out of 5 and wrote, "Yellowjackets Season 1 Episode 9, “Doomcoming,” is an exhilarating penultimate episode that showcases the yellowjackets’ descent to madness and the notion of true love. “Doomcoming” does exceedingly well to answer what burning questions it can before the finale, “Sic Transit Gloria Mundi,” and set up the next conflict."

Brittney Bender of Bleeding Cool gave the episode a perfect 10 out of 10 rating and wrote, "Showtime's Yellowjackets produced a fantastic episode full of memorable moments of survival-level rage from the characters all while moving character development along at a perfect pace. A mix of mind-tripping visuals and phenomenal acting, this Showtime series is heading towards the season finale in the way it should be." Greg Wheeler of The Review Geek gave the episode a 4 star rating out of 5 and wrote, "Yellowjackets continues to deliver the goods, with an enthralling chapter that sets the scene beautifully for next week's finale."

=== Accolades ===
Melanie Lynskey submitted the episode to support her nomination for Outstanding Lead Actress in a Drama Series at the 74th Primetime Emmy Awards. She would lose to Zendaya for Euphoria.
