= Sarah Tyler =

Sarah Tyler may refer to:

- Sarah Tyler (singer) who worked with Fred Falke
- Sarah Tyler, character in 13Hrs
- Srah Tyler, ship on The Truth About Spring
