= Laura-Jane Foley =

British playwright and art historian

- Born: London, England
- Education: Homerton College, Cambridge; Trinity College, Oxford (MSt); Kingston University (PhD)
- Occupations: Playwright, art historian, journalist
- Children: 1

Laura-Jane Foley is a British playwright and art historian. Her play An Evening with Lucian Freud played at the Leicester Square Theatre in 2015. She is a former lecturer at the University of Cambridge in History of Art and Creative Writing.

== Education and early career ==
Foley read History of Art at Homerton College, Cambridge, where she was awarded the Westall Prize. She also edited Varsity, the university newspaper. Foley was a choral scholar and appeared on the television programme Faking It during her second year, where she was transformed from choir girl to rock chick. She then undertook an MSt in History of Art at Trinity College, Oxford. She was awarded her PhD by Kingston University for a thesis entitled "Lucian Freud Portraits: Curatorial Ekphrasis in Contemporary British Poetic Practice".

== Writing and academic career ==
Foley has lectured at Bristol University and Kingston University. She currently lectures in History of Art and Creative Writing at Cambridge University.

As a journalist, Foley has written for The Independent, TES, The Art Newspaper and The Liberal. From 2008 to 2010, she edited Politick! a political magazine for people aged 18 to 35.

In 2009, Foley curated and edited The Butterfly Book, a charity art book which included contributions from Tony Blair, Kate Winslet, Grayson Perry, and others, in aid of leukaemia research. She also contributed to Cambridge University – An 800th Anniversary Portrait (2009), The Old Parsonage (2010), Poetry from Art (2011), and The Echoing Gallery (2013).

In 2015, Foley's play An Evening with Lucian Freud appeared at the Leicester Square Theatre in the West End. The one woman play with video cameos starred Cressida Bonas, Alastair Stewart and Maureen Lipman. The play was based on Foley's own experience with Lucian Freud after she rejected an offer to become his muse. Directed by Ella Marchment, the play received national and international press attention.

In 2016, Foley collaborated with composer Stephen Barlow for a new opera composition, called 'She sings it differently'. It premiered at the National Portrait Gallery on 24 June 2016.

Foley mounted the exhibition 'The Shakespeareans' at The Ivy in August 2016. It featured Joss Ackland and Jonathan Pryce.

In 2016 Foley was shortlisted for an Aviva Women of the Future Award in the Arts and Culture category.

In 2018 Foley released her album 'Songs for My Daughter' with proceeds going to the Lullaby Trust.

Foley hosts a podcast entitled 'My Favourite Work of Art'.

== Personal life ==
Foley has a daughter with lyricist Tim Rice born in October 2016.

== Selected works ==
=== Theatre ===
- Words of Love – P.S I Love You (Poem/Installation), Bradford Playhouse
- A Far Better Thing (Libretto), ROH workshop, Jerwood Space
- An Evening with Lucian Freud (Play), Leicester Square Theatre

=== Books ===
- The Butterfly Book (Art book) (2009)
- Cambridge University – An 800th Anniversary Portrait (Article) (2009)
- The Old Parsonage (Novella) (2010)
- Poetry from Art (Poem) (2011)
- The Echoing Gallery (Poem) (2013)
- An Evening with Lucian Freud (Playtext) (2015)
