= An Evening with Lucian Freud =

2015 one-woman play

- Written by: Laura-Jane Foley
- Genre: Drama

Premiere
- Date premiered: 19 May 2015
- Place premiered: Leicester Square Theatre

An Evening with Lucian Freud is a 2015 play written by Laura-Jane Foley. It is a one-woman show with video cameos based on a real life encounter the playwright had with the artist Lucian Freud. The play made its world premiere on 19 May 2015 at the West End's Leicester Square Theatre where it ran until 6 June 2015.

== Synopsis ==
The play is based on a real life encounter the playwright Laura-Jane Foley had with the artist Lucian Freud. In the 65-minute one-act play with video cameos, the character Laura recounts the evening she spent with the 82-year-old artist. The narrative is broken up with five video cameos from characters including Dora Maar and Leigh Bowery.

== Original West End production ==
Casting for the play took place in April 2015, and was formally announced on Twitter on 22 April. Cressida Bonas was cast as Laura. The play also featured video cameo appearances from Maureen Lipman, Alastair Stewart, Laura-Jane Foley, Russell Grant, Shana Swash and Benjamin Ramm. The play was produced by Wonderful Artful Theatre and was directed by Ella Marchment and designed by Lily German. The Evening Standard announced that filming for the video cameos took place on 11 May. The play ran at the Leicester Square Theatre. The opening night was 19 May and the play ended on 6 June.

== Press attention ==
Prior to Press Night there had been a lot of press interest due to the casting of Cressida Bonas in her first major theatrical role. Details of the play were not released prior to the opening and due to the libidinous reputation of the eponymous Lucian Freud, there was much speculation in the press about the nature of the production. The Evening Standard wrongly stated that the play "features explicit sex scenes". The play and Bonas's portrayal of the playwright were widely termed 'fascinating' and 'charming'. Jane Shilling in The Daily Telegraph praised the "charm and energy of Bonas’s performance'.

== Principal roles and original cast ==
Character	Original West End performer
Laura	Cressida Bonas
Dora Maar	Maureen Lipman
Leigh Bowery	Russell Grant
Model 1	Laura-Jane Foley
Model 2	Shana Swash
Presenter	Alastair Stewart
Lucian Freud	Benjamin Ramm
