= The Strange Colour of Your Body's Tears =

2013 film by Hélène Cattet and Bruno Forzani

- Theatrical release poster
- French: L'étrange couleur des larmes de ton corps
- Directed by: Hélène Cattet; Bruno Forzani
- Written by: Hélène Cattet; Bruno Forzani
- Starring: Klaus Tange; Ursula Bedena; Joe Koener
- Cinematography: Manuel Dacosse
- Edited by: Bernard Beets
- Production companies: Anonymes Films; Tobina Film; Epidemic; Red Lion
- Distributed by: Shellac (France); Numéro Zéro (Belgium)
- Release dates: 12 August 2013 (Locarno); 12 March 2014 (Belgium, France & Luxembourg)
- Running time: 102 minutes
- Countries: Belgium; France; Luxembourg
- Languages: French; Danish; Flemish
- Box office: $7,182

The Strange Colour of Your Body's Tears (French: L'étrange couleur des larmes de ton corps) is a 2013 experimental giallo film written and directed by Hélène Cattet and Bruno Forzani. It stars Klaus Tange as a man seeking the whereabouts of his missing wife, only to become entangled in a complicated web of lies and murder.

The film, an international co-production between Belgium, France and Luxembourg, had its world premiere at the Locarno Film Festival in Switzerland on 12 August 2013. It was released theatrically on 12 March 2014 in Belgium, France and Luxembourg. In the United States, it was given a limited theatrical release on 29 August 2014 by Strand Releasing.

== Plot ==
Dan (Klaus Tange) is an average businessman that has returned home to find that his wife has gone missing. He decides to go from apartment to apartment to see if he can find her, but is unsuccessful in finding his wife. Dan does, however, encounter several people that tell him their own stories and secrets.

== Cast ==
- Klaus Tange as Dan Kristensen
- Anna D'Annunzio as Barbara
- Jean-Michel Vovk as the inspector
- Sam Louwyck
- Ursula Bedena
- Joe Koener
- Birgit Yew
- Hans De Munter
- Manon Beuchot
- Romain Roll
- Lolita Oosterlynck

== Production ==
Produced by Belgian producer Eve Commenge (Anonymes Films), in co-production with French producer François Cognard (Tobina Film).

The production shot for 44 days between Brussels and Nancy. A few scenes were shot in a studio in Luxembourg.

== Reception ==
Critical reception for The Strange Colour of Your Body's Tears was mixed. On the review aggregator website Rotten Tomatoes, the film holds an approval rating of 51% based on 47 reviews, with an average score of 5.7/10. The website's critics consensus reads, "Bursting with visual style but suffering from a dearth of discernible narrative, The Strange Color of Your Tears is recommended only for giallo enthusiasts." Metacritic, which uses a weighted average, assigned the film a score of 53 out of 100, based on 17 reviews, indicating "mixed or average reviews". It received four nominations at the 5th Magritte Awards exclusively in technical categories, winning Best Cinematography.
