= Tulip Fever =

2017 film by Justin Chadwick

- Theatrical release poster
- Directed by: Justin Chadwick
- Screenplay by: Deborah Moggach; Tom Stoppard
- Based on: Tulip Fever by Deborah Moggach
- Produced by: Alison Owen; Harvey Weinstein
- Starring: Alicia Vikander; Dane DeHaan; Jack O'Connell; Holliday Grainger; Tom Hollander; Matthew Morrison; Kevin McKidd; Douglas Hodge; Joanna Scanlan; Zach Galifianakis; Judi Dench; Christoph Waltz
- Cinematography: Eigil Bryld
- Edited by: Rick Russell
- Music by: Danny Elfman
- Production companies: Worldview Entertainment; Paramount Pictures (Note: Paramount, which initially acquired rights to the film, were only given a studio credit in the final film.); Ruby Films
- Distributed by: The Weinstein Company (United States); Entertainment Film Distributors (United Kingdom)
- Release dates: August 13, 2017 (Soho House); September 1, 2017 (United States)
- Running time: 107 minutes
- Countries: United States; United Kingdom
- Language: English
- Budget: $25 million
- Box office: $9.2 million

Tulip Fever is a 2017 historical romantic drama film directed by Justin Chadwick and written by Deborah Moggach and Tom Stoppard, adapted from Moggach's 1999 novel of the same name. It stars an ensemble cast featuring Alicia Vikander, Dane DeHaan, Jack O'Connell, Holliday Grainger, Tom Hollander, Matthew Morrison, Kevin McKidd, Douglas Hodge, Joanna Scanlan, Zach Galifianakis, Judi Dench, and Christoph Waltz. The plot follows a 17th-century "Tulip mania" painter in Amsterdam who falls in love with a married woman whose portrait he has been commissioned to paint.

Filmed in the summer of 2014, Tulip Fever was delayed numerous times before finally being released in the United States on 1 September 2017. It received generally unfavourable reviews from critics and grossed $9 million worldwide against its $25 million budget. This was also the last film to be theatrically released by The Weinstein Company, which filed for bankruptcy following a series of sexual assault cases against co-founder Harvey Weinstein.

== Plot ==
The orphan Sophia is cared for in the convent of St. Ursula in the Dutch Republic just before the 17th century tulip mania. A marriage proposal from the far-older wealthy spice merchant Cornelis Sandvoort enables her to leave, with the generous dowry allowing her sisters to emigrate to New Amsterdam, where they have an aunt awaiting them, their only surviving relative.

Three years later, Sophia is unhappy in the marriage, since Cornelis seems to be concerned only with conceiving an heir. They ritualistically pray and then lie together nightly but Sophia still has not been blessed with child. Sophia's dressmaker, Mrs. Overvalt, recommends Dr. Sorgh, who is a secret consort and Sophia is appalled. Cornelis believes this continued misfortune is directly related to a mistake he made in the past with his previous wife. She miscarried their first child and was in distress with the second childbirth. Cornelis asked the doctor to save the child over his wife, and thus he feels that God punished him by taking both his wife and his child.

Cornelis, the “King of Peppercorns”, commissions a young painter for a vain double portrait so that he may be remembered as having a beautiful young wife, should he have no heir to continue his legacy. Sophia consents, but as soon as the artist, Jan Van Loos, arrives to stage and paint the couple, he and Sophia have tension-laced chemistry. In an impulsive reaction, Sophia asks Cornelis to cancel the portrait or commission a different painter and later changes her mind. During their next session, Jan and Sophia are both deeply lovestruck and Jan writes a note to Sophia, asking her to send him a vase of tulips. With Cornelis’ permission, she shows up at his door with the tulips, and they consummate their love affair.

Meanwhile, Sophia's housemaid and friend, Maria, is in a courtship with the neighborhood fishmonger, Willem. Willem is exploring the informal and dynamic tulip market as it plays out in local taverns. He aims to find a way to be independently prosperous, to marry Maria, and build a family together. He sells his business to another fishmonger and engages in business with the Abbess of St. Ursula. Sophia borrows Maria's cloak to secretly rendezvous with Jan. Willem mistakes her for Maria, and follows her to her rendezvous. Crushed by what he thinks is Maria's infidelity, he goes straight to the tavern to drown his sorrows. Completely inebriated, a prostitute robs him of his modest tulip fortune. By the time he realizes and tries to chase after her, he is beaten by her brother and a mob of his friends and forcibly conscripted into the Dutch Navy. When Maria hears the news, she is devastated— especially because she is now pregnant out of wedlock. In confiding with Sophia, Maria threatens to disclose the affair to Cornelis so that she won't be cast out of the house.

Sophia acts fast and tells Cornelis that she is pregnant and he is overjoyed. Sophia conspires with Maria to pass off the pregnancy as her own. When the baby is born, Sophia will pretend to die in childbirth so she can be with Jan, and Maria can raise the child as her own with Cornelis. She enlists the help of Dr. Sorgh to further deceive Cornelis about the pregnancy and he predicts a boy.

Jan plans their escape to the New World with Sophia, intending to take part in the escalating tulip market. Knowing that the nuns at St. Ursula raise tulips in their gardens, Jan attempts to steal some but is deftly knocked out by the ever-vigilant Abbess of St. Ursula. When he regains consciousness, he apologizes and the Abbess gives him the bulbs Willem had bought before he was abducted into the navy.

After Maria gives birth to a daughter and Sophia pretends to die, Cornelis is grief-stricken at the loss of his wife. Sophia, under her shroud, weeps as she realizes that she has deeply hurt Cornelis with her deceit, but eventually realizes that it is too late to undo what she has done. Ashamed of herself, Sophia runs away and Jan is unable to find her.

Willem, returning after his stint in the navy in Africa, visits Maria at Cornelis's house. Maria is furious at him, but they soon reconcile once he discovers he was not betrayed. Cornelis overhears their loud quarreling and the revelation of the conspiracy among Maria, Sophia, and Jan. Cornelis makes his peace with the truth, and departs for the Dutch East Indies, where he finds love and makes a family, but only after leaving the house to Maria, Willem, and the baby girl that he loved as his own.

Eight years later, the abbess of St. Ursula visits Jan and views his artwork of Sophia. She praises him for his talent, and commissions him to paint a mural in the church. When Jan looks down from the scaffold, he sees Sophia, who has joined the convent, and they share tender smiles.

== Cast ==
- Dane DeHaan as Jan van Loos, a painter
- Alicia Vikander as Sophia Sandvoort, wife to a wealthy merchant
- Christoph Waltz as Cornelis Sandvoort, a wealthy spice merchant
- Jack O'Connell as Willem Brok, a fishmonger
- Holliday Grainger as Maria, the Sandvoorts’ maid
- Judi Dench as the Abbess of St. Ursula
- Zach Galifianakis as Gerrit, assistant to Jan
- Matthew Morrison as Mattheus, a friend and associate of Jan
- Cara Delevingne as Annetje, a tulip trader and petty thief
- Joanna Scanlan as Mrs. Overvalt, a dressmaker
- Tom Hollander as Dr. Sorgh, a physician
- Cressida Bonas as Mrs. Steen, an old friend of Cornelis and Sophia
- Kevin McKidd as Johan de Bye, a tulip trader
- David Harewood as Mr. Prater, a representative of St. Ursula's Convent

== Production ==
The film was originally planned to be made in 2004 on a $48 million budget, with Jude Law, Keira Knightley and Jim Broadbent as lead actors, John Madden as director and Steven Spielberg producing through DreamWorks. However, the production was halted days before it was scheduled to start filming as a result of changes in tax rules affecting film production in the UK.

In 2014, Alison Owen partnered with Weinstein to restart the film after re-acquiring the rights to the film from Paramount Pictures. In October 2013, Dane DeHaan was in talks to join the cast. In February 2014, Christoph Waltz joined the cast. In April 2014, Holliday Grainger, Cara Delevingne, and Jack O'Connell joined the cast. According to Cara Delevingne, the real reason for her casting was that producer Harvey Weinstein sexually harassed her, attempted to kiss her without consent, and propositioned her for a threesome in a hotel room in exchange for a role. Despite declining, she was still cast in the film, but said that she regretted it, as his actions terrified her. In June 2014, Judi Dench was cast as the abbess of St. Ursula, who takes in orphaned children. That same month Tom Hollander, Cressida Bonas, and David Harewood joined the cast. In August 2014, Matthew Morrison joined the cast. Deborah Moggach, author of the novel, also appears in the film. Harvey Weinstein offered Harry Styles the role of Mattheus, but the singer turned it down due to scheduling conflicts, and Matthew Morrison was cast instead.

The crew of Tulip Fever included cinematographer Eigil Bryld, production designer Simon Elliott, costume designer Michael O’Connor, hair and make-up designer Daniel Phillips and editor Rick Russell. Tom Stoppard adapted the screenplay for the film. The London-based Welsh portrait artist Jamie Routley did the original portraits that are seen in the film. Danny Elfman composed the film's score.

Filming took place at Cobham Hall in Gravesend, Kent, where the production transformed a wing at the school into a 17th-century Amsterdam Gracht. The waterway was also constructed from scratch, complete with barges and donkeys crossing humpback bridges. Additionally, the school's courtyard was used as the brewery yard in the story. Other filming locations include Norwich Cathedral, Holkham (in Norfolk), Tilbury (in Essex), Kentwell Hall (in Suffolk), and at Pinewood Studios on various dates throughout June and July in 2014. Filming also took place in Haddenham, Buckinghamshire.

== Release ==
Footage from the film was screened in May 2015 at the 68th Cannes Film Festival. In December 2015, the first image of the film featuring Alicia Vikander and Christoph Waltz was released. The film was originally scheduled to be released in November 2015, but was pushed back to 15 July 2016 and then delayed again until 24 February 2017. It was then pulled from the schedule, and later moved to 25 August 2017. On 16 August 2017, the film was again delayed, this time being pushed back a week to 1 September. The film premiered on 13 August 2017, at London's Soho House.

== Reception ==
=== Box office ===
Tulip Fever grossed $2.4 million in the United States and Canada and $6.7 million in other territories for a total of $9.2 million, against a production budget of $25 million.

In North America, Tulip Fever was projected to gross $1–2 million from 765 theatres in its opening weekend. It ended up debuting to $1.2 million ($1.5 million over the four-day Labor Day weekend) in what was the worst combined holiday weekend since 1998. Despite adding seven theaters in its second weekend, the film dropped 75.4% to $285,300, the 37th biggest such drop in history.

=== Critical response ===
On review aggregator Rotten Tomatoes, the film has an approval rating of 10% based on 60 reviews, with an average rating of 4.4/10. The site's critical consensus reads: "Tulip Fever is a lush, handsomely-mounted period piece undone by uninspired dialogue and excessive plotting." On Metacritic, which assigns a normalised average rating to reviews, the film has an average score of 38 out of 100, based on 21 critics, indicating "generally unfavorable reviews".

Writing for Rolling Stone, Peter Travers gave the film one star out of four, saying: "Tulip Fever, which was shot in 2014 but only hitting theatres now after years of re-cutting, retooling and release-date reshuffling, should have been allowed to die on the vine [...] The film just sits there onscreen like a wilting flower with nothing to nourish it."

In December 2018, it was released in several cinemas across the UK. It was reviewed by Adam White of The Daily Telegraph as "handsome yet cripplingly dull Tulip Fever is every bit a throwback to that age of Chocolat and Captain Corelli’s Mandolin" and that it suffered from "clumsy post-production work". It was also the penultimate film to be produced by The Weinstein Company, prior to its closure on 16 July 2018.
