= Fitzroy Anstruther-Gough-Calthorpe =

English baronet (1872–1957)

Sir Fitzroy Anstruther-Gough-Calthorpe Bt
- Born: FitzRoy Hamilton Niall Lloyd-Anstruther; 5 July 1872; Frogmore, Hampshire
- Died: 29 September 1957 (aged 85)
- Military career
- Allegiance: United Kingdom
- Branch: British Army
- Service years: 1906–
- Rank: Captain
- Awards: Military Order of Aviz (Portugal)

Sir Fitzroy Hamilton Niall Anstruther-Gough-Calthorpe, 1st Baronet (5 July 1872 – 29 September 1957), born FitzRoy Hamilton Niall Lloyd-Anstruther, was an English baronet.

== Early life ==
Fitzroy was born at Frogmore Park, Hampshire, the son of Lieutenant-Colonel Robert Hamilton Lloyd-Anstruther (1841–1914), by his marriage on 5 July 1871 to Gertrude Louisa Georgina FitzRoy (1850–1923), a daughter of Francis Horatio FitzRoy (1823–1900), by his marriage in 1849 to the Hon. Gertrude Duncombe (1827–1916). His paternal grandparents were James Hamilton Lloyd-Anstruther (1806–1882) and Georgiana Charlotte Burrell (1811–1843), who had been married in 1838. Georgiana's paternal grandparents were Peter Burrell, 1st Baron Gwydyr and Priscilla Bertie, 21st Baroness Willoughby de Eresby.

He had a brother, Reginald Lloyd-Anstruther, who died as a child in 1875, and a sister, Rosalind Gertrude (died 1903), the wife of Brigadier General Noel Armar Lowry-Corry (1867–1935), by whom she had issue.

He was educated at Harrow School.

== Military career ==
FitzRoy joined the army as a staff officer. On 7 November 1910 he changed his surname name from Lloyd-Anstruther to Anstruther-Gough-Calthorpe, discarding the name of Lloyd and adding his wife's surnames. Before World War I he served as a part-time lieutenant in the Army Motor Reserve, then in September 1915 was appointed as an aide-de-camp on the General Staff, ending the war with the rank of captain. He was created a Baronet on 1 July 1929.

== Later life ==
On 11 October 1898, FitzRoy Lloyd-Anstruther (as he then was) married the Hon. Rachel Gough-Calthorpe (1871–1951), a daughter of Augustus Gough-Calthorpe, 6th Baron Calthorpe, and Maud Augusta Louisa Duncombe. They had issue:

- Sir Richard Anstruther-Gough-Calthorpe, 2nd Baronet (1908–1985), who married Nancy Moireach Malcolmson, and had issue;
- Frances Jean Anstruther-Gough-Calthorpe (29 June 1910 – 27 October 1995), who on 13 September 1942 married Frank Alleyne Stockdale, and had issue; and
- Barbara Anstruther-Gough-Calthorpe (24 October 1911 – 30 December 2006), who on 4 February 1932 married Ian St John Lawson-Johnston, and had issue.

In 1933 the family was still living at Elvetham Hall, Hampshire, when it and nearby Minley Manor were threatened by a significant heath wildfire that involved a response by over one thousand soldiers and firefighters.

He enjoyed sailing as a member of the Royal Yacht Squadron, including possessing the yacht Amaryllis (1930), steam yacht Ombra (1937), and yacht Wren (1947), as did his son. Both father and son also enjoyed golf at the North Hants Golf Club, Fleet, Hampshire.

In 1956 he was the president of the Odiham Scout District association.

Anstruther-Gough-Calthorpe died in 1957 at the Royal Masonic Hospital, London, aged 85.

Baronetage of the United Kingdom
New creation	Baronet (of Elvetham Hall); 1929–1957	Succeeded by Richard Anstruther-Gough-Calthorpe
