= Pulsar Fusion =

British rocket company

- Industry: Aerospace, fusion power
- Founded: 2011; 15 years ago
- Headquarters: Bletchley, United Kingdom
- Key people: Richard Dinan (CEO); James Lambert; (Director of Operations); Dr. Adam Baker; (Propulsion Engineer); Lolan Naicker; (Senior Advisor Rocketry)
- Number of employees: 15 (2026)
- Website: pulsarfusion.com

Pulsar Fusion is a UK-based start-up that has demonstrated two designs of prototype rocket engine. It is headquartered in Bletchley, United Kingdom.

== History ==
Pulsar Fusion was founded by Richard Dinan in 2011. Pulsar has tested its first Hall-effect thruster for satellites, achieving an exhaust velocity of 20 km/s. Pulsar tested its hybrid polyethylene/nitrous oxide launch rocket engines in November 2021.

As of late 2022, the company website says it is developing a Direct Fusion Drive rocket for spaceflight which uses a nuclear fusion reactor, based on a Princeton field-reversed configuration.
