= Klaus Tange =

Danish actor

- Born: 7 July 1962 (age 64); Copenhagen, Denmark
- Occupation: Actor

Klaus Tange (born 7 July 1962) is a Danish actor working in theatre, film, and television.

== Biography ==
Tange was born in Copenhagen, Denmark and raised in Germany and Switzerland. In 1985 he graduated from the Danish National School of Theatre in Aarhus.

Since his graduation, Tange has worked extensively in all areas of theatre and film. He has been involved in genres ranging from experimental film and theatre, to high-profile movies and television series, as well as performances with established theatre companies. He has lived and worked in Italy, France, and Denmark.

== Key performances ==
Some of Tange's best known roles include:

- Louis in Angels of America
- Ariel in The Pillowman, at the Aarhus Theatre
- Jesus in Jesus Christ Superstar, at the Det Ny Theater
- Chance Wayne in Sweet Bird of Youth, at the Betty Nansen Theatre, Denmark
- Hair, at Théâtre Mogador in Paris

Tange has also worked with Ellen Stewart from La MaMa Experimental Theatre Club, and Claudio Carafoli at the Piccolo Eliseo in Rome. Recent film and television work includes the Emmy-nominated series Forbrydelsen (The Crime), The Strange Color of Your Body's Tears, and the 2008 Danish movie Flammen & Citronen (Flame & Citron).

== Filmography ==
Year	Title	Role	Notes
1990	In the Name of the Sovereign People	Stefan	
1991	Blue Tornado		
2007	Ibrahim	Betjent	
2008	Flammen & Citronen	Schalburg Sergent	
2012	The Forbidden Girl	Minister	
2013	L'étrange couleur des larmes de ton corps	Dan Kristensen	
2014	Gentlemen	Eddie på Montmartre	
2017	Robin	Man	
