= Politick! Magazine =

Defunct British political magazine

- Editor: Laura-Jane Foley
- Categories: British political magazines
- Frequency: Quarterly
- Circulation: 15,000
- Publisher: Politick Publications Ltd
- Founded: 2008
- Final issue: 2010
- Country: United Kingdom
- Based in: Westbury-on-Trym, Bristol
- Language: English
- Website: Website
- ISSN: 1758-3616
- OCLC: 502257699

Politick! Magazine was a quarterly British political magazine. The magazine was aimed at people aged 18 to 35 and was independent of any political party. The magazine was launched in November 2008 and was available through WHSmith, Borders and independent newsagents. Laura-Jane Foley was the magazine's founder and editor.

The first two issues of the magazine featured politicians and activists from all the major parties including David Blunkett, Lembit Öpik, Polly Toynbee, Charles Kennedy, Peter Tatchell, Michael Howard, Malcolm Rifkind, Lynne Featherstone, David Bull and Kate Hudson. The magazine also featured non-government organisations such as WWF Oxfam, Amnesty International and Christian Aid and gave information on how to get involved in political activism at all levels. It was closed in 2010.
