= John Anstruther-Gough-Calthorpe =

English businessman (born 1947)

- Born: John Austen Anstruther-Gough-Calthorpe; 14 July 1947 (age 78)
- Occupation: Property magnate
- Spouses: Lady Mary-Gaye Curzon (m. 1977; div. 1986) Vanessa Hubbard (m. 1987)
- Children: 5, including Isabella Calthorpe and Gabriella Wilde
- Parents: Sir Richard Anstruther-Gough-Calthorpe, 2nd Baronet; Nancy Malcolmson

John Austen Anstruther-Gough-Calthorpe (born 14 July 1947) is a property developer and former chairman of the Watermark Group.

== Career ==
Anstruther-Gough-Calthorpe serves as a director for the Ellis Campbell Group and Hintlesham Holdings. He is also a trustee of the Elvetham Charitable Trust and the Newcastle Charitable Trust.

== Personal life ==
Anstruther-Gough-Calthorpe is the son of Sir Richard Anstruther-Gough-Calthorpe, 2nd Baronet, and Nancy Moireach Malcolmson.

He has been married twice. His first wedding took place at Kensington Register Office on 27 May 1977 to socialite, débutante and banking heiress Lady Mary-Gaye Curzon (born 1947), daughter of the 6th Earl Howe and former wife of Kevin Esmond Peter Cooper-Key, whom she married in 1971 and divorced in 1976 and by whom she had a daughter, Pandora Cooper-Key (1973–2024), who worked at Vivienne Westwood. Anstruther-Gough-Calthorpe and his first wife, who were divorced in 1986, had three children:

- Georgiana Moireach Gay Anstruther-Gough-Calthorpe (born 1978), artist
- Isabella Amaryllis Charlotte Anstruther-Gough-Calthorpe (born 1980), actress
- Jacobi Richard Penn Anstruther-Gough-Calthorpe (born 1983), property developer

In 1987 Anstruther-Gough-Calthorpe married Vanessa Mary Teresa Llewellyn Hubbard (born 1958), the former wife of Sir David Llewellyn, 4th Baronet. Anstruther-Gough-Calthorpe and his second wife are the parents of:

- Gabriella Zanna Vanessa Anstruther-Gough-Calthorpe (born 1989), actress and model
- Octavia Elsa Anstruther-Gough-Calthorpe (born 1991)

== See also ==
- Anstruther-Gough-Calthorpe baronets
- Anstruther baronets
- Baron Calthorpe
- Gough-Calthorpe family
