= Anstruther-Gough-Calthorpe baronets =

Baronetcy in the Baronetage of the United Kingdom

- Escutcheon of the Anstruther-Gough-Calthorpe baronets of Elvetham Hall
- Creation date: 1929
- Status: extant
- Motto: Gradu diverso via una, The same way but by different steps

The Anstruther-Gough-Calthorpe Baronetcy, of Elvetham Hall in Elvetham in the County of Hampshire, is a title in the Baronetage of the United Kingdom.

It was created on 1 July 1929 for Fitzroy Anstruther-Gough-Calthorpe. Born Fitzroy Hamilton Niall Lloyd-Anstruther, he was the son of Lieutenant-Colonel Robert Hamilton Lloyd-Anstruther, Member of Parliament for Woodbridge, son of Colonel James Hamilton Lloyd-Anstruther, son of Brigadier-General Robert Anstruther, son of Sir Robert Anstruther, 3rd Baronet, of Wrae (see Anstruther baronets). In 1910, he assumed by Royal licence the surname of Anstruther only. Later the same year he assumed for himself and issue the surnames of Gough-Calthorpe in addition to that of Anstruther, having married the Hon. Rachel, eldest daughter and co-heir of Augustus Cholmondeley Gough-Calthorpe, 6th Baron Calthorpe (see the Baron Calthorpe). The first Baronet was succeeded by his son, the second Baronet. He was a Brigadier in the British Army and a member of the Hampshire County Council. As of 2014, the title is held by his grandson, the third Baronet, who succeeded in 1985. He is the eldest son of Niall Hamilton Anstruther-Gough-Calthorpe (1940–1970), eldest son of the second Baronet.

== Anstruther-Gough-Calthorpe baronets, of Elvetham Hall (1929) ==
- Sir Fitzroy Hamilton Niall Anstruther-Gough-Calthorpe, 1st Baronet (1872–1957)
- Sir Richard Hamilton Anstruther-Gough-Calthorpe, 2nd Baronet (1908–1985)
- Sir Euan Hamilton Anstruther-Gough-Calthorpe, 3rd Baronet (b. 1966)

The heir apparent is the present holder's eldest son, Barnaby Charles Anstruther-Gough-Calthorpe (b. 2005).

== See also ==
- Anstruther baronets
- Baron Calthorpe
- Gough-Calthorpe family
