= Trinity (British TV series) =

British television drama series

- Created by: Kieron Quirke; Robin French
- Directed by: Colin Teague; Declan O'Dwyer; Stephen Woolfenden
- Starring: Charles Dance; Claire Skinner; Antonia Bernath; Christian Cooke; Reggie Yates; Isabella Calthorpe; Elen Rhys; Arnab Chanda; Mark Wood; Paul Hunter; Michael Higgs; Tom Hughes; David Oakes; Rod Arthur; Anthony Calf
- Country of origin: United Kingdom
- Original language: English
- No. of series: 1
- No. of episodes: 8

Production
- Producer: Sue Howells
- Editor: Xavier Russell
- Running time: 60 minutes (approx. 44–48 mins excluding adverts)

Original release
- Network: ITV2
- Release: 20 September – 8 November 2009

Trinity is a British television drama series which was broadcast on ITV2 from September to November 2009. The series is set in the fictional Trinity College of Bridgeford University, and stars Charles Dance, Claire Skinner, Antonia Bernath, Christian Cooke, Reggie Yates, and Isabella Calthorpe.

== Premise ==
A new academic year begins at the ancient and prestigious Trinity College, Bridgeford University, and among the new students is Charlotte Arc (Antonia Bernath), whose father Richard Arc (Nick Sidi) was formerly a student and then professor at the college. Richard left the institution suddenly some years earlier and had never explained why, and two weeks before Charlotte is due to join the college, he is found dead in mysterious circumstances. Convinced that her father's death is in some way linked to the college, Charlotte enrolls determined to try to uncover the truth.

As Charlotte and her fellow students settle in, they begin to realise that all is not what it seems at Trinity. Beneath the glossy, glamorous veneer lurks a much darker world, governed by strict codes of conduct and secret societies, most notably the mysterious Dandelion Club whose members are among the college's wealthiest and most privileged students who are used to getting their own way.

A progressive new Warden of the college, Dr Angela Donne (Claire Skinner), is trying to modernize the institution. But she has a fight on her hands from those determined to preserve the old order, including the arrogant and sinister Dean, Dr Edmund Maltravers (Charles Dance), and the spoiled and manipulative President of the Dandelion Club, Dorian Gaudain (Christian Cooke), backed by his father, the interfering Lord Ravensby (Anthony Calf).

Besides Charlotte, the new group of students trying to find their way in the college include the streetwise and fiercely intelligent Theo Mackenzie (Reggie Yates), the poetry-loving hopeless romantic Maddy Talbot (Elen Rhys), Dorian's stunning but emotionally cold cousin Rosalind Gaudain (Isabella Calthorpe), and the lost stoners Angus (Mark Wood) and Raj (Arnab Chanda).

When the college's champion rower, Ross Bonham (David Oakes), turns up dead, a mysterious series of events begins to unfold. But those charged with protecting the secrets that lie within Trinity's ancient halls of learning aren't about to give them up without a fight.

== Production ==
The series was filmed primarily on the campus of Royal Holloway, University of London, with most scenes taking place in or around the Founder's Building. The Founder's Building appears in the exterior shots as well as in some interior shots as the fictional Trinity College. Some interior scenes were also filmed in the Great Hall of Dulwich College in Dulwich, London. Several of the exterior scenes were also filmed at Painshill Park, a renowned 18th-century landscape garden in Cobham, Surrey.

== Cast ==
Students

- Antonia Bernath as Charlotte Arc
- Reggie Yates as Theo Mackenzie
- Christian Cooke as Dorian Gaudain
- Isabella Calthorpe as Rosalind Gaudain
- Elen Rhys as Maddy Talbot
- Arnab Chanda as Raj Puri
- Mark Wood as Angus Furgus
- Tom Hughes as Jonty Millingden
- David Oakes as Ross Bonham
- Liam Bergin as Rupert
- Saif Alfalasi as Vigor

Staff

- Charles Dance as Dr Edmund Maltravers
- Claire Skinner as Dr Angela Donne
- Paul Hunter as Dr Linus Cooper
- Michael Higgs as Dr Gabriel Lloyd
- Rod Arthur as Pete Dobkin

Other characters

- Anthony Calf as Lord Ravensby
- Mark Aiken as Mr Pearce
- Nick Sidi as Richard Arc
- Tara Ward as American Voice

== Broadcast ==
The show aired weekly on Sundays at 10pm on ITV2 between 20 September 2009 and 8 November 2009, with a repeat showing on the same channel on Wednesdays at 9pm. The drama was originally planned to air at the start of the year but was delayed to allow Paris Hilton's British Best Friend to be broadcast. Trinity had its premiere online at 10pm on 13 September 2009, exactly a week before its TV premiere on 20 September 2009. Episodes 2 to 7 (with the exception of episode 3) premiered online Sundays at 11pm after the previous episode had been shown on ITV2 (episode 3 premiered online on Wednesday 30 September 2009). Episode 8 had no online premiere and was first shown on ITV2 Sunday 8 November. ITV2 repeated the entire series between 23 November 2009 and 2 December 2009 in a 9pm slot.

In 2010, it was confirmed by ITV2 Channel Director Zai Bennett that Trinity would not return for a second series.

== Episodes ==
No.	Title	Directed by	Written by	Original release date	UK viewers (millions)
1	"1.1"	Colin Teague	Robin French & Kieron Quirke	20 September 2009	1.192
One evening as Richard Arc leaves the church at which he is vicar he is accosted by a sinister stranger, demanding Arc tells him what he knows. Richard, petrified, suffers a massive heart attack and dies. On a bright Autumn day we first see Trinity college – red brick, classical and grand. On the steps of the college sits Charlotte Arc, daughter of the recently deceased Richard. Also arriving for the start of term is Theo, a cool fresher, clearly feeling slightly out of place among the eccentric Trinitonians. Meanwhile the beautiful, but icy, Rosalind is visiting her cousin, Dorian in his rooms. With little preamble the pair begin having passionate (and noisy) sex. Worried about the lack of morals at the college, Charlotte’s mother gives her daughter Richard’s treasured bible and leaves. As Charlotte picks up the bible a photo falls out of her father at Trinity with another woman. In the office of Professor Linus Cooper, the extremely twitchy academic is working on some complicated looking medical files when Maltravers, the Dean, enters looking for him. In reference to the files Maltraver’s enquires after ‘Galahad’, clearly the subject of their research. According to Cooper he is not doing well and they need a new ‘hourglass’ to continue. Charlotte introduces herself to Theo, and invites him for tea in her room with a few people. Theo finds himself in a room with four earnest, and quite dull, Christian students who tell him more about the Feast of Fools – how it is run by the Dandelion Club and will be a debauched and shocking evening. In the staff common room Maltravers welcomes Angela Doone, the new Warden of Trinity College, and introduces her to the Dons as the woman who will modernise Trinity. But later, when Dorian visits the Dean he warns him about the new modernist Warden; Maltravers informs Dorian that the Feast of Fools has been cancelled by order of the Warden; apparently picking two students from lower-class families to be the jesters for the year is no longer acceptable. Theo meets a dizzy and vague new student, Maddy. Meanwhile Angus and Raj, a pair of geeky students, meet, bond over a bong and discuss their main ambition at Trinity; losing their virginity.
2	"1.2"	Colin Teague	Robin French & Kieron Quirke	27 September 2009	0.937
At Trinity’s rowing lake the whole college is assembled as a single student, Ross, attempts to beat the entire rowing crew in a race. From the bank he is cheered on by his boyfriend Jonty, one of the leading members of the Dandelion club. Maltravers and his obsequious stooge Cooper are discussing Ross’ performance in the race. It appears that Ross is the mysterious ‘Galahad’ who is the subject of their experiments. As Ross wins the race Cooper raises concerns about Ross’ psychological well being; he is performing excellently physically, but they must get a new ‘hour-glass’ and quickly. Maltravers is confident that the hourglass will be with them soon; he is having it smuggled to the college hidden in a statue which is being returned following refurbishment. At the meeting of the College Council the Warden is informed that the refurbishment of the statue which is being returned will cost £60,000, and the damage was initially caused by a Dandelion Club tradition. Despite her attempts to force the club to pay for the damage she is outvoted by Maltravers and the other dons. However, as he leaves the meeting, Maltravers himself warns Dorian that the club is not to mess with the statue under any circumstances. It is clear that Dorian has plans to uphold the tradition. In the student common room Theo and another student, David, are challenged to a high-stakes game of pool by Jonty and Ross. With £500 riding on the result the pressure is on for them but, despite taunting from Jonty, Theo sinks the black and wins the game. David taunts the losers mildly leading to Ross utterly losing his composure; he picks up David and throws him with almost superhuman strength across the room. Meanwhile Dorian is busy using his unsuspecting Fools, Raj and Angus, to carry out his plans for the statue. Without their knowledge he drugs them, enabling him to paint them gold and put them in place of the real statue. Conscious, but unable to move, Raj and Angus are less than happy about being positioned as gay lovers entwined. As other members of the Dandelion club move the genuine statue to a hidden location they mistakenly barge into Maddy’s room. As they leave the room they don’t notice a small hour-glass shaped pendant fall to the floor. In light of Ross’ assault on David, the Warden convenes a tribunal with the aim of expelling Ross from Trinity. Theo offers to testify that he was a witness to the unprovoked assault. At the tribunal it appears that everything is going to plan; Dr Lloyd and the Warden vote for Ross’ expulsion; only Maltravers supports the Dandelion. However, just as the Warden is announcing the decision, David stands up and changes his story, he now claims that he provoked Ross but the Warden made him lie because she hates the Dandelion club. In light of David’s outburst Maltravers fines Theo for lying to the tribunal; coincidentally the fine is equal to the amount of the original bet he won, £500. Both Theo and the Warden are incensed by the apparent power of the Dandelion club. Maltravers and Cooper approach the statue to search for the hourglass and discover Raj and Angus, who have now recovered sufficiently to flee. A furious Maltravers threatens Dorian to reveal the location of the genuine statue but is left frustrated when he finds the hourglass missing from its hiding place. When they inform the mysterious American voice of the hourglass’ loss and ask for time to find it they are informed that ‘termination’ is the recommended course, which shocks both Cooper and Maltravers deeply. The following day tragedy strikes the quads of Trinity when the body of Ross is discovered. It appears he has thrown himself from the clocktower.
3	"1.3"	Colin Teague	Robin French & Kieron Quirke	4 October 2009	0.855
Trinity is left reeling by the violent death of its star rower. As a devastated Jonty returns to the room he shared with Ross, he discovers Maltravers searching it. He watches in secret as the Dean finds and removes what he was looking for: an incriminating note from himself to the student, hidden in Ross’s personal belongings. Ross’s brother Timothy arrives for the funeral and instantly blames the University for the student’s death. He demands £100,000 for his silence or threatens to take the story to the press. Maltravers is still searching for the missing hour glass pendant and vents his considerable fury on Dorian, who has been unable to locate it. As punishment, The Dean intimates that unless the errant student recovers the necklace he will have to renounce his presidency of the Dandelion Club. Back in her dorm room, Charlotte is speaking with Theo and Maddy about Ross and remembers that when the troubled student came to see her, he had been on his knees when she opened the door. Pulling up the carpet, she finds a hidden note with the cryptic message ‘look under the blades’ scrawled across it. The Warden pays Dr Cooper a visit and asks to see the medical records for the rowing club. She ensures a visibly agitated Cooper that she simply wants to ensure there are no skeletons to hide from any possible press investigation and is not instigating a witch hunt. Dorian’s position is becoming increasingly precarious as he learns the Dandelion Club accounts have been frozen by Maltravres. Unable to pay a student to do his work he faces the prospect of being put on academic probation for failure to complete course work and consequently would be forced out of the presidency. All the incentive he needs to resume the search for the necklace. Ignoring the Warden’s warning about staying out of things, Charlotte, pays a bereft Jonty a visit to discuss the note and to see if he can shed any light on Ross’s last words. He explains that rowers refer to oars as blades but other than that he says he can’t help, however it’s obvious that he has some idea of what his dead lover might have been referring to. As the students gather for Ross’s funeral, Charlotte learns that Ross’s body is due for cremation, but when she passes the body in the open casket, she sees that the rower’s beloved blades have been placed in the coffin with him. Remembering the message on the note, Charlotte is convinced the answer lies in the casket alongside the body. Charlotte hatches a plan to get to Ross’s coffin before he is cremated and attempts to enlist the help of a very reluctant Maddy and Theo, but it seems Jonty has plans for the body too. Interrupted before he can open the coffin, he hides as Charlotte searches around the casket. Dorian is frantically trying to retain his presidency and attempts to enlist the help of Rosalind to complete a particular piece of course work whose deadline is looming. When she refuses, he threatens to blow Rosalind’s horse’s brains out in the middle of the quad. Rosalind doesn’t require any further incentive and duly produces the essay thus securing Dorian’s position. That evening, the Dandelion Club meet to raise a toast to Ross, however, Dorian struggles to provide the lavish catering the boys are accustomed as the club’s assets are still frozen. Maltravers comes to the rescue with French cuisine and vintage wines, but in return, demands the abdication of their president. A surprisingly impassioned speech by Dorian sees The Dean chased from the room as the spirit of solidarity takes over. Later that night, Ross’s coffin is cremated on the lake in a moving tribute to the passionate and talented rower. As the entire college gather at the water’s edge to watch the stunning funeral pyre and say their final goodbyes, Jonty is in the woods with the body he stole from the crematorium during the uproar caused by Charlotte earlier in the day. As the empty coffin burns, he cuts an hour glass shaped implant from beneath a tattoo of a pair of blades on his lover’s buttocks. “Look beneath the blades”
4	"1.4"	Stephen Woolfenden	Robin French & Kieron Quirke	11 October 2009	0.882
Angus, Raj and their band of geeks are assembled in a bed-sit discussing what it might be like to discover a world outside of Algebra. A sign on the door reads ‘All girls welcome’; unlikely to be obliged. Here enters Rosalind and her followers, eager to manipulate the ogling boys to better her election campaign by enlisting their help…in return for hollow promises that they could become her boyfriend. The election headquarters are set up in the main University quad. A contrast between the two candidates’ election tactics is obvious: exhibitionist Rosalind puts on a cheerleading display as Charlotte hands out her sober, bullet pointed flyers. Overlooked by Edmund’s study, he watches in a calculating manner. A heated exchange between him and Angela occurs about the progressive vs the traditional, i.e. Charlotte vs Rosalind. Edmunds main gripe with Charlotte is one of her policies is to abolish The Dandelion Club if she is elected. The Marquis of Ravensbury and Edmund discuss The Dandelion Club in the half light of the Dean’s private study. The Marquis is visibly enraged by the attempts of Charlotte Arc to undermine the refuge of the privileged. Still unable to move on from the mysterious events surrounding his lover’s death Jonty takes to examining a strange material that he removed from Ross’s buttocks. He seems to be determining something medically significant. Using himself as the experiment he swallows a fragment of the strange material and immediately falls to the ground in agony. Charlotte becomes hysterical about the circulation of Rosalind’s latest campaign poster involving her head campaigner Theo kissing her arch enemy. The slogan reads ‘He prefers Rosalind, don’t you?’ She delivers an ultimatum: quite her, or quit my campaign. Theo agrees to not see Rosalind until the elections are over. The Marquis and Dorian meet for a father son discussion about how to manage Charlotte’s maverick behaviour. However, the meeting soon turns sinister and Dorian’s interjections result in his father hitting him across the face. Dorian is left alone and is visibly upset. Theo goes to visit Rosalind despite his pact with Charlotte. Charlotte’s last attempt to curry support is met with controversy. Rosalind arrives to quash the demonstration by delivering a humiliating soaking with water pistols. Charlotte however, fights back, knocking Rosalind unconscious much to the amusement of onlookers. Charlotte’s pluck earns her a 5% lead in the polls. Rosalind is outraged that Charlotte has overtaken her in the polls. She enlists Dorian’s help and takes his advice. He suggests that she spread rumours about Charlotte to taint her appeal. She decides, unbeknownst to Dorian, to spread a rumour that Charlotte and he have slept together. Charlotte finds out the rumour through Maddy. Believing it to be Dorian’s doing she confronts him and an embarrassingly indiscreet scene unravels in the uni restaurant. Thanks to Rosalind’s rumour-mongering Charlotte is branded a hypocrite for fraternising with the enemy. Theo intervenes last minute and steals Rosalind’s election speech to help Charlotte out. He writes Charlotte’s speech to dispel the stereotype that she is boring. The election takes place. Rosalind, smugly confident, takes to the stage with a serious message to try and prove she is both fun and capable. Thanks to Theo’s foresight Charlotte takes to the stage with some jokes, and ends up looking the obvious winner. Jonty has sneaked into Edmund’s study and defaces the walls. He seems to be looking for something. A hooded figure appears out of the darkness and sprays a substance in Jonty’s eyes. He drops to the floor, unconscious. Aware that Rosalind’s chance is slipping away Dorian and Rosalind get Raj and Angus to rig the voting system in exchange for her declarations of love. They fall for her ruse once again. Rosalind wins the rigged election. After the party she sets Raj and Angus up to an embarrassing stunt. Edmund and Dr Cooper return to find the study defaced and graffitied. The Dandelion crest is trashed
5	"1.5"	Stephen Woolfenden	Jack Williams	18 October 2009	0.827
It’s Founders Day at the college and all the old alumni are expected back. Angela briefs the students about the good behaviour that is expected of them and reveals a celebrity guest alumnus, Mr Crispin Hunter. News of his attendance causes a stir with Edmund as the two share a murky past. Maddy’s fiancé arrives for the celebrations. Gethin’s greeting is overly enthusiastic and we get the feeling Maddy’s feelings have changed. Raj and Angus are up to their usual tricks as college fools. Their contribution to the Founders Day celebrations fails to deliver the necessary comic leverage. Dorian has a go at them but they fail to take him seriously. Angela confides in Gabriel about her worries concerning Dr Cooper. Her findings from his study seem to be making her very anxious. She questions why documents with Richard Arc’s personal symbol were found in Coopers cupboard. Angela also reveals why she has invited Crispin to the event; she believes he holds the key to her gaining control at the college – without Edmund. The alumni arrive. Millionaire Crispin makes a dramatic entrance with Claudette his glamorous assistant. Angela takes Crispin on a guided tour of the college facilities and exhibitions. The art exhibition offers up quite a surprise when Rosalind shows her display of deliberately controversial erotic paintings and sculptures. They cause quite a stir with both Angela and Crispin, for totally different reasons. Crispin and Edmund come face to face in the Biology lab. We learn the background of their feud. Whilst at college Maltravers and the rest of the Dandelions subjected Crispin to years of humiliation; mocking and bullying him as a college fool. Crispin reveals the revenge he now seeks. Crispin and Claudette detail their plans to reform the college teaching methods, get rid of Edmund and give full control to Angela. Edmund appears calm and disdainful, shrugging off Crispin’s threats. Edmund and Dr Cooper try to unravel the identity of the vandal. Dr Cooper expresses his concerns about the missing transplant and how this will affect the project. Gethin is holding court in the student bar, boring Theo to death with his bad jokes. Maddy is less than impressed and it is clear her feelings now lie elsewhere. Dorian shows Crispin around the Dandelion club. Dorian discovers that Charlotte Arc’s father, Richard, was president in the years that Crispin was a college fool. Dorian tells Charlotte who is horrified. Dorian mysteriously arrives at Rosalind’s room with a package containing a wedding dress. He tells her that his father wishes her to check it is the correct size. Rosalind seems strained and anxious. Dorian urges her to break off her relationship with Theo. She is reluctant, saying she ‘can’t tell him the truth.’ Charlotte introduces herself to Crispin, asking him about her father. He tells her that her father was horrible. She is devastated. Straight after, Dorian and the rest of The Dandelion Club burst in and announce that they will, in tradition, be taking the alumni hostage. Angela tries to intervene but is turned away. Edmund collects a vial of narcotic substance from Dr Cooper. He uses it to drug Crispin’s PA to extract information from her. Back at The Dandelion Club the debauchery is in full swing. Charlotte manages to sneak in and talk to Crispin privately. He delivers the blow that her father was having an affair with Angela Donne for four years. Rosalind ends her relationship with Theo based on the secret surrounding the wedding dress. A fight breaks out between Gethin and the Dandelion’s over the lewd comments they direct at Maddy. In the scramble Maddy loses her necklace (containing the transplant) and Dorian discovers it on the floor. Maddy finally decides to break up with Gethin realising that she is falling for Theo. Angela, Crispin, Gabriel and Claudette gather to sign the legal agreement about the college. Just as he’s about to sign, Edmund calls Crispin away and blackmails him with the highly damaging information given up by a drugged Claudette. To save face Crispin withdraws his support from the agreement. A visibly angry and upset Charlotte confronts Angela about her father’s infidelity. Back in Edmund’s study, in the wake of all the hedonism, Dorian hands over the transplant to the Dean. Edmund is visibly elated and Dorian is similarly pleased to have proven himself as a worthy dandelion Club President.
6	"1.6"	Stephen Woolfenden	Ian Buchan	25 October 2009	0.691
Raj and Angus are out enjoying a relaxing bout of fishing when the frivolities are interrupted by Ross's corpse emerging from the lake. Meanwhile Angela visits an increasingly frustrated Jonty who is busy taking his anger out on a punching bag. She tries to pursue him to start re-joining lectures to which he scoffs at her pleas stating he When Dr Cooper goes to retrieve his mail he gets an unsuspected shock when he finds heart in his pigeon hole with a sinister note saying 'I know what you've done…' Dorian taunts a dejected Rosalind by saying he's received an invite to her impending wedding to which she tells him to 'sod off' and declares she intends to enjoy her final 4 weeks of freedom with other men. After Professor Cooper's disturbing threat, he and Maltravers decide to examine Ross's bloated corpse and are shocked to discover the implant has already been removed. Theo continues to wallow in self pity after his split with Rosalind and decides to confront her on her brazen attitude. This altercation only serves to drive Rosalind to try and seduce her tutor Gabriel. After swallowing a piece of the implant that he removed from Ross's buttocks Jonty starts to feel stronger, more viral but most of all, more aggressive. As the changes start to take effect he ends up picking a fight with one of the other Dandelions which is eventually broken up by Dr Cooper. Meanwhile Dorian continues his attempts to court Charlotte which unsurprisingly ends in disaster. After comforting a shaken Jonty he discovers it is in fact him sending the threatening messages. When Maltravers finds out about Jonty's plans to expose him and Cooper he gives him a deadly ultimatum. Rosalind eventually gets Gabriel by himself and attempts to seduce him. She almost succeeds until he finally comes to his senses and asks her to leave his classroom. Facing rejection and the thought of an impending arranged marriage, Rosalind breaks down.
7	"1.7"	Declan O'Dwyer	Robin French & Kieron Quirke	1 November 2009	0.680
It’s the Winter Ball and Angus and Raj take desperate measures to get a date as they look for a last chance to lose their virginity. Meanwhile Maltravers tells Dr Cooper of the project’s plans to send an Envoy to check on their progress and deal with Charlotte Arc. These revelations undoubtedly raise concerns in both of them for Charlotte’s safety. Still pining over Theo, and angered by Dorian’s spiteful comments, Rosalind decides to resign as student rep. This then leaves the position open for Charlotte to finally have her chance at abolishing the Dandelion Club for good – will she go through with it now she has feelings for Dorian? Unbeknownst to Charlotte, the shady Envoy sent from America reveals the other, more sinister reason for his arrival – to extract information from Charlotte, by force if necessary. Maltravers objects, claiming that he has sworn to protect the daughter of Richard Arc but his protestations fall on deaf ears, will the Dean take matters into his own hands? Maltravers pleads with Dorian to persuade Charlotte into abandoning her ambitions in abolishing The Dandelion Club and is overjoyed when she reveals that she can’t go through with it because of her increasing feelings for him. The Warden is dismayed as Charlotte looks like she may not go through with it. However, Dr Lloyd helps Charlotte make up her mind and this sparks a romance with the Warden that Dr Lloyd has so desperately yearned for. During the ball Theo finds a new romance when he realises his feelings for Maddy but ends up protecting Rosalind. After changing her mind on calling the plebiscite, Charlotte is torn between Dorian and protecting the Dandelion Club and ends up in a tight spot as Dorian makes his move.
8	"1.8"	Declan O'Dwyer	Robin French & Kieron Quirke	8 November 2009	0.674
It’s the final episode of the series and Maltravers has to face the consequences of his actions as Lord Ravensbury comes back to clear up the matter of Maltravers’ murder of the Envoy. Lord Ravensbury checks in with the Project to discover the verdict of Maltravers’ fate and he reveals he is deemed more important to them alive than dead. Rosalind wakes to find Theo watching over her after her drunken situation from the ball. In a tender moment between them she admits she still has feelings for him and they kiss. Moments after Lord Ravensbury barges in and throws Theo out. He makes it clear to Rosalind that her wedding’s been brought forward and she has no choice but to accept her destiny. Maltravers tries in vain to dissuade the Warden from calling the plebiscite and she offers him an ultimatum. Tell her what he’s hiding within the confines of the club and she’ll call it off, he plays dumb and the council meeting is called to abolish the Dandelion Club – but where is Charlotte? Angus and Raj fall out after Angus went off with the Korean girls and as temperatures come to boil they end up having fight to divide up their stash of weed. Meanwhile Lord Ravensbury checks in on Lancelot and learns that after so many earlier failed experiments, Jonty (while under sedation) is proving to be a huge success. He appears to be elated with Dr Cooper’s progress with the project but then gives him a terrible ultimatum for his previous failings… After their kiss at the ball The Warden tries to clear the air with Gabriel and only succeeds in upsetting him. Charlotte is held at Dorian’s pleasure and Dorian has a short time to win over Charlotte after his betrayal. Charlotte uses all her charms to get out of the situation she is in but things go from bad to worse when Dr Cooper finds them. Rosalind makes a last attempt to escape from the web she is caught in by trying to run away with Theo. Dr Cooper feels the strain as things come to a head between him and Charlotte and just as the situation reaches a dire point a surprise stranger intervenes.

== Home release ==
A three-disc DVD set was released on 9 November 2009 (BBFC Certificate 15). Special features include an exclusive behind-the-scenes feature with actors Reggie Yates and Christian Cooke.
