= Army Motor Reserve =

British Army corps

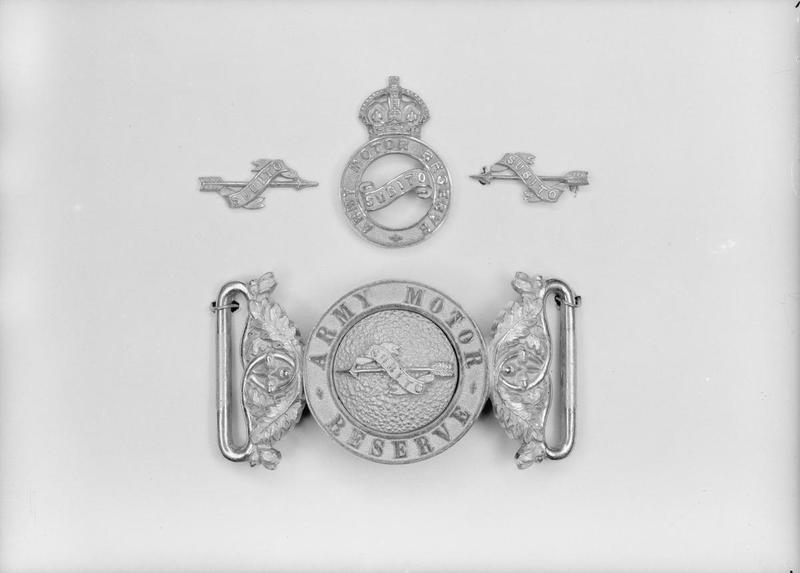

The Army Motor Reserve was a British Army corps created in 1906 and disbanded in 1913. The Reserve dated back to 1900, when a Mechanical Transport Committee was set up under the jurisdiction of the Royal Engineers. The committee was replaced by the Motor Volunteer Corps in 1903, which consisted of 31 motorcycles and 43 automobiles. In 1906 the Volunteer Corps were disbanded and replaced by the Motor Reserve. At the time, there were 45 officers, and 150 privates in the Corps. By 1909, the reserve consisted of 134 officers. In November 1913, the Reserve was disbanded. Charles Rolls was a member of the Reserve.
