= Peter Gadiot =

British actor (born 1985)

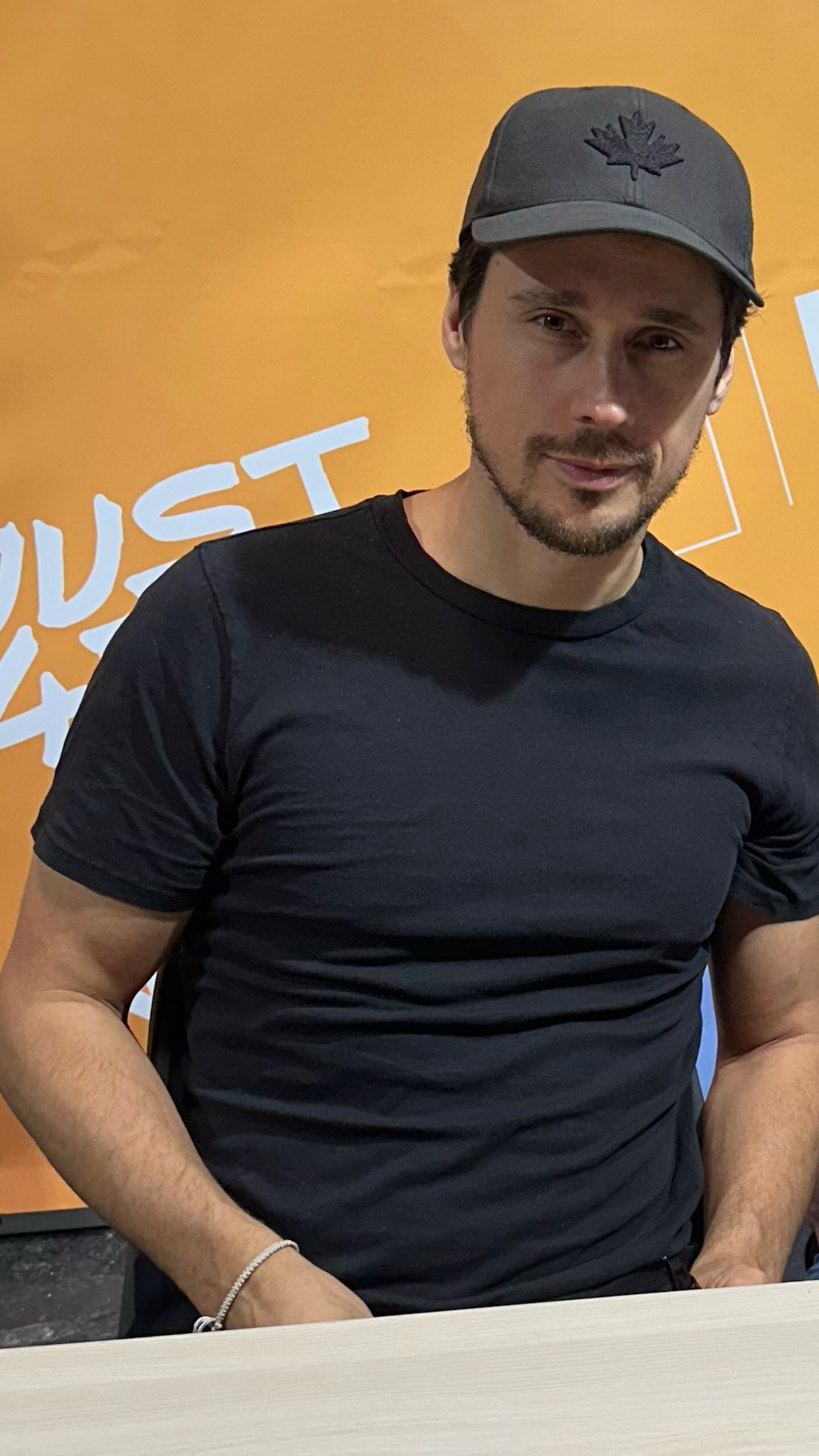
- Gadiot in 2024
- Born: 2 January 1985 (age 41); Sussex, England
- Other name: Alan Peter Gadiot Nava
- Occupation: Actor
- Years active: 2010–present

Alan-Peter Gadiot (/ˈɡædioʊ/, born 2 January 1985) is a British actor known for his roles as James Valdez in the USA Network show Queen of the South (2016–2021) and as Shanks in Netflix's series One Piece (2023). He also played Cyrus in ABC's Once Upon a Time in Wonderland (2013–2014), Adam in Showtime's Yellowjackets (2021), and Tom Westfall in season two of NBC's Quantum Leap (2023–2024).

== Early life ==
Peter Gadiot was born in England, raised in East Grinstead, West Sussex, and educated in London. His father is Dutch, and his mother is Mexican. Gadiot speaks English and Spanish and has one older brother.

He holds citizenship in the United Kingdom, the Netherlands, and Mexico.

== Career ==
Gadiot trained classically at Drama Centre London and has appeared in numerous stage productions. His past credits include MTV's Hot Mess, the British series My Spy Family (2010) and a British horror film 13Hrs (2010), also known by the name Night Wolf.

In 2013, Gadiot made his American network debut as Cyrus, the handsome and mysterious Genie, in ABC's Once Upon a Time in Wonderland. That same year, Gadiot starred opposite Léa Seydoux in a short film (campaign) Prada: Candy for the fragrance Prada Candy L'Eau, directed by Wes Anderson and Roman Coppola. He also appeared in three episodes of the British series Fresh Meat, a Channel 4 dramedy with a large cult following and starred in the German horror film The Forbidden Girl (2013).

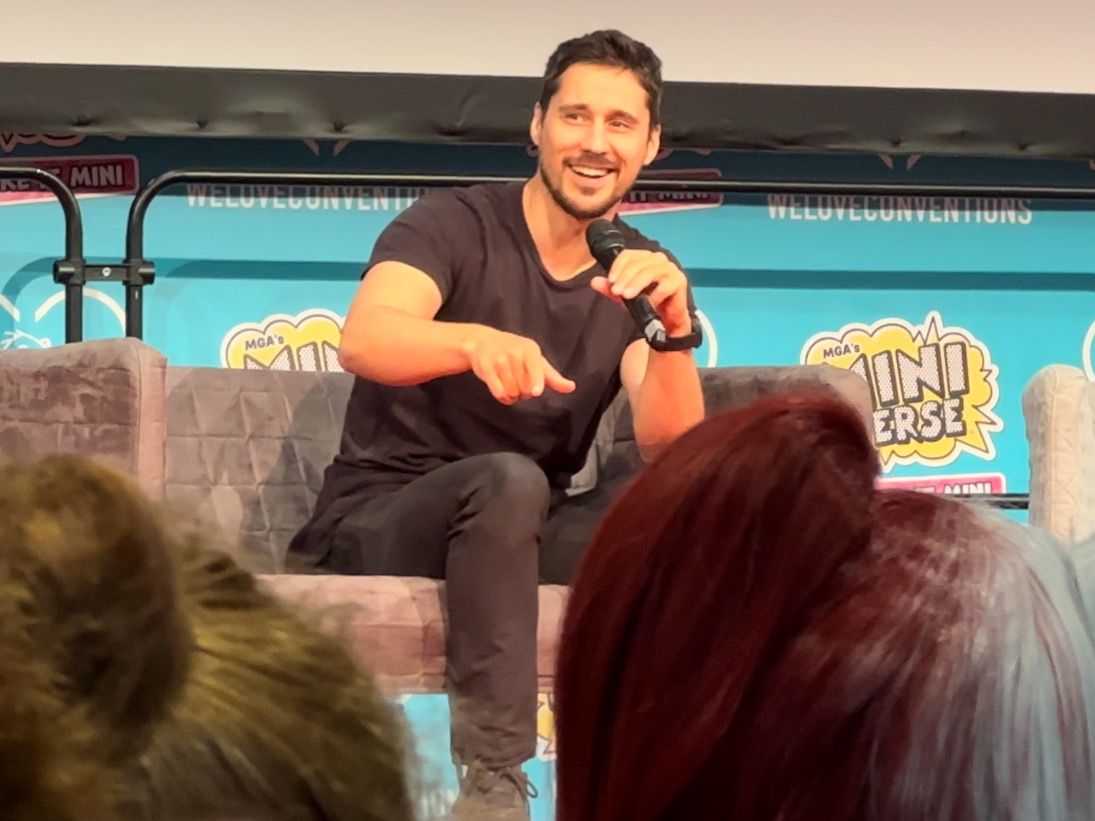
Peter Gadiot on stage at German Film Comic Con. (18-08-2024)

Gadiot went behind the camera to write, direct and produce the short film 12–17, released in 2014. The short film is about young men who would deceive younger girls into falling in love with them before emotionally blackmailing them into becoming prostitutes (loverboys). The short film is called 12–17, because that's the age of most girls who are trafficked. Also in 2014, Gadiot played the recurring role of Caesar in the series Matador and in 2015 the role of Ka in the Canadian-American miniseries Tut.

In 2016, Gadiot went back to the theatre and played the lead role of Petruchio in Shakespeare's The Taming of the Shrew at the Harman Center for the Arts in Washington DC.

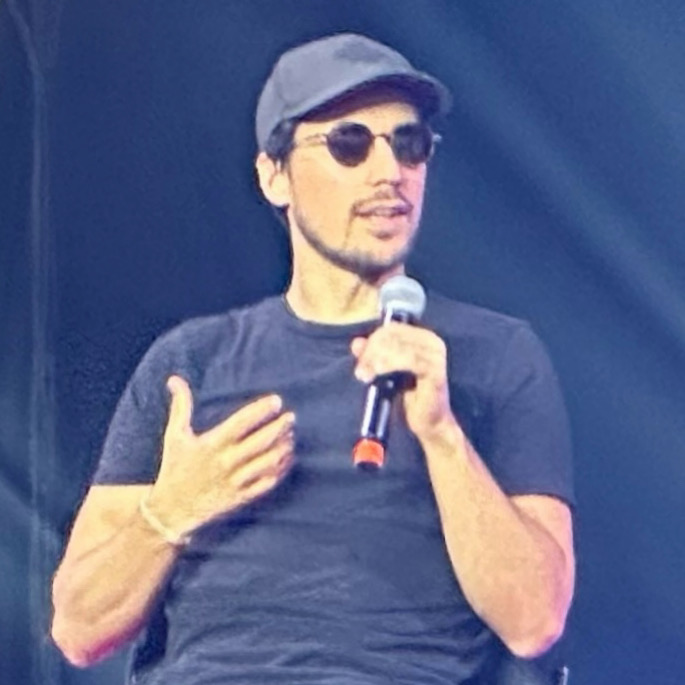
Peter Gadiot on stage at Torino Comics (13 April 2024)

From 2016 to 2021, Gadiot starred as James Valdez in the USA Network's crime drama series Queen of the South, an adaptation of Arturo Pérez-Reverte's best-selling novel La Reina del Sur. Gadiot won the 2017 Imagen Award for Best Supporting Actor – Television for his presentation of James Valdez in Queen of the South. In 2021, the fifth and final season of Queen of the South was broadcast on USA Network.

Beside his role in Queen of the South, Gadiot played Mister Mxyzptlk in The CW's Supergirl in the second season (2017). And Gadiot starred in the Rock 'n Roll miniseries All You Need Is Me (2018), which is released on Studio+ and Canalplus. Gadiot played the lead guitarist Stephen.

In the drama film Another Girl, released in 2021, Gadiot played Dave Hastings, the married boss of the main character. The film picks up where its predecessor, the cult hit Ask Me Anything, left off.

Also in 2021, Gadiot portrayed Adam Martin in Showtime's series Yellowjackets. Gadiot plays an artist who has an affair with one of the main characters after having an auto collision with her. The series premiered in November 2021.

In 2022, Gadiot went behind the camera again to write, direct and produce the short film Black Ewe.

Gadiot was cast in 2022 as Felix, a recurring role in NBC's pilot based on the Dutch series A'dam & Eva. Shooting of the pilot ended in Montreal, Canada.

In 2023, Gadiot made a brief appearance in the Apple TV series Silo.

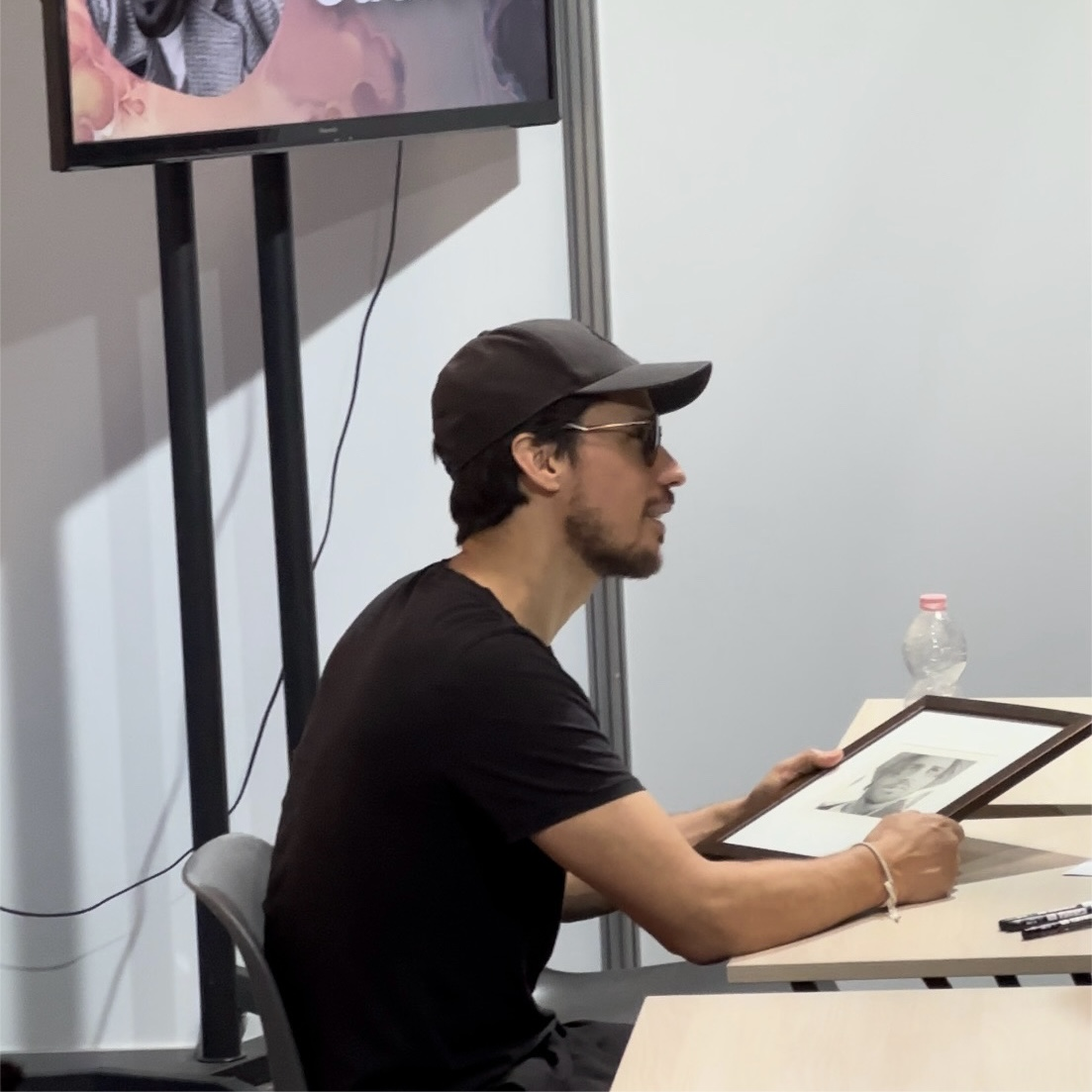
Peter Gadiot meeting fans at Torino Comics (13 April 2024)

Gadiot played Shanks in the Netflix's adventure fantasy live action television series One Piece, which is based on the ongoing Japanese manga series of the same name. Shanks is the captain of the Red-Haired Pirates and the man who inspired Luffy to become the King of the Pirates. One Piece premiered on 31 August 2023.

Gadiot starred as Tom Westfall, a U.S. Army Officer, former special forces, in the second season of NBC's Quantum Leap. The second season premiered on 4 October 2023, on NBC. The show is a sequel to the 1989 to 1993 NBC drama of the same name, set 30 years later after Dr. Sam Beckett (Scott Bakula) stepped into the Quantum Leap accelerator and vanished.

In the spring of 2024, Gadiot started filming the BBC's production of Nine Bodies in a Mexican Morgue on the Canary Islands.

Consistently throughout the years, Gadiot has been modeling for different brands like Kooples, Tommy Hilfiger, Topshop, Acne and others. In August 2023, Gadiot became the marketing face for Talisker's 30-year-old single malt Scotch whisky.

== Filmography ==
=== Film ===
Year	Title	Role	Notes
2010	13Hrs aka Night Wolf	Stephen Moore	Main role, feature film
2013	The Forbidden Girl	Toby	Main role, feature film
2013	Prada: Candy	Gene	Main role, short film
2014	12–17	—N/a	Writer, director, producer; short film
2019	Velvet Buzzsaw	Ricky Blane	Uncredited
2021	Another Girl	Dave Hastings	Main role, feature film
2022	Black Ewe	—N/a	Writer, director, producer; short film

=== Television ===
Year	Title	Role	Notes
2010	My Spy Family	Troy Falconi	Episode: "The Cheating Affair"
2013	Fresh Meat	Javier	3 episodes, season 3
2013–2014	Once Upon a Time in Wonderland	Cyrus	Main role, 13 episodes
2014	Matador	Caesar	Recurring role, 10 episodes
2015	Tut	Ka	Recurring role, 3 episodes, miniseries
2016–2021	Queen of the South	James Valdez	Main role, 49 episodes, seasons 1–3, 5
2017	Supergirl	Mister Mxyzptlk	2 episodes (season 2)
2018	All You Need Is Me	Stephen	Main role, miniseries
2021	Yellowjackets	Adam Martin	Recurring role, 8 episodes, season 1
2022	Project Icon	Jesus	Main role, TV series
2022	Unnamed Mike Daniels pilot	Felix	Pilot based on Dutch series A'dam & Eva
2023	Silo	'Mechanic'	3 episodes, season 1
2023	One Piece	Shanks	Recurring role, 3 episodes, season 1
2023–2024	Quantum Leap	Tom Westfall	Main role, 7 episodes, season 2
2025	Nine Bodies in a Mexican Morgue	Carlos García Méndez	Main role, 6 episodes
2026	Memory of a Killer	Dave	Main role

=== Theatre ===
Year	Play	Role	Writer/director	Venue/company
	Vag and the Boys	Caravaggio	Roger Mason	Ensemble Studio Theater
2016	The Taming of the Shrew	Petruchio	Ed Iskandar	Shakespeare Theater Company, Washington DC

== Awards and nominations ==
Year	Association	Category	Nominated work	Result	Ref.
2017	Imagen Foundation Awards	Best Supporting Actor – Television	Queen of the South	Won	
2018	Imagen Foundation Awards	Best Supporting Actor – Television	Queen of the South	Nominated	
2022	Pena de Prata	Best Ensemble in a Drama Series	Yellowjackets	Nominated	

== Philanthropy ==
Gadiot actively campaigns against slavery and human trafficking. To raise awareness of the problem of modern-day slavery, he rowed Against Slavery across the Atlantic Ocean from the Caribbean to Africa with a crew in about 39 days. Gadiot then ran the Marathon des Sables (MDS - Marathon of the Sands), which is held for six consecutive days in the Saharan desert. The 250 km (160 mi) ultra marathon, which includes running across ground with towering sand dunes, uneven rocky terrain and dangerous valleys, is considered the toughest foot race on Earth. He finally completed his journey by climbing Mount Kilimanjaro. In doing so, Gadiot completed a trilogy of extreme challenges within one year. In between, Gadiot gave talks to thousands of school children educating them and creating awareness about the issues. With Rowing Against Slavery, Gadiot was able to raise money for Anti-Slavery International and Save the Children.

Gadiot regularly uses his social media exposure to raise awareness for humanitarian organisations such as Choose Love and Survival International.
