= Edward Curzon, 6th Earl Howe =

British peer (1908–1984)

The Right Honourable The Earl Howe CBE CStJ DL JP
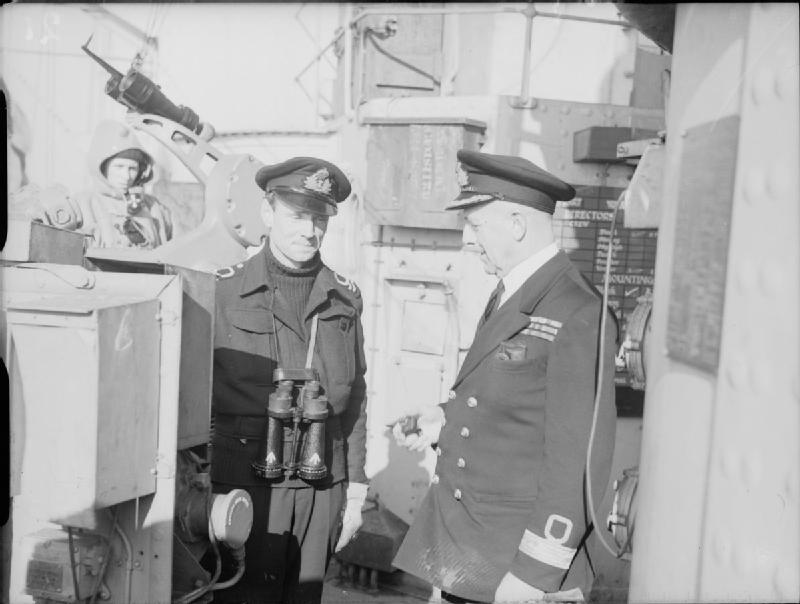
- Lieutenant Viscount Curzon (left) with his father Commodore The Earl Howe, on board HMS Howe.

Member of the House of Lords
- Lord Temporal
- In office 1 September 1964 – 29 May 1984
- Preceded by: The 5th Earl Howe
- Succeeded by: The 7th Earl Howe

Personal details
- Born: Edward Richard Assheton Penn Curzon; 7 August 1908 St George Hanover Square, London, England
- Died: 29 May 1984 (aged 75) Amersham, Buckinghamshire, England
- Spouses: Priscilla Crystal Frances Blundell Weigall (m. 1935; div. 1943) Grace Lilian Barker Wakeling (m. 1946)
- Children: 4
- Parents: Francis Curzon, 5th Earl Howe (father); Mary Curzon, Lady Howe (mother)
- Education: Eton College
- Alma mater: Corpus Christi College, Cambridge
- Awards: Commander of the Most Excellent Order of the British Empire; Officer of the Most Venerable Order of the Hospital of Saint John of Jerusalem; Commander of the Most Venerable Order of the Hospital of Saint John of Jerusalem
- Military career
- Allegiance: United Kingdom
- Branch: Royal Naval Volunteer Reserve
- Service years: 1928–1946
- Rank: Lieutenant Commander
- Commands: HMS Cairo; HMS Howe
- Conflicts: World War II

Edward Richard Assheton Penn Curzon, 6th Earl Howe (7 August 1908 – 29 May 1984), styled Viscount Curzon from 1929 to 1964, was a Royal Navy officer and hereditary peer.

== Early life and background ==
Curzon was born in St George Hanover Square, London, Middlesex, the eldest son of Francis Curzon, 5th Earl Howe, and his wife and first cousin Mary Curzon, Lady Howe.

He was educated at Eton College, and graduated from Corpus Christi College, Cambridge.

== Naval career ==
Curzon joined the London Division of the Royal Naval Volunteer Reserve as a probationary midshipman on 18 September 1928, and was appointed an Acting Sub-Lieutenant on 21 July 1931, receiving promotion to Sub-Lieutenant on 7 November 1932, with seniority from 21 July 1932. He left the RNVR in 1936 or 1937, but returned to RNVR service after the outbreak on the Second World War, being appointed a probationary temporary sub-lieutenant on 23 February 1940. He was promoted to Lieutenant on 20 May 1940, and served aboard the cruiser HMS Cairo from June 1940 to December 1941, then the battleship HMS Howe (named after his illustrious ancestor the first Earl Howe) from May 1942 to July 1945, serving in the rank of acting temporary Lieutenant Commander from December 1943 until April 1944. He left the Navy in April 1946.

== Political career ==
Curzon had an active career in public service. He was a member of the Conservatives. He was first elected Member of the London County Council for Battersea South in 1937, serving until 1946. In November 1940 he was appointed a Sheriff for Buckinghamshire in the King's Bench Division of the High Court of Justice.

His career continued post-war. Curzon was appointed a Justice of the Peace in 1946, and was elected as an Alderman of Buckinghamshire in 1958, and was a County Councillor from 1973, serving as Vice Chairman of Buckinghamshire County Council from 1976. He was appointed a Deputy Lieutenant of Buckinghamshire on 1 February 1960, and was again appointed a Sheriff for Buckinghamshire in the Queen's Bench Division of the High Court of Justice in November 1963.

Curzon succeeded to the title of Earl Howe on 1 September 1964, taking his seat in the House of Lords, and making his maiden speech on 13 December 1965, during a debate on transport issues in Greater London. He was a campaigner for road safety — which did not prevent him from suggesting that the speed limit on motorways should be raised from 70 to 100 mph.

He also served as the President of the South Buckinghamshire Conservative and Unionist Association from 1965 to 1972, then President of the Chesham and Amersham Conservative Association. In addition he served as Commissioner for the St John Ambulance Brigade for Buckinghamshire, 1953–1955, was a Trustee of the King William IV Naval Asylum in Penge. He also served as President of the British Automobile Racing Club, the Institute of Road Safety Officers, and the Fiat Motor Club (Great Britain). He was a Steward and Vice-Chairman of the Royal Automobile Club, a director of Automobile Proprietary Ltd. and Motoring Services Ltd., and a member of the RAC Public Policy Committee, the British Motor Sport Council, and the Royal National Lifeboat Institution Committee of Management. He was an Honorary Fellow of the Institute of Road Transport Engineers.

In 1973 Curzon and his second wife Grace appeared in Nick Broomfield's short film Proud to Be British.

== Awards ==
On 26 June 1953 Curzon was made an Officer of the Most Venerable Order of the Hospital of Saint John of Jerusalem, and was promoted to Commander of the Order on 20 June 1956. He was made a Commander of the Most Excellent Order of the British Empire in the 1961 Birthday Honours for "political and public services in Buckinghamshire".

== Marriages and issue ==
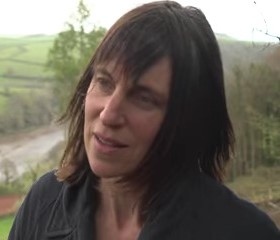
Lord Howe's granddaughter Alice Oswald (pictured 2012)

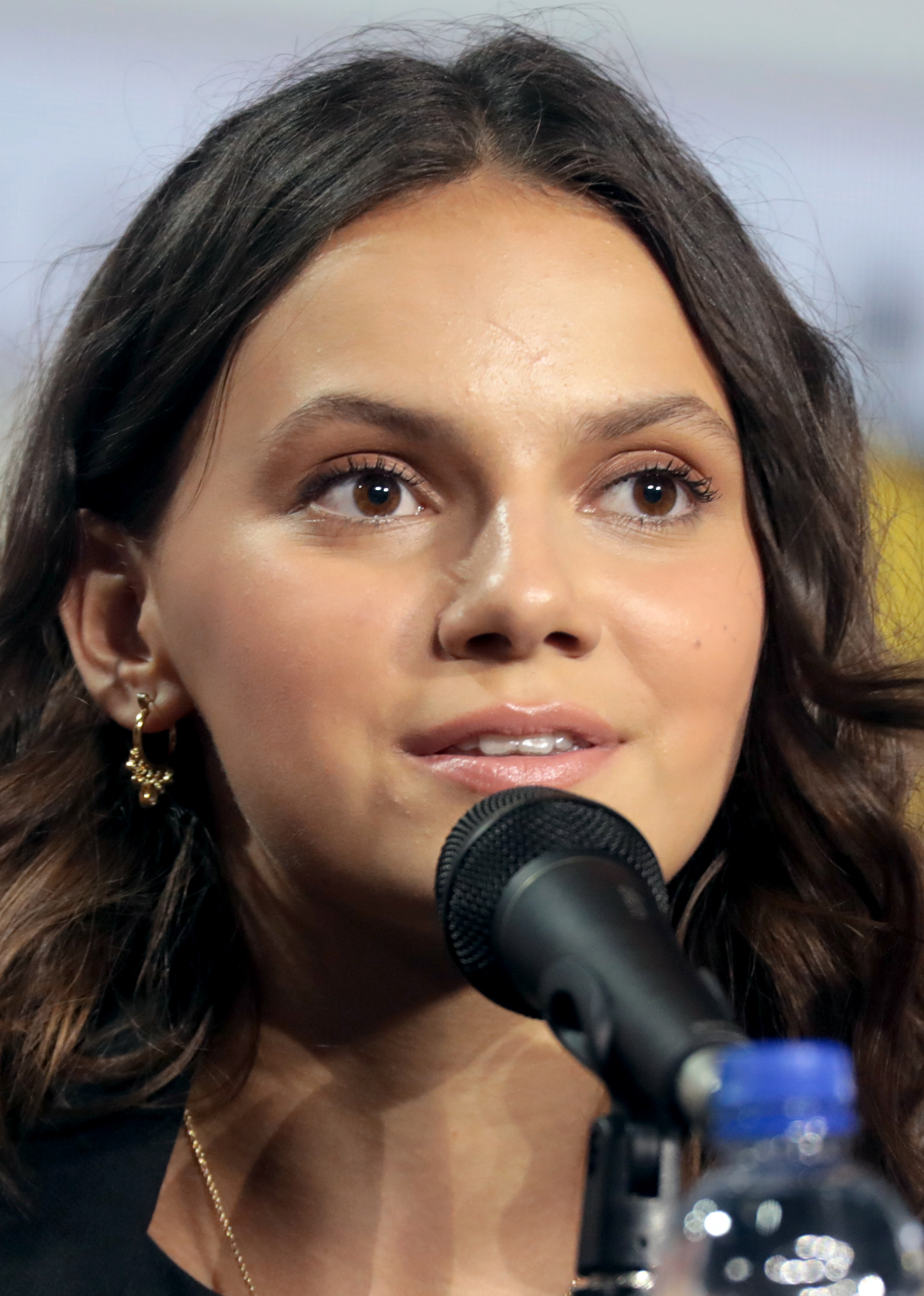
Lord Howe's great-granddaughter, Dafne Keen (pictured 2019)

Lord Howe married firstly, on 23 July 1935, Priscilla Crystal Frances Blundell Weigall, only daughter of Archibald Weigall and his wife Grace Emily Blundell Maple; they were divorced in 1943. They had two daughters:

- Lady Priscilla Mary Rose Curzon (12 February 1940) she married Charles William Lyle Keen, of The Old Rectory, Duntisbourne Rouse, Gloucestershire, on 21 July 1962. They have four children:
  - Laura Mary Catherine (Keen) Beatty (1 May 1963) she married the Hon. Nicholas Beatty (born 1961), son of David Beatty, 2nd Earl Beatty, and his fourth wife Diane Kirk Blundell, on 29 September 1990. They have one son.
  - Eleanor Margaret Keen (4 April 1965)
  - Alice Priscilla Lyle (Keen) Oswald (Reading, Berkshire, 31 August 1966) she married Peter Oswald (born 1965) in 1994 and has three children
  - William Walter Maurice "Will" Keen (Oxford, Oxfordshire, 4 March 1970) he married María Fernández Ache on 10 August 2002. They have one daughter:
    - Dafne Keen Fernández (Madrid, 4 January 2005)
- Lady Jennifer Jane Curzon (12 May 1941) she married Alan Joseph Ponté, son of Captain Leo Ponté, on 6 September 1962. They have five children.

Lord Howe married secondly on 30 April 1946 Grace Lilian Barker Wakeling, daughter of Stephen Frederick Wakeling and wife Mary Anna Hartley Tarr, paternal granddaughter of Lt Edward French Wakeling and wife Susannah Greygoose and maternal granddaughter of Cornelius John Tarr and wife Grace Hannah Davies, who were both born in South Africa. They had two daughters:

- Lady Mary-Gaye Curzon (21 February 1947) she married firstly Kevin Esmond Peter Cooper-Key on 18 December 1971; they were divorced in 1976. They have one daughter. She married secondly John Anstruther-Gough-Calthorpe on 27 May 1977; they were divorced in 1986. They have three children. She married thirdly Old Harrovian entrepreneur Jeffrey Bonas, son of Harry George Bonas (b. Coventry, West Midlands) and wife Winifred Hodgkins. They married in 1988 and they were divorced in 1994. They have one daughter. She married fourthly Christopher Shaw of Clan Shaw of Tordarroch on 17 December 1996 and were divorced. They had no issue.
  - Pandora Lorna Mary Cooper-Key (16 March 1973), she married Matthew Mervyn-Jones in 2006.
  - Georgiana Moireach Gay Anstruther-Gough-Calthorpe (14 October 1978), she married Robert Butler.
  - Isabella Amaryllis Charlotte Anstruther-Gough-Calthorpe (3 March 1980), she married Sam Branson, son of Sir Richard Branson and first wife Kristen Tomassi, on 6 March 2013.
  - Jacobi Richard Penn Anstruther-Gough-Calthorpe (10 May 1983)
  - Cressida Curzon (Bonas) Wentworth-Stanley (18 February 1989), she was the onetime girlfriend of Prince Harry, the younger son of King Charles III. She married Harry Wentworth-Stanley, son of Nicholas Wentworth-Stanley and Clare Mountbatten, Marchioness of Milford Haven, on 25 July 2020.
- Lady Charlotte Elizabeth Anne Curzon (5 July 1948 – 11 January 2019). She married John Barry Dinan in 1988. They have one son:
  - Richard Assheton Dermot Dinan (October 1986)

== Succession ==
He was succeeded in the earldom by his second cousin, Frederick Curzon, 7th Earl Howe, who sits in the House of Lords by virtue of his life peerage granted in the 2026 political peerages. The 7th earl formerly sat as an elected hereditary peer.

Peerage of the United Kingdom
Preceded by Francis Curzon	Earl Howe; 2nd creation 1964–1984; Member of the House of Lords (1964–1984)	Succeeded by Frederick Curzon
Preceded by Francis Curzon	Viscount Curzon; 1964–1984	Succeeded by Frederick Curzon
Peerage of Great Britain
Preceded by Francis Curzon	Baron Curzon; 1964–1984	Succeeded by Frederick Curzon
Preceded by Francis Curzon	Baron Howe; 1964–1984	Succeeded by Frederick Curzon
