= Isabella Calthorpe =

English socialite, actress and model (born 1980)

- Born: Isabella Amaryllis Charlotte Anstruther-Gough-Calthorpe; 3 March 1980 (age 46); Winchester, Hampshire, England
- Education: Bradfield College; University of Edinburgh; London Academy of Music and Dramatic Art
- Occupations: Actress; model
- Years active: 2004–present
- Spouse: Sam Branson (m. 2013)
- Children: 2
- Parents: John Anstruther-Gough-Calthorpe; Lady Mary-Gaye Curzon
- Relatives: Gabriella Calthorpe (paternal half-sister); Cressida Bonas (maternal half-sister); Sir Richard Branson (father-in-law); Edward Curzon, 6th Earl Howe (maternal grandfather)

Isabella Amaryllis Charlotte Branson (née Anstruther-Gough-Calthorpe; born 3 March 1980) is an English socialite, actress and model.

== Early life ==
Isabella Amaryllis Charlotte Calthorpe, known by intimates as Bellie, was born on 3 March 1980 in Royal Hampshire County Hospital in Winchester. She is the daughter of John Anstruther-Gough-Calthorpe and Lady Mary-Gaye Georgiana Lorna Curzon. Her paternal grandfather is Brigadier Sir Richard Anstruther-Gough-Calthorpe, 2nd Baronet and her maternal grandfather is Edward Curzon, 6th Earl Howe.

She has two full siblings (elder sister Georgiana, an artist, and younger brother Jacobi), and four half-siblings: two from her father's second marriage, including actress Gabriella Calthorpe; one from her mother's first marriage; and one from her mother's third marriage, the actress Cressida Bonas.

Calthorpe was educated at Heathfield School, Ascot, and Bradfield College, before going on to study Classics and Art History at the University of Edinburgh.

== Career ==
After attending the London Academy of Music and Dramatic Art from 2003 to 2005, she became a stage actress. She has also appeared in films Stage Beauty and How to Lose Friends & Alienate People, and the television series Harley Street and Trinity.

=== Filmography ===
Year	Title	Role	Notes
2004	Stage Beauty	Lady Jane Bellamy	
2006	The Inspector Lynley Mysteries	Emily Proctor	Episode: Chinese Walls
2008	Harley Street	Miranda Cost	episodes 1 and 2
2008	How to Lose Friends & Alienate People	Anna	
2009	Trinity	Rosalind Gaudain	8 episodes
2009	The Prisoner	765 – Wonkers	2 episodes, "Episode 1: Arrival" and "Episode 2: Harmony"
2010	13Hrs	Sarah Tyler	(released as "Night Wolf" in the USA)
2011	Blooded	Liv Scott	feature directed by Ed Boase
2013	Fedz	Detective Carter	

== Personal life ==
While single, she appeared regularly in the society pages of Tatler, Harper's Bazaar and Hello!

On 6 March 2013, she married Sam Branson, filmmaker, former model, and son of business tycoon Sir Richard Branson. The couple married at his father's private safari lodge near Kruger National Park, with guests including Princess Beatrice of York and Princess Eugenie of York.

The couple's first child, a daughter named Eva Deia Branson, was born on 19 February 2015. They had their second child, a son named Bluey Rafe Richard Branson, on 18 January 2017.
