= Sir Richard Anstruther-Gough-Calthorpe, 2nd Baronet =

British Army officer (1908–1985)

Brigadier Sir Richard Hamilton Anstruther-Gough-Calthorpe, 2nd Baronet, CBE, JP, DL (28 March 1908 – 7 February 1985) was a British Army officer.

In 1939 he was attached to the Royal Scots Greys as a captain, where he became engaged in June. He was married in early July 1939 to Nancy Malcolmson at St Margaret's, Westminster, London. As well as Commander of the Order of the British Empire, he was awarded the Croix de Guerre.

With his father, he enjoyed sailing and golf.

He served as Deputy Director of Military Operations (A), War Office, from 1944 to 1947.

British property developer John Anstruther-Gough-Calthorpe is his son.

Baronetage of the United Kingdom
Preceded by Fitzroy Anstruther-Gough-Calthorpe	Baronet (of Elvetham Hall); 1957–1985	Succeeded by Euan Hamilton Anstruther-Gough-Calthorpe
