= The Liberal =

Magazine

- Type: 'Poetry, Politics, Culture'
- Owner(s): The Liberal Publications, Ltd.
- Editor: Benjamin Ramm
- Founded: December 2004
- Ceased publication: 2009 (print)
- Website: www.theliberal.co.uk

The Liberal was a London-based magazine "dedicated to promoting liberalism around the world", which ran in print from 2004 to 2009 and online until 2012. The publication explored liberal attitudes to a range of cultural issues, and encouraged a dialogue between liberal politics and the liberal arts. Ideologically, The Liberal challenged the concept of 'liberalisms', arguing for the continuity of the liberal tradition, which finds its modern expression in social liberalism.

The title claimed a lineage with The Liberal, a short-lived periodical founded in 1822 by the Romantic poets Percy Bysshe Shelley, Lord Byron and Leigh Hunt. The modern version was launched in July 2004 ‒ 180 years after the original ceased publication ‒ "to rehabilitate Romantic Liberalism and reinvigorate the public sphere".

Contributors to the print edition included Harold Bloom, Helen Suzman, Christopher Hitchens, Germaine Greer, Garry Kasparov, Robert Reich, Julia Kristeva, Liu Xiaobo, Johann Hari, Martin Rees, Wole Soyinka, Clive James, Slavoj Žižek and Simon Sebag Montefiore.
