= Lady Mary-Gaye Curzon =

British model, socialite and debutante (born 1947)

- Born: Mary-Gaye Georgiana Lorna Curzon; 21 February 1947 (age 79)
- Spouses: Esmond Cooper-Key (m. 1971; div. 1976) John Anstruther-Gough-Calthorpe (m. 1977; div. 1986) Jeffrey Bonas (m. 1988; div. 1994) Christopher Shaw (m. 1996; div. 2000)
- Children: 5; including Isabella Calthorpe and Cressida Bonas
- Parents: Edward Curzon, 6th Earl Howe (father); Grace Wakeling (mother)

Lady Mary-Gaye Georgiana Lorna Curzon (born 21 February 1947) is a British model, socialite and debutante.

== Early life ==
Curzon was born on 21 February 1947 to Edward Curzon, Viscount Curzon, later 6th Earl Howe, and his second wife Grace Lilian Barker Wakeling. From birth, she was styled as The Honourable Mary-Gaye Curzon by courtesy and became Lady Mary-Gaye Curzon when her father inherited the earldom of Howe in 1964.

A popular socialite and debutante in the 1960s, Curzon was known as the "it girl" of London society. She had a blue cocktail named after her at Claridge's. She worked as a model and sales girl at Harrods. In 1967, she appeared smeared in motor oil and apparently topless in Birds of Britain, a pin-up coffee table book featuring Sarah Miles, Julie Christie and Lulu. The motor oil in reference to her grandfather, the 5th Earl Howe, a famous racing car driver. She also modeled for society photographer Lord Lichfield, including in one group portrait titled "'Out’ Group", which also featured politician Jonathan Aitken, TV presenter Cathy McGowan and author David Benedictus. It hangs today in the permanent collection of the National Portrait Gallery, London.

== Marriages and family ==
Curzon has been married and divorced four times, and has five children from her first three husbands. She married her first husband, Esmond Cooper-Key, son of Neill Cooper-Key and grandson of Esmond Harmsworth, 2nd Viscount Rothermere, in 1971. They had a daughter Pandora Lorna Mary Cooper-Key (1973–2024). Curzon and Cooper-Key's marriage ended in divorce in 1976.

On 27 May 1977, she married her second husband, John Anstruther-Gough-Calthorpe, at Chelsea Town Hall. They had three children, Georgiana Anstruther-Gough-Calthorpe, Isabella Anstruther-Gough-Calthorpe and Jacobi Anstruther-Gough-Calthorpe, before divorcing in 1986.

Following her divorce from Anstruther-Gough-Calthorpe, she married her third husband, entrepreneur Jeffrey Bonas, in 1988. They had one daughter, Cressida Bonas, in 1989. Cressida was the onetime girlfriend of Prince Harry. Curzon and Bonas were divorced in 1994.

She married her fourth husband, financier Christopher Shaw, on 17 December 1996 at Hinton Ampner, Shaw's home in Hampshire. They had no children and were divorced in 2000. Shaw died by suicide in 2014 following a diagnosis with kidney disease.
