= Cressida Bonas =

English actress and model (born 1989)

- Born: Cressida Curzon Bonas; 18 February 1989 (age 37); Winchester, Hampshire, England, UK
- Education: Royal Ballet School; University of Leeds; Trinity Laban Conservatoire
- Occupations: Actress; model
- Years active: 2009–2020
- Spouse: Harry Wentworth-Stanley (m. 2020)
- Children: 2
- Mother: Lady Mary-Gaye Curzon
- Relatives: Edward Curzon, 6th Earl Howe (maternal grandfather); Isabella Calthorpe (maternal half-sister); Clare Mountbatten, Marchioness of Milford Haven (mother-in-law); Sir Winston Churchill (first cousin three times removed)

Cressida Curzon Bonas (born 18 February 1989) is an English actress and model.

== Early life and education ==
Bonas was born in Winchester, Hampshire, the only child of 1960s "it girl" Lady Mary-Gaye Georgiana Lorna Curzon (daughter of the 6th Earl Howe's second marriage) and her third husband, Old Harrovian entrepreneur Jeffrey Bonas. The Bonas family, once grocers and butchers, also owned textile mills in Castle Gresley and Burton-on-Trent; they constructed looms for their own use, and subsequently manufactured them for sale to other companies. The "Bonas Brothers" company closed operations in the 1980s, having produced, as its final line, elastic for women's tights.

She has seven half-siblings: three paternal half-brothers from her father's first marriage; one maternal half-sister from her mother's first marriage; and two maternal half-sisters and a maternal half-brother from her mother's second marriage, including actress Isabella Calthorpe.

Bonas studied ballet from the age of nine at the Royal Ballet School. Later, Bonas won a sports scholarship to Prior Park College in Bath, Somerset, then completed her formal education at Stowe School. She went on to study dance at the University of Leeds, graduating with a 2:1, before undertaking postgraduate dance studies at the Trinity Laban Conservatoire in Greenwich.

== Career ==
Whilst at school, Bonas played Cockney housekeeper Mrs. Swabb in Alan Bennett's Habeas Corpus, Miss Julie in the eponymous play, and Laura in Tennessee Williams's The Glass Menagerie.

She made her first screen appearance in 2009 with a small role in the TV series Trinity. Her theatrical debut came in 2014 at Hay Festival in the play There's a Monster in the Lake. The play was also staged at the Vault Festival in January 2015. In May and June 2015, Bonas appeared as Laura in the one-woman play, An Evening with Lucian Freud, by Laura-Jane Foley, at the Leicester Square Theatre, directed by Ella Marchment. Jane Shilling in The Daily Telegraph praised the "charm and energy of Bonas's performance". In June 2014, Bonas appeared in the film Tulip Fever (2015) as Mrs. Steen. In December 2016 and January 2017, Bonas played the female lead role of Daisy Buchanan in the musical play Gatsby, at the Leicester Square Theatre, based on F. Scott Fitzgerald's The Great Gatsby. In 2020, she played Sheila Caffell in White House Farm, a British television series about the 1985 White House Farm murders.

Bonas was photographed by Mario Testino for Vanity Fair after being included in the magazine's annual "International Best-Dressed List" in 2014. In January 2015, after modelling for British brand Burberry, Bonas was announced to front the 2015 campaign of fashion company Mulberry. Her work for the brand includes a two-minute-long advertisement released in March that co-stars actor Freddie Fox.

== Personal life ==
Bonas has been called an "it girl". She was introduced to Prince Harry by her close friend Princess Eugenie in May 2012. The couple were in a relationship for two years, leading to speculation in the British press that the two would eventually marry. On 30 April 2014, the couple was reported to have separated amicably. In May 2018, she was a guest at the wedding of Prince Harry and Meghan Markle.

On 18 August 2019, Bonas's engagement to real estate agent and property investor Henry David (Harry) Wentworth-Stanley (born 1989) was announced via a post on his Instagram page. Wentworth-Stanley is the son of Nicholas Philip Wentworth-Stanley, of a Hertfordshire landed gentry family, and his first wife, Clare Husted (née Steel), former social editor for Tatler magazine, is now wife of George Mountbatten, 4th Marquess of Milford Haven.

On 25 July 2020, Bonas and Harry married, during a small window of regulated opportunity, between national Covid lockdowns. They held a small private ceremony, celebrating their nuptials with 30 guests, in West Sussex.

In July 2022, she confirmed her first pregnancy in The Spectator magazine. In November 2022, she was spotted pushing her newborn son, Wilbur James Wentworth-Stanley, in a pram. In a December 2022 interview, she revealed that she had undergone in vitro fertilisation (IVF) after struggling to conceive.

In January 2025, it was announced that Bonas was pregnant with the couple's second child using frozen embryo from her earlier IVF treatment. In June 2025, the couple welcomed their second child, a daughter named Delphina Pandora Wentworth-Stanley. Bonas paid tribute to her late older half-sister, Pandora Cooper-Key, who died in July 2024 after a 24-year cancer battle, by naming her daughter in her honour.

== Selected credits ==
=== Theatre ===
Year	Play	Role	Venue	Notes
2014; 2015	There's a Monster in the Lake	Wolf	Hay Festival; Vault Festival	;
2015	The Importance of Being Earnest	Cecily Cardew	The London Oratory School	
2015	An Evening with Lucian Freud	Laura	Leicester Square Theatre, London	
2016–2017	The Great Gatsby	Daisy Buchanan	Leicester Square Theatre, London	
2017	Mrs. Orwell	Sonia Orwell	Old Red Lion Theatre, London	

=== Film and television ===
Year	Title	Role	Notes
2009	Trinity	Cheerleader	
2016	Doctor Thorne	Patience Oriel	
2017	The Bye Bye Man	Sasha	
2017	Tulip Fever	Mrs. Steen	
2020	White House Farm	Sheila Caffell	
