= Benjamin Ramm =

Benjamin Ramm FRSA (born 12 June 1982) is a writer and journalist for the BBC and openDemocracy. He is former editor of The Liberal magazine. He is the founder of the eco-community Honeydew.

In December 2005, as editor of The Liberal, Ramm organised a "Kennedy Must Go" campaign to unseat Liberal Democrat party leader Charles Kennedy. After the formation of the UK coalition government in 2010, Ramm argued that the party provided cover – as "the cloak that hides the dagger" – for policies that damaged liberalism. He criticized the coalition on spending cuts, the reforms to the NHS, civil liberties, the rise in VAT, and the increase in tuition fees.

In May 2011, he published the pamphlet Citizens: A Manifesto, featuring endorsements from Naomi Wolf, Philip Pullman, Ariel Dorfman and Peter Tatchell.

Ramm is editor-at-large of openDemocracy. He presents documentaries for BBC Radio 4 and the BBC World Service, and is a regular feature writer for BBC Culture.
