= Claude Duval (disambiguation) =

Claude Duval (1643–1670) was a French-born gentleman highwayman in post-Restoration Britain.

Claude Duval may also refer to:

- Claude B. Duval (1914–1986), Louisiana state senator
- Claude Duval (racehorse), a competitor who finished fourth in the 1843 Grand National
- Claude Duval (painting), an 1860 work by William Powell Frith
- Claude Duval (opera), an 1881 comic opera by Edward Solomon and Henry Pottinger Stephens
- Claude Duval (film), a 1924 silent film
