= Thomas Baker (Arundel MP) =

17th-century English politician

Thomas Baker (died 1625), of Whittingham Hall in Fressingfield, Suffolk and Leyton, Essex, was an English politician.

== Early life ==
Baker was the son of Sir Richard Baker (d. 1594), MP for Lancaster, Horsham, New Shoreham and New Romney, and his first wife, Katherine Tyrrell, the daughter of Sir John Tirrell and stepdaughter of Sir William Petre.

His father was the eldest son of Sir John Baker, Chancellor of the Exchequer and, his second wife, Elizabeth Dineley. His paternal uncle was John, and one of his aunts, Cecily Baker, was the wife of Thomas Sackville, Lord Buckhurst.

== Career ==
He was a Member of Parliament (MP) for Arundel in 1601.

== Personal life ==
He married Constance Kingsmill, a daughter of William Kingsmill.
