= Holt Hotel =

Holt Hotel may refer to:

- Holt Hotel (Oxfordshire) -hotel in Oxfordshire, England, said to be haunted by the notorious highwayman Claude Du Vall
- Holt Hotel (Iceland) - a hotel in the Icelandic capital of Reykjavík

== See also ==
- Holte Hotel, part of the Villa Park complex, Birmingham, England
