= Daniel Pulteney (MP from Bramber) =

British politician and academic

Daniel Pulteney (bap. 19 September 1749 – 24 July 1811) was a British Pittite politician and academic who sat in the House of Commons for Bramber between 1784 and 1788 on the interest of the Duke of Rutland. A native of Somerset, Pulteney embarked on his short political career on account of his financial debts, aiming to avoid creditors and gain a lucrative sinecure appointment.

== Early life ==
Pulteney was the eldest son the Rev. Charles Pulteney and his wife Betty Speke, whose relative George Speke the father-in-law of Lord North, acted as trustee of the marriage settlement. Pulteney was the eldest of three sons and one daughter born to the couple who resided in the parish of Curry Mallet, Somerset. Pulteney was baptised on 19 September 1749. He entered Eton College as a King's Scholar, remaining in education there until 1769. While several other individuals with the same surname did serve in the House of Commons during the 18th-century including another Daniel, Pulteney was likely unrelated to the notable Pulteney that included the Patriot Whig leader William Pulteney.

== Academic career ==
Thereafter Pulteney was admitted as a scholar at King's College, Cambridge in 1769 from which he graduated with a Bachelor of Arts in 1773. Prior to graduating Pulteney became a Fellow of King's, a position he would hold until his death. Pulteney did not appear to be a teaching fellow, yet would later serve twice a Vice-Provost at King's from 1798 to 1801 and 1803–10, while also serving a period as Dean between 1801 and 1803. Pulteney's academic lifestyle while residing in Cambridge can be ascertained from the memoirs of Henry Gunning, as referenced by Lewis Namier who noted:

There were a few men amongst the Masters of Arts of pretty high standing, who cultivated the acquaintance of the young nobility, and contrived to keep a handsome establishment, and live in a very expensive style, without any other apparent resources than their fellowships. Two of the most celebrated (I was very near using the word notorious) were Akehurst and Pulteney, both Fellows of King's. At a dinner given by the Bishop of Llandaff to the Duke of Rutland and some other young men of rank, the Bishop was pressed by Akehurst to take a seat at a table where there was a vacancy, and at which they had been playing for very high stakes. This was the very significant answer of the Bishop,- "I have no estate to lose, Sir; I am not desirous of winning one."

Pulteney resided in Cambridge during the 1770s, during which period he was admitted as a student of the Middle Temple in 1772, after which he was called to the bar over fifteen-years later in 1788. While at Cambridge he took the acquaintance and became a friend of the 4th Duke of Rutland, with Pulteney referring to Rutland as 'Dearest Granby'. Pulteney officially retired from academic work as a 'College officer' in 1794 at the age of forty-five. In his earlier years he seldom partook in college meetings and Congregations, with his being reported absent at all such meetings during the years 1772-5 and 1782-93.

== Political career ==
Pulteney's politics first became apparent at the contest for the Cambridge University constituency during the 1780 general election. He cast his votes in that election for the two victorious candidates in the University constituency, Northite-aligned James Mansfield and Rockinghamite-aligned Lord John Townshend, and against Pitt the Younger. This created a near breach with his friend Rutland, leading Pulteney to intone in a December 1782 letter reproduced by Namier that: "I was then honored with by your Grace have done me injury in your opinion; but except in the Cambridge election where I was pre-engaged, I have never acted contrary to your wishes". Pulteney by this period had found his personal financial situation strained and within a year informed Rutland that creditors were due to execute writs against him on account of his dire financial situation. Pulteney's desire for a parliamentary seat was expressed in a letter to Rutland, dated 7 November 1783, written at Southampton where Pulteney appeared to be considering fleeing to France to avoid his creditors. The letter, quoted by Namier, sees Pulteney expressed that:

A bare existence in England out of a jail by means of Parliament is, I assure your Grace, no object with me in my present circumstances. I should endeavour to make myself as usefull [sic] as I could there to Pitt for half a year or a year, and in the meantime settle as well as I could all my affairs, and I then think the being thus patronized by your Grace, together with Lord Chatham's and perhaps Pitt's own good wishes, might get me some appointment to the East Indies. I should by this means leave your Grace's borough open for any of your Grace's friends, and perhaps stand some chance of repaying your Grace a sum which I am sensible is a considerable object with the greatest estate...

Receiving an assurance from Rutland, Pulteney was suggested as a potential candidate in either of the Looe constituencies or Newton in Lancashire, yet with the early dissolution for the 1784 general election Pulteney was returned pro-Pitt candidate for the notorious rotten borough of Bramber in Sussex. Despite entering the Commons with the aim of receiving a sinecure in the Indies, he devoted himself to sending a series of sketches of parliamentarians and their activities to his benefactor in Dublin, who was serving by this point as Lord Lieutenant of Ireland. Pulteney's parliamentary sketches make particular reference to MPs linked to the Foxite and Northite faction of the Coalition in opposition. Pulteney's personal politics seems to mirror those of conservative elements among the Coalition opposition which included several conservative and former-Tories in their ranks.

Pulteney would note to his benefactor at the steadily decreasing strength of the opposition under Charles James Fox which was termed by the Bramber MP as "the poor forlorn minority" which "seemed at last to join in the laugh at their ridiculous situation". Pulteney considered the government's support in the Commons to be firm and to have remained intact despite some disquiet over government measures from other backbenchers. In the Commons Pulteney, like other Members pledged to the Duke of Rutland, defended the interests and positions of the Duke, which was alluded to in Pulteney's maiden speech to the Commons, given on 8 June 1784, where he listed various constituencies in the pocket of the Duke. Pulteney himself wrote to Rutland, as quoted by Namier, that:

I rose and spoke for ten minutes, ... not knowing what was to question before the House. I took care, however, to get into no scrape ... but I certainly felt no more embarrassment than in a private room, and will venture to assure your Grace that you cannot employ any of your Members who will more readily speak on the Turnpike Bills of Leicestershire, Cambridgeshire, Grantham, Newark, Scarborough, or Bramber, whenever such business is before the House. ... Fox who followed me ... has declared at Brooks's, he wondered only at my want of embarrassment and want of information. ... I am perfectly ready to execute all the minor business your Grace will direct me to do.

Along with other Members aligned to the Duke of Rutland, Pulteney voted appeared vaguely supportive of parliamentary reform measures introduced by Pitt, yet he also expressed his personal misgivings about certain aspects of Pitt's India Act, though he did not allow this criticism to become opposition to Pitt or his government. Pulteney voted with the opposition in 1785 on the question of the Westminster election of 1784. He continued to strive for a sinecure and a resolution to his financial woes, continuing to write to Rutland and ask for a sinecure of £400 per annum. By 1786 the Duke was paying Pulteney himself this sum and continued to look for means to finally gain Pulteney office. Rutland died suddenly on 24 October 1787 leaving Pulteney's financial well-being and political career up in the air. Pulteney remained a Member of Parliament until December 1788 when he finally gained office as Collector of customs in Dominica. Pulteney does not appear to have traveled to the island, likely leaving his duties to a deputy. Were he to have taken up the office, Pulteney would have had to resign his Fellowship at King's, which he continued to hold thereafter.

== Later life ==
Pulteney resigned his seat in December 1788, by which time he seemed a possible defection to the Foxite grouping in Parliament. He was succeeded in a by-election on 15 December 1788 by Robert Hobart. Pulteney returned to Cambridge after his period in the Commons and from 1794 onward he to attend college meetings and Congregation far more frequently than he had before. Pulteney retired in 1794, yet maintained residence in Cambridge all while refusing to serve as a tutor and having an income of £3 per annum from his position as second dean of arts.

Pulteney was a lifelong bachelor and did not have any recorded progeny. His final will, dated 8 October 1810 left a legacy to his younger brother, Dr. Charles Speke Pulteney, whom the elder Pulteney had lost contact with thirty years prior. Pulteney died at age sixty-one from apoplexy at the Rainbow Coffee House situated in London and was buried in King's College Chapel, Cambridge.

Pulteney's short political career was motivated mainly by his desire to avoid creditors, with his time in Parliament coming to a close upon his appointment to a government sinecure that he had desired. Namier in writing on Pulteney's life and short political career considered him to be an intelligent and astute individual, terming him 'An Ordinary Man' in the House of Commons during the period. Namier, however summed Pulteney up, writing that he was:

A parasite throughout, he had sensed and recorded during his short parliamentary career the change that was coming over British politics.

Parliament of Great Britain
Preceded by Henry Fitzroy Stanhope; Sir Henry Gough	Member of Parliament for Bramber; 1784 - 1788; With: Sir Henry Gough	Succeeded by Robert Hobart; Sir Henry Gough
