= Baron Hawley =

Title in the Peerage of Ireland

Baron Hawley, of Donsmore, was a title in the Peerage of Ireland. It was created on 8 July 1646 for Sir Francis Hawley, 1st Baronet, a supporter of Charles I. He had already been created a baronet, of Buckland in the County of Somerset, in the Baronetage of England in 1644. He was succeeded by his grandson, also Francis, who served as Member of Parliament for Bramber, Sussex between 1713 and 1715. The latter's son, Francis, the third Baron, was Governor of Antigua. The titles became extinct on the death of the fourth Baron in 1790.

== Barons Hawley (1646) ==
- Francis Hawley, 1st Baron Hawley (c. 1608–1684)
  - Hon. Francis Hawley
- Francis Hawley, 2nd Baron Hawley (c. 1673–1743)
- Francis Hawley, 3rd Baron Hawley (died 1772)
- Samuel Hawley, 4th Baron Hawley (c. 1719–1790)
