= Steeple Aston =

Village in Oxfordshire, England

Coordinates: 51.928°N 1.309°W

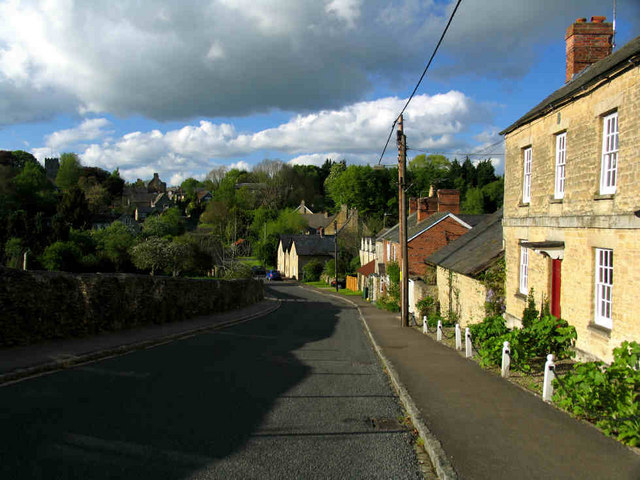
- Paines Hill, Steeple Aston

- Location within Oxfordshire
- Area: 4.35 km^{2} (1.68 sq mi)
- Population: 947 (2011 Census)
  - Density: 218/km^{2} (560/sq mi)
- OS grid reference: SP4725
- Civil parish: Steeple Aston
- District: Cherwell
- Shire county: Oxfordshire
- Region: South East
- Country: England
- Sovereign state: United Kingdom
- Post town: Bicester
- Postcode district: OX25
- Dialling code: 01869
- Police: Thames Valley
- Fire: Oxfordshire
- Ambulance: South Central
- UK Parliament: Banbury
- Website: Steeple Aston oxfordshire

Steeple Aston is a village and civil parish on the edge of the Cherwell Valley, in the Cherwell District of Oxfordshire, England, about 12 miles (19 km) north of Oxford, 7 miles (11 km) west of Bicester, and 10 miles (16 km) south of Banbury. The 2011 Census recorded the parish population as 947. The village is 108 metres (354 ft) above sea level. The River Cherwell and Oxford Canal pass 1 mile (2 km) east of the village. The river forms part of the eastern boundary of the parish. The parish's southern boundary, 1/2 mile (800 m) south of the village, also forms part of Cherwell District's boundary with West Oxfordshire.

== History ==
The earliest evidence of occupation in the area is an Iron Age burial site in the west of the parish near Hopcroft's Holt. The Domesday Book of 1086 records Steeple Aston as Estone, derived from East Tun meaning "east village". By 1220 it was Stipelestun, with the "steeple" prefix probably referring to the church tower. The Domesday Book of 1086 records that Odo, Bishop of Bayeux was overlord of the manor of Steeple Aston.

The Holt Hotel at Hopcroft's Holt, about 1 mile (1.6 km) southwest of the village on the A4260 main road began as a coaching inn in 1475. It was frequented by the 17th century highwayman Claude Duval who is said to haunt it. In 1754 the licensee and his wife at Hopcroft's Holt were murdered. In 1774 the inn at Hopcroft's Holt was called the King's Arms. The village has several 17th-century buildings from the Great Rebuilding of England. The School formerly occupied a building in North Side built in 1640. Next to it are Radcliffe's Almshouses which Brasenose College founded in the 1660s. In South Side, Grange Cottage is early 17th century and Manor Farm House is late 17th century.

== Church and chapel ==
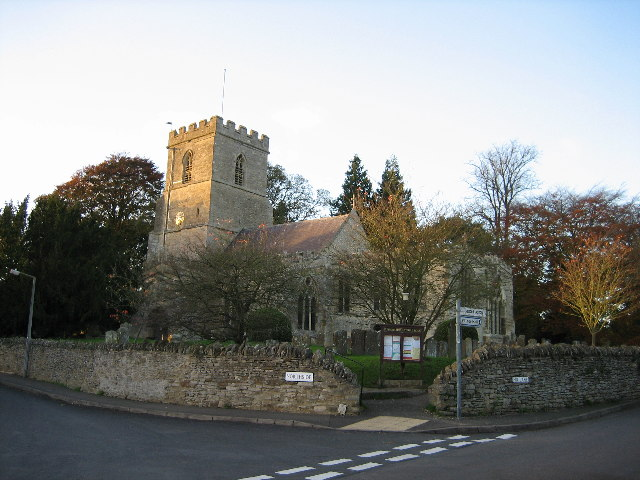
Parish church of SS Peter & Paul

The Church of England parish church of Saints Peter and Paul is 13th century, with subsequent Perpendicular Gothic alterations, and the architect John Plowman restored it in 1842. The parish church is the source of the Steeple Aston Cope, an important piece of 14th-century embroidery now on loan to the Victoria and Albert Museum in London.

The church tower has a ring of eight bells. Richard Keene of Burford cast the three oldest bells in 1674 and 1675. A further bell was cast in 1700 by one of the Chandler family of bell-founders from Drayton Parslow in Buckinghamshire. Two bells were added in the 19th century cast by the Whitechapel Bell Foundry: one cast by Thomas Mears II in 1827 and the other, the present tenor, cast by Mears and Stainbank in 1879. This completed a ring of six bells, with the smallest of the Keene bells being the treble. In 1986 the Whitechapel Bell Foundry cast two slightly smaller bells which were added as a new treble and second bell, increasing the ring to eight. St Peter and St Paul also has a Sanctus bell, cast in 1701 by Henry Bagley II, who had foundries in the Northamptonshire villages of Chacombe and Ecton.

Steeple Aston had a small number of recusants in the 16th, 17th and 18th centuries and a small number of Quakers in the 17th century. Methodist meetings were held in the home of one of the villagers for a few years early in the 19th century but had ceased by 1817. Meetings were held in 1838 and 1839 to hear Primitive Methodist preachers and were well-attended despite uproarious organised protests. A Methodist chapel in South Street was opened in 1852. It was used for worship until 1968 when it was converted into a private residence.

== Governance ==
Steeple Aston has a parish council that meets monthly in the village hall. The village forms part of The Astons and The Heyfords ward of Cherwell District Council and has two councillors. For Oxfordshire County Council the village is in the Deddington ward. The parish is in the Banbury Parliamentary constituency.

== Transport ==
Steeple Aston lies east of the A4260 road between Banbury and Oxford. To the east it is linked with Bicester by the B4030. About 1 mile (1.6 km) south-east of the village is Heyford railway station providing a rail link to Banbury, Oxford and Birmingham. The nearest motorway access is via junctions 9 or 10 of the M40.

== Amenities ==
Steeple Aston village has one public house. The Red Lion opened in 1903 and is controlled by Hook Norton Brewery. It previously had another pub, The White Lion, which opened in 1870. There is also The Holt Hotel public house on the edge of the parish on the A4260 main road about 1 mile (1.6 km) southwest of the village. The village has a village shop and post office, school, pre-school, village hall, and a sports and recreation club and sports pitch. Annual parish events include the Whit Races, and the spring and summer flower shows. A mobile library also calls at the village on alternate Thursdays.

The Steeple Aston Players used to be an amateur dramatic group that regularly performed plays in the village hall. Steeple Aston Village Archive (SAVA) holds annual talks and exhibitions and has produced CDs and books, all on the subject of the village's history. In September 2013, SAVA moved into its new Village History Centre adjacent to the Village Hall, which is open every Saturday morning or by appointment. Steeple Aston Cricket Club is an inclusive village side with players aged between 10 and 59, playing against surrounding villages. In the last ten years, the club has won two thirds of its matches. In 1988 parts of the village were designated a conservation area. On the edge of the village was the narrow-gauge Beeches Light Railway owned by Adrian Shooter.

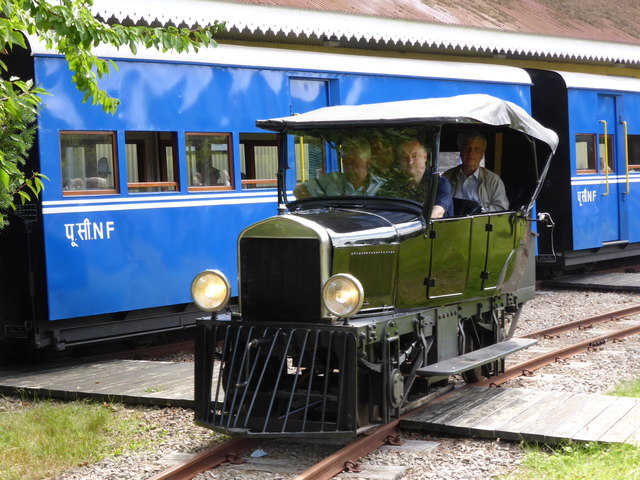
Ford Model T on Beeches Light Railway

== Education ==
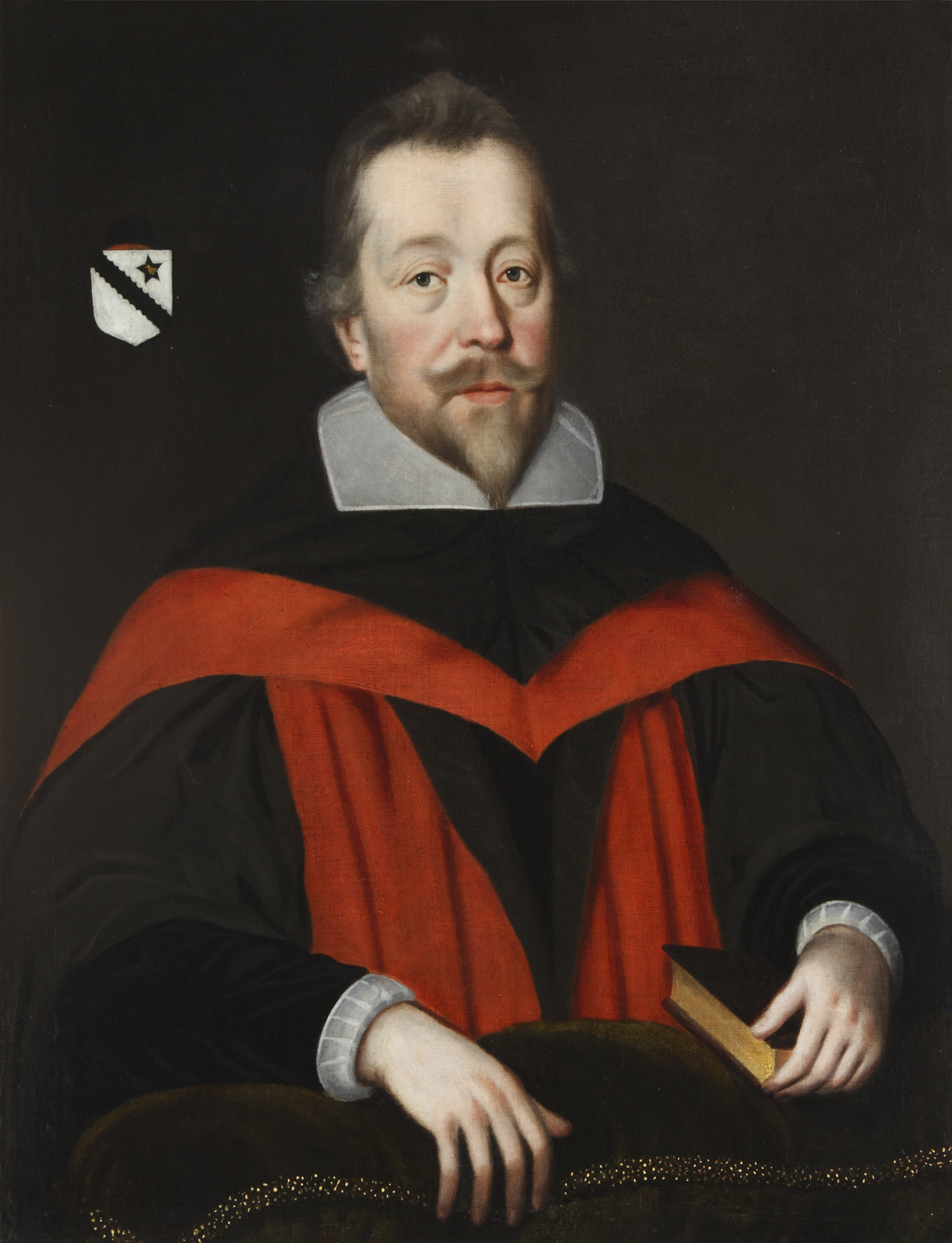
Samuel Radcliffe, principal of Brasenose College, Oxford, founded a primary school in Steeple Aston in 1640 along with a pair of almshouses

Steeple Aston has one school, Dr. Radcliffe's Church of England Primary School, in Fir Lane. Dr. Samuel Radcliffe, principal of Brasenose College, Oxford, founded it in 1640 along with a pair of almshouses. Most secondary school pupils from the village attend The Warriner School, Bloxham near Banbury.

== Parish magazine and website ==
Steeple Aston Life, which was first printed in August 1973, is a monthly magazine delivered freely to all residents and sold at the village shop. There is also a parish website.

== In popular culture ==
Early in John le Carré's novel Tinker, Tailor, Soldier, Spy, George Smiley, after a disagreeable dinner, contemplates selling up and leaving London to live in the country and thinks to himself: "Steeple Aston sounds about right."

== Sources and further reading ==
- Brookes, Rev CC (1929). A History of Steeple Aston and North Aston. Shipston-on-Stour: King's Stone Press.
- Crossley, Alan (ed.); Baggs, AP; Colvin, Christina; Colvin, HM; Cooper, Janet; Day, CJ; Selwyn, Nesta; Tomkinson, A (1983). "Steeple Aston". A History of the County of Oxford. Victoria County History. Vol. 11: Wootton Hundred (northern part). London: Oxford University Press for the Institute of Historical Research. pp. 21–44. ISBN 978-0-19722-758-9.
- Sherwood, Jennifer; Pevsner, Nikolaus (1974). Oxfordshire. The Buildings of England. Harmondsworth: Penguin Books. p. 788. ISBN 0-14-071045-0.
