= Nicholas Eversfield =

Nicholas Eversfield may refer to:

- Nicholas Eversfield (MP for Hastings) (c. 1584–1629), English landowner and politician
- Nicholas Eversfield (MP for Bramber) (c. 1646–1684), English landowner and politician
