= Richard Baker (chronicler) =

English politician

Sir Richard Baker
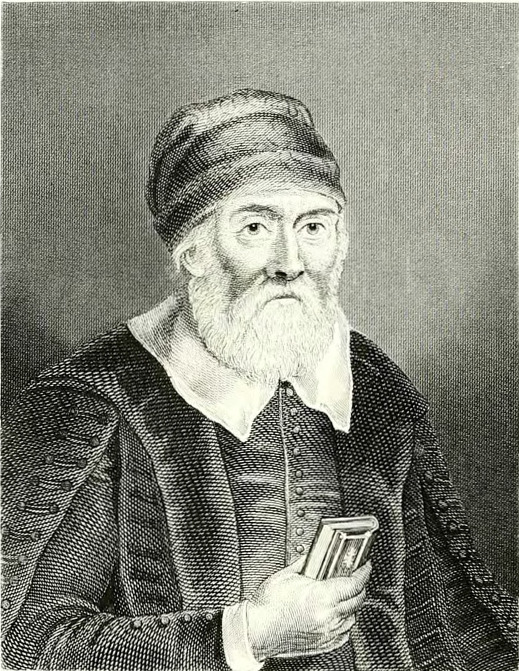
- Born: c. 1568; Sissinghurst, Kent
- Died: 18 February 1645 (aged 76–77); Fleet Prison, London
- Occupations: politician, historian, religious writer
- Notable work: Chronicle of the Kings of England

Sir Richard Baker (c. 1568 – 18 February 1645) was a politician, historian and religious writer. He was the English author of the Chronicle of the Kings of England and other works.

== Family ==
Richard Baker, born about 1568 at Sissinghurst, Kent, was the elder son of John Baker and Katherine Scott, the daughter of Sir Reginald Scott (d. 16 December 1554) of Scot's Hall near Ashford, Kent, and Emeline Kempe, the daughter of Sir William Kempe of Olantigh, by Eleanor, daughter of Sir Robert Browne. Richard Baker's father, John Baker, was the second son of Sir John Baker, the first Chancellor of the Exchequer.

Richard Baker had a younger brother named Thomas, who is doubtless the ancestor of William Baker of Lismacue House in County Tipperary, Ireland.

== Life ==
Richard Baker entered Hart Hall, Oxford, as a commoner in 1584. He left the university without taking a degree, studied law in London and afterwards travelled in Europe. In 1593 he was chosen member of parliament for Arundel, in 1594 his university conferred upon him the degree of M.A., and in 1597 he was elected to parliament as the representative of East Grinstead. In 1603 he was knighted by King James I, in 1620 he acted as high sheriff at Oxfordshire where he owned some property, and soon afterwards he married Margaret, daughter of Sir George Mainwaring, of Ightfield, Shropshire. By making himself responsible for some debts of his wife’s family, he was reduced to great poverty, which led to the seizure of his Oxfordshire property in 1625. Quite penniless, he took refuge in the Fleet prison in 1635, and was still in confinement when he died on 18 February 1644 (1645). He was buried in the church of St Bride, Fleet Street, London.

== Marriage and issue ==
About 1600, Baker married Margaret Mainwaring (d.1654), daughter of Sir George Mainwaring of Ightfield, Shropshire, by whom he had three sons and four daughters:

- Sir Thomas Baker, baptised in 1602, married on 9 April 1629 at St Mary in the parish of Lambeth, Frances Wilford, daughter of Sir Thomas Wilford of Ileden, Kent, and Elizabeth Sandys. They had eight children.
- Mainwaring, baptised in 1603.
- Arthur (died in 1644), barrister at law.
- Anne, baptised in 1607, who married a Mr. Bury.
- Margaret, who produced three manuscript recipe books.
- Cecily/Cecilia (died in 1635), who married on 27 April 1625 at Steeple Aston, Oxfordshire, Francis Wroughton son of George Wroughton. They had six children.
- Frances married on 18 October 1645 at St Anne and St Agnes, London, Robert Smith, citizen and tailor in London. Smith is said to have burned a manuscript of Baker's life.

== Works ==
During his imprisonment Baker spent his time mainly in writing. His chief work is the Chronicle of the Kings of England from the Time of the Romans’ Government unto the Death of King James (1643, and many subsequent editions). It was translated into Dutch in 1649, and was continued down to 1658 by Edward Phillips, a nephew of John Milton. For many years the Chronicle was extremely popular, but owing to numerous inaccuracies its historical value is very slight. Baker also wrote Cato Variegatus or Catoes Morall Distichs, Translated and Paraphrased by Sir Richard Baker, Knight (London, 1636); Meditations on the Lord’s Prayer (1637); Translation of New Epistles by Mounsieur D’Balzac (1638); Apologie for Laymen’s Writing in Divinity, with a Short Meditation upon the Fall of Lucifer (1641); Motives for Prayer upon the seaven dayes of ye weeke (1642); a translation of Virgilio Malvezzi’s Discourses upon Cornelius Tacitus (1642), and Theatrum Redivivum, or The Theatre Vindicated, a reply to the Histrio-Mastix of William Prynne (1642). He also wrote Meditations upon several of the psalms of David, which have been collected and edited by A. B. Grosart (London, 1882).
