= Farnfold =

Farnfold is a surname. Notable people with the surname include:

- Thomas Farnfold (1600–1643), English politician
- John Farnfold, MP for Bramber
