= Thomas Elrington (MP) =

16th-century English politician

Thomas Elrington or Elderton (1520?–1566) was an English politician.

He was a member (MP) of the parliament of England for New Shoreham in October 1553 and Bramber in November 1554.
