= Henry Sydney, 1st Earl of Romney =

English Army officer and politician (1641–1704)

Lieutenant-General The Right Honourable The Earl of Romney PC
- Portrait by John Baptist Medina

Lord Lieutenant of Ireland
- In office 18 March 1692 – 13 June 1693
- Monarchs: William III and Mary II
- Preceded by: Lords Justices
- Succeeded by: Lords Justices

Secretary of State for the Northern Department
- In office 26 December 1690 – 3 March 1692
- Monarchs: William III and Mary II
- Preceded by: The Earl of Nottingham
- Succeeded by: The Earl of Nottingham

Member of Parliament
- In office January 1689 – April 1689 Serving with Henry Gough
- Preceded by: Richard Howe
- Succeeded by: Henry Boyle
- Constituency: Tamworth
- In office August 1679 – January 1681 Serving with Henry Goring
- Preceded by: Nicholas Eversfield
- Succeeded by: Percy Goring
- Constituency: Bramber

English ambassador to the Dutch Republic
- In office June 1679 – 1681
- Monarch: Charles II
- Preceded by: Roger Meredith (Chargé d’Affaires)
- Succeeded by: Thomas Plott (Agent)

Personal details
- Born: 1641 Paris, France
- Died: 8 April 1704 (aged 63) St James's, London
- Resting place: St James's Church, Piccadilly
- Party: Whig
- Occupation: Soldier and politician

Military service
- Allegiance: England
- Branch/service: English Army
- Years of service: 1678–1704
- Rank: Lieutenant-general
- Unit: Holland Regiment
- Commands: 1st Foot Guards
- Battles/wars: Williamite War in Ireland; Battle of the Boyne; Capture of Waterford; Siege of Limerick (1690)

Lieutenant-General Henry Sydney, 1st Earl of Romney (March 1641 – 8 April 1704) was an English Army officer and Whig politician who served as Master-General of the Ordnance from 1693 to 1702. He is best known as one of the Immortal Seven, a group of seven Englishmen who drafted an invitation to William of Orange, which led to the November 1688 Glorious Revolution and subsequent deposition of James II of England.

== Early life ==
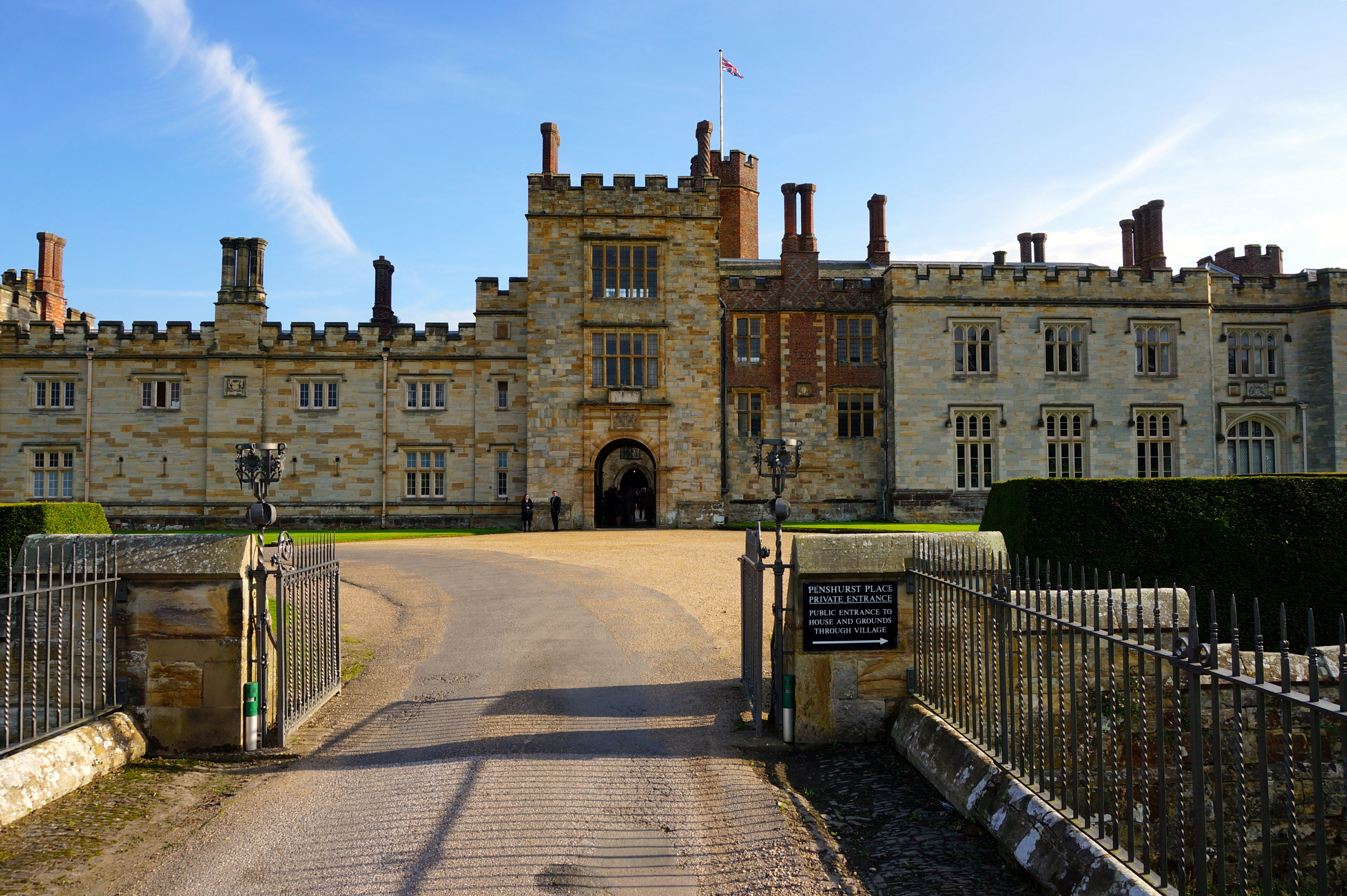
Penshurst Place, the Sydney family home in Kent

Henry Sydney was born in Paris around March 1641, fourth surviving son of Robert Sydney, 2nd Earl of Leicester (1595–1677), and his wife Lady Dorothy Percy (died 1659). His brothers included Philip (1619–1698), who fought for Parliament during the Wars of the Three Kingdoms, and Algernon (1623–1683), a political theorist closely associated with John Locke who was executed in 1683 for his part in the Rye House Plot. Another brother, Robert (1626–1668), served in the army of the Dutch Republic, and was a close companion of the exiled Charles II of England, although he fell from favour shortly before his death.

His eldest sister Dorothy (1617–1684) married Henry Spencer, 1st Earl of Sunderland (1620–1643), who was killed fighting for the Royalists during the First English Civil War; her son, Robert Spencer, 2nd Earl of Sunderland (1641–1702), was born in Paris a few months after Henry and the two men were close friends for most of their lives. From December 1685 to October 1688, Sunderland was Lord President of the Council under James II of England. Another sister, Lucy (circa 1626-1685), married Sir John Pelham, 3rd Baronet (1623–1703), MP for Sussex for most of the period from 1654 to 1695. A Whig who supported the Glorious Revolution, two of his grandsons served as Prime Minister.

Sydney was brought up at Penshurst Place, the family home in Kent and spent much of the period from 1658 to 1664 travelling in Europe with his nephew and contemporary, the future 2nd Earl of Sunderland.

== Career ==
On his return from the continent in 1664, Sydney began to hold positions at court. In 1667, he was commissioned as a captain in the Holland Regiment, then commanded by his brother Robert. In the 1670s, he carried out some minor diplomatic missions and received his first significant office in 1678, when Charles appointed him as Master of the Robes.

In early 1678, England re-entered the Franco-Dutch War as an ally of the Dutch Republic, and Sydney was given command of a new regiment raised to fight in the war. Although it ended before he saw active service, he became a friend of William of Orange; and with the support of Sunderland, then Secretary of State for the Northern Department, in June 1679 he was appointed Envoy to the United Provinces, a position he held with marked success until 1681.

In October 1679, he was also elected as MP for Bramber in what is commonly called the "Exclusion Bill Parliament". The central issue during this period was the attempt to exclude the Catholic Duke of York from the succession. Sydney was a "Williamite exclusionist", one of those who supported exclusion but preferred William of Orange, son of a Stuart mother and married to James' eldest daughter Mary, rather than Charles' illegitimate son, James Scott, 1st Duke of Monmouth. This ultimately led to his dismissal, although he was permitted to return to the Netherlands in 1682 and given command of one of the English regiments of the Dutch Anglo-Scots Brigade.

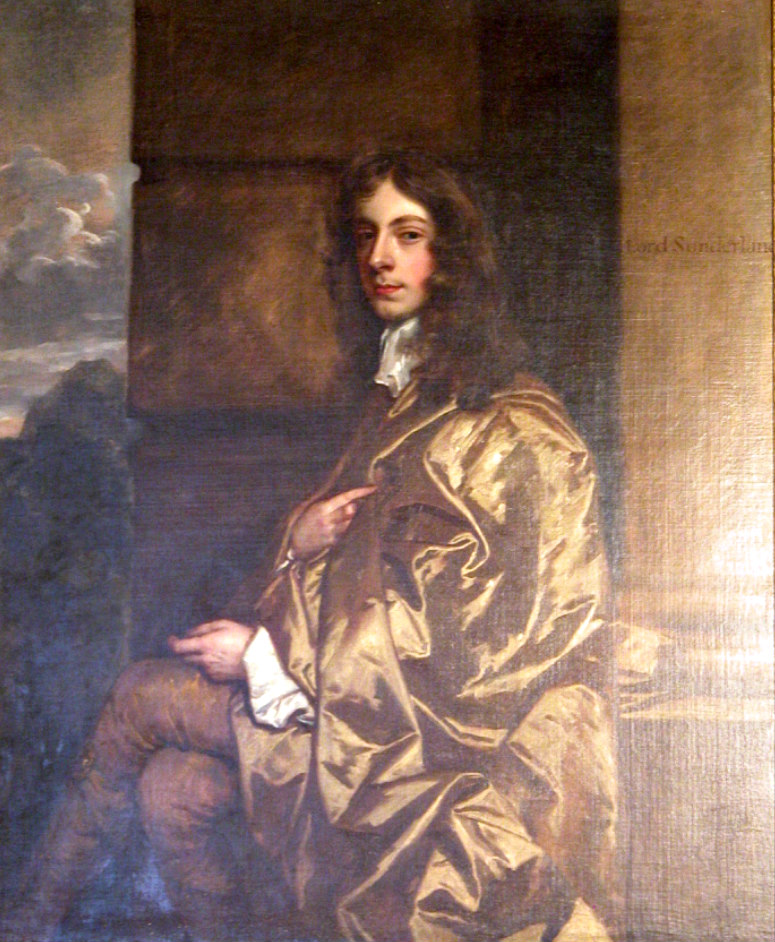
Sydney's nephew, contemporary and close friend, Robert Spencer, 2nd Earl of Sunderland, Lord President of the Council under James II of England

In 1683, Algernon Sydney was executed for his part in the Rye House Plot, an alleged conspiracy to assassinate Charles II along with his brother James, and place Monmouth on the throne. Charles died in February 1685, and James succeeded to the English throne, leading to the June 1685 Monmouth Rebellion. As William's wife Mary was then the heir to the throne, after James, William sent troops to help suppress Monmouth. Sydney was thus able to balance his obligations as a loyal subject with acting as an informal contact point between William and his English supporters, as well as Sunderland, whom James appointed Lord President of the Council in 1685. The situation changed in June 1688 with the birth of a male heir, James Francis Edward Stuart; the prospect of a Catholic dynasty led to the Invitation to William. Signed by the Immortal Seven, representatives from the key political constituencies whose support William needed to commit to an invasion, it was drafted by Sydney, later described as "the great wheel on which the Revolution rolled".

In August, he journeyed to The Hague and was appointed major general in the invasion force assembled by William that landed at Torbay on 5 November. In what became known as the Glorious Revolution, most of James' army changed sides and he escaped into exile in France on 23 December. Sydney was elected one of the MPs for Tamworth in the 1689 Convention Parliament which on 14 February made William and Mary co-monarchs in place of her father. On 4 April, he was created Baron Milton and Viscount Sydney, became a Privy Councillor and received a number of other offices, including Lord Lieutenant of Kent and Constable of Dover Castle.

Sydney accompanied William in 1690 when he took personal charge of the war in Ireland; appointed colonel of the Foot Guards, he fought at the Boyne in July, as well as the sieges of Waterford and Limerick. Recalled to London in December 1690, he was appointed Secretary of State for the Northern Department, before returning to Ireland as Lord Lieutenant in March 1692. Although his tenure was marked by conflict with the Irish Parliament and lasted less than a year, he retained William's confidence; in 1693, he was made Master-General of the Ordnance, then promoted to lieutenant general and created Earl of Romney in 1694.

It has been suggested that the use of the pheon, or broad arrow, on government property dates from Sydney's time as Master-General of the Ordnance. However, the Oxford English Dictionary finds that "this is not supported by the evidence", as the use of the device dates from before Sydney's term of office.

In 1694, Sydney purchased the office of Chief Ranger of Greenwich Park, allowing him to use the Queen's House as a personal residence. He undertook a series of improvements, one of which was to alter the course of the main road between Woolwich and Deptford, part of which is now called "Romney Road". He remained a close advisor to William and accompanied him to The Hague for the negotiations that led to the signing of the Second Grand Alliance in September 1701. However, when William died and Queen Anne came to the throne in March 1702, he lost most of his offices and retired from active political life; he died of smallpox at his house in London on 8 April 1704, and was buried a few days later at St James's Church, Piccadilly.

== Reputation ==
Sydney's reputation has been subject to a variety of views; some contemporaries considered him lazy and superficial, while Tory satirist Jonathan Swift dismissed him as 'an idle, drunken, ignorant rake, without sense or honour'. Other perspectives are more charitable and in general present him as "an individual with flaws, but also remarkable for his even temper, straight dealing, good judgement, and a knack for gaining the trust of others".

== Personal life and death ==
Sydney never married but he had an illegitimate son, Henry Worthley. On 8 April 1704, he died of smallpox at his house in London and was buried a few days later in St James's Church, Piccadilly. His titles became extinct.

== Sources ==
- Crook, B.M (1983). PELHAM, Sir John, 3rd Bt. (c.1623-1703), of Halland, Laughton, Suss in The History of Parliament: the House of Commons 1660–1690. CUP. ISBN 978-1107002258.
- Harris, Tim (1993). Politics under the later Stuarts. Longman. ISBN 0-58204082-5.
- Harris, Tim (2006). Revolution: The Great Crisis of the British Monarchy, 1685–1720. Allen Lane. ISBN 978-0-7139-9759-0.
- Hosford, Stuart (2004). "Sidney, Henry, first earl of Romney (1641–1704)". Oxford Dictionary of National Biography (online ed.). Oxford University Press. doi:10.1093/ref:odnb/25521. (Subscription, Wikipedia Library access or UK public library membership required.)
- Jackson, Clare (2021). Devil-Land; England under siege 1588-1688. Allen Lane. ISBN 978-0-241-285817.
- Jones, J. R. (1988). The Revolution of 1688 in England. Weidenfeld and Nicolson. ISBN 978-0-297-99569-2.
- Mimardière, A.M (1983). SIDNEY (SYDNEY), Hon. Henry (1641–1704), of Jermyn Street, Westminster and Elverton, Stone, Kent in The History of Parliament: the House of Commons 1660–1690. CUP. ISBN 978-1107002258.
- Scott, Jonathan (2004). "Sidney [Sydney], Algernon". Oxford Dictionary of National Biography (online ed.). Oxford University Press. doi:10.1093/ref:odnb/25519. (Subscription, Wikipedia Library access or UK public library membership required.)
- Speck, W. A. (2008). "Spencer, Robert, second earl of Sunderland (1641–1702)". Oxford Dictionary of National Biography (online ed.). Oxford University Press. doi:10.1093/ref:odnb/26135. (Subscription, Wikipedia Library access or UK public library membership required.)
- Spence, Keith (2000). The companion guide to Kent and Sussex. Companion Guides. ISBN 978-1900639262.
- * Swift, Jonathan (1962). Davis, H (ed.). The Prose Works of Jonathan Swift; Volume V. Blackwell.
- Weinreb, Ben; Hibbert, Christopher (1992). The London Encyclopaedia (2008 ed.). Macmillan. ISBN 978-1405049245.

Political offices
Preceded by The Earl of Nottingham	Secretary of State for the Northern Department; 1690–1692	Succeeded by The Earl of Nottingham
Preceded by Lords Justices	Lord Lieutenant of Ireland; 1692–1693	Succeeded by Lords Justices
Parliament of England
Preceded by Nicholas Eversfield; Henry Goring	Member of Parliament for Bramber; 1679–1681; Served alongside: Henry Goring	Succeeded by Percy Goring; Henry Goring
Preceded by Richard Howe; Henry Gough	Member of Parliament for Tamworth; 1689; Served alongside: Henry Gough	Succeeded by Henry Boyle; Henry Gough
Military offices
Preceded by The Duke of Grafton	Colonel of the 1st Regiment of Foot Guards; 1689–1690	Succeeded by The 2nd Duke of Schomberg
Vacant Title last held by The 1st Duke of Schomberg	Master-General of the Ordnance; 1693–1702	Succeeded by The Duke of Marlborough
Preceded by The 2nd Duke of Schomberg	Colonel of the 1st Regiment of Foot Guards; 1693–1704	Succeeded by The Duke of Marlborough
Court offices
Preceded by Sidney Godolphin	Master of the Robes; 1679–1685	Succeeded by Arthur Herbert
Preceded by The Earl of Portland	Groom of the Stole; 1699–1704	Succeeded by The Duchess of Marlborough
Honorary titles
Preceded by Sir John Beaumont	Lord Warden of the Cinque Ports; 1691–1702	Succeeded by Prince George of Denmark
Preceded by The Lord Teynham	Vice-Admiral of Kent; 1689–1702	Succeeded by The 4th Earl of Winchilsea
Preceded by The 3rd Earl of Winchilsea	Lord Lieutenant of Kent jointly with The Earl of Westmorland 1692–1693; 1689–1704	Succeeded by The 4th Earl of Winchilsea
Preceded by The 3rd Earl of Winchilsea	Custos Rotulorum of Kent; 1689–1704	Succeeded by The 4th Earl of Winchilsea
Peerage of England
New title	Earl of Romney; 1694–1704	Extinct
New title	Viscount Sydney; 1689–1704	Extinct
