= Steeple Aston Cope =

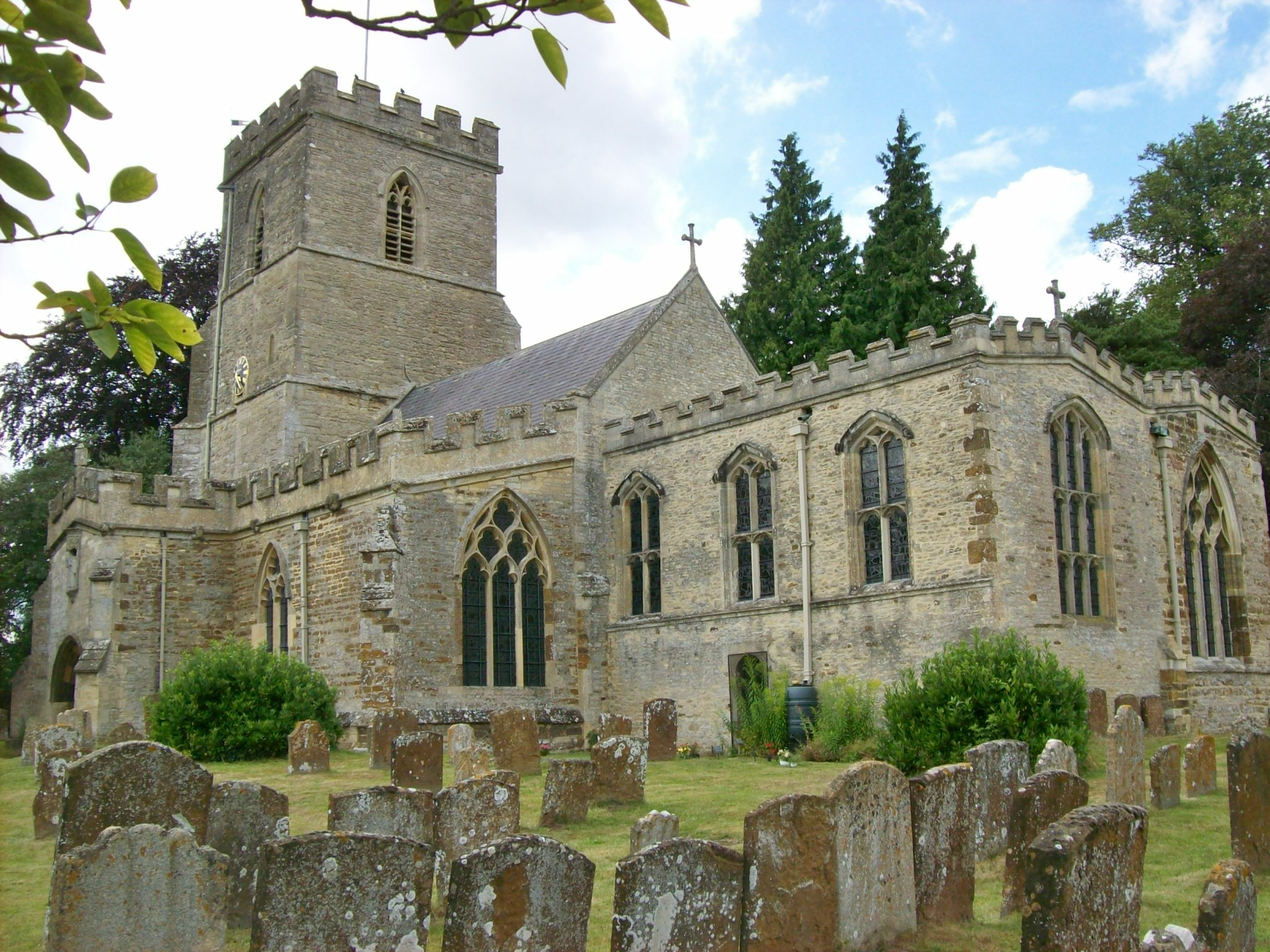
The church in Steeple Aston

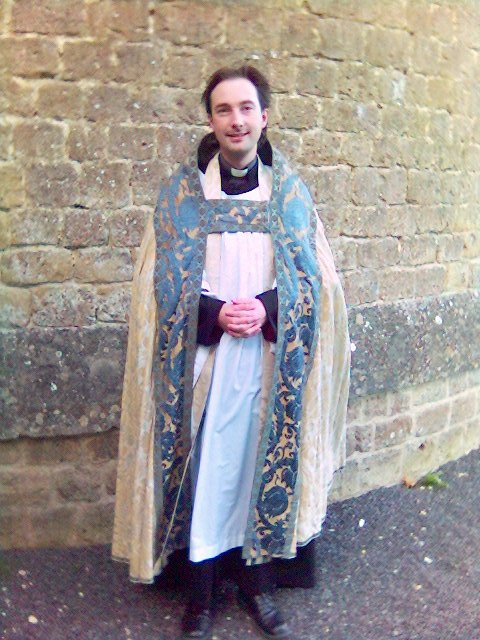
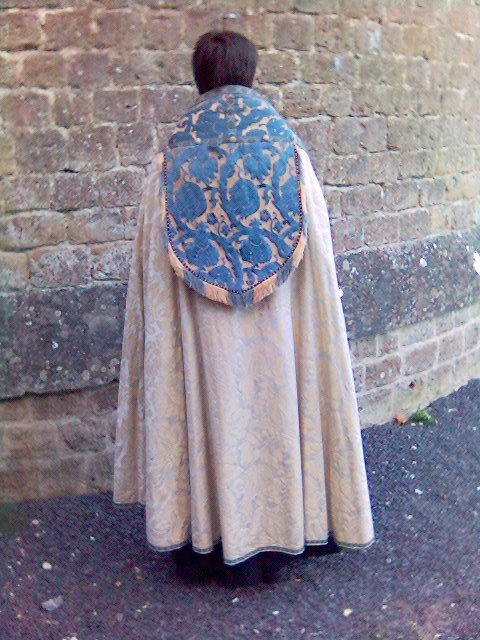
Pictures of a priest wearing a modern cope, illustrating how it was worn

The Steeple Aston Cope is a cope made between 1320 and 1340. It is notable for being one of the few surviving examples of English medieval embroidery (also known by the Latin name Opus Anglicanum), and is the earliest known depiction of a lute in England. It was made with silk, silver and gold threads.

It was cut up during the English Reformation and used as an altar cloth, among other uses. It was rediscovered in a medieval chest in the Church of St Peter and St Paul in the village of Steeple Aston in Oxfordshire in the 19th century. The cope belongs to the Church but has been on loan to the Victoria and Albert Museum in London since 1905. In 2003 it was briefly returned to the Steeple Aston church, and put on display to raise funds for roof repairs.
