= Sir Francis Leicester, 3rd Baronet =

Sir Francis Leicester, 3rd Baronet (1674–1742) of Tabley, Cheshire was a British landowner and politician who sat in the House of Commons from 1715 to 1727.

Leicester was born on 30 July 1674, the eldest surviving son of Sir Robert Leicester, 2nd Baronet, of Tabley and his wife Meriell Watson, daughter of Francis Watson of Church Aston, near Newport, Shropshire. His father died on 7 July 1684 and he succeeded to the baronetcy. He was educated at Eton College from 1686 to 1692 and was admitted at St. John’s College, Cambridge on 6 April 1692. He was also admitted at Middle Temple on 28 November 1694. Sometime between. 1701 and 1705, he married Frances Thornhill, widow of Byrom Thornhill of Fixby, Yorkshire and daughter of Joshua Wilson of Pontefract and Colton, Yorkshire.

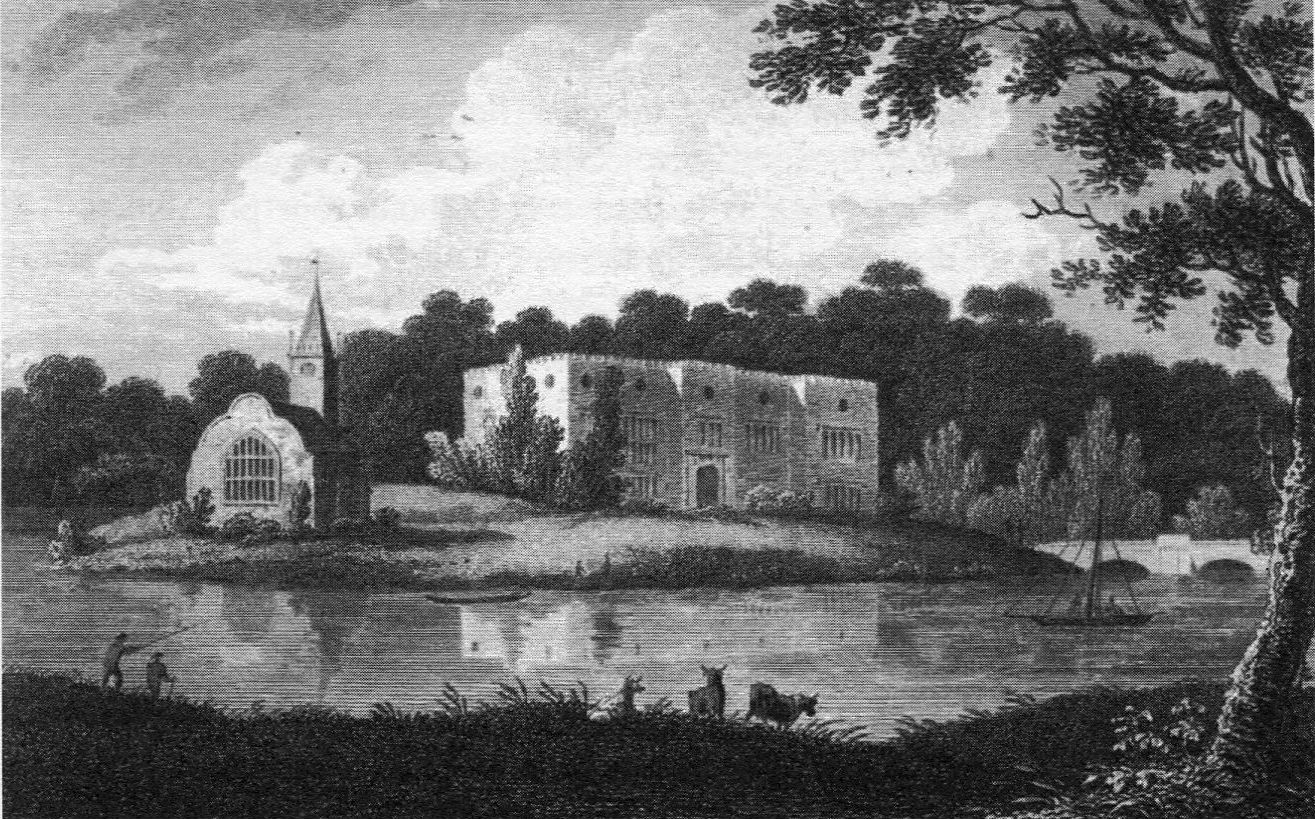
Engraving of Tabley Old Hall

Leicester was High Sheriff of Cheshire for the year 1705 to 1706. At the 1715 general election, he was returned as Member of Parliament for Newton by his friend, Peter Legh XII of Lyme, who owned the borough. He was returned again at the 1722 general election. Leicester did not stand in 1727 or after.

Leicester extended Tabley Old Hall, increasing the servants' quarters, and adding another wing including a new library. Sir Francis was a noted collector of books, buying books in London from such booksellers as Fletcher Giles and Thomas Osborne. He discussed his purchases and the contents of books themselves with his friend Peter Legh XII of Lyme. They borrowed each other's books on occasions. Several versions of Leicester's book catalogue still exist showing what he valued in his collection and how he had arranged his collection of the Tabley shelves. An inventory taken after his death listed the furniture in his library and by implication how it was used.

Leicester died on 5 August 1742 and the baronetcy became extinct. He and his wife had one daughter Merriel, who married firstly Fleetwood Legh, with whom she had a daughter and secondly Sir John Byrne of Timogue. in 1728. Leicester left her his estate worth £10,000 per annum, but his will, required his heirs to change their name to Leicester and to maintain the hall in good order; otherwise they would forfeit the inheritance. The inheritance fell to Merriel’s eldest son by her second marriage who duly changed his name from Byrne to Leicester. As he could not demolish the old hall, he built a completely new house about 700 metres away, which is the present Tabley House and the family moved into it in 1767.

Parliament of Great Britain
Preceded by John Ward; Abraham Blackmore	Member of Parliament for Newton; 1715–1727; With: William Shippen	Succeeded by Legh Master; William Shippen
Baronetage of England
Preceded by Robert Leicester	Baronet (of Tabley); 1684-1742	Extinct
