= Richard Gough (1655–1728) =

British merchant and politician (1655–1728)

Sir Richard Gough (10 October 1655 – 1728), of Edgbaston Hall, Warwickshire. and Gough House, Chelsea, was a British merchant and politician who sat in the House of Commons from 1715 to 1728.

Gough was the third son of John Gough of Oldfallings, in Bushbury, Staffordshire and his second wife Bridget Astley, daughter of John Astley of Wood Eaton, Staffordshire. He was brought up in business under Sir James Houblon, MP and received the mercantile advice and assistance of Sir Josiah Child. He made a great fortune trading in the East Indies and was considered to have an expert knowledge of British trade and commerce, and was second to none regarding the East India trade. He married Ann Crisp, daughter of Nicholas Crisp of Chiswick after a settlement made on 5 September 1701.

In 1713 Gough became a Director of the East India Company. In 1714 he purchased 18 burgage houses at Bramber which gave him control of one of the seats there. He was knighted on 8 January 1715. At the 1715 general election he was returned as Member of Parliament for Bramber. He voted for the septennial bill and went into opposition with Robert Walpole in 1717. and voted against the Peerage Bill. He was returned again for Bramber at the general elections of 1722 and 1727.

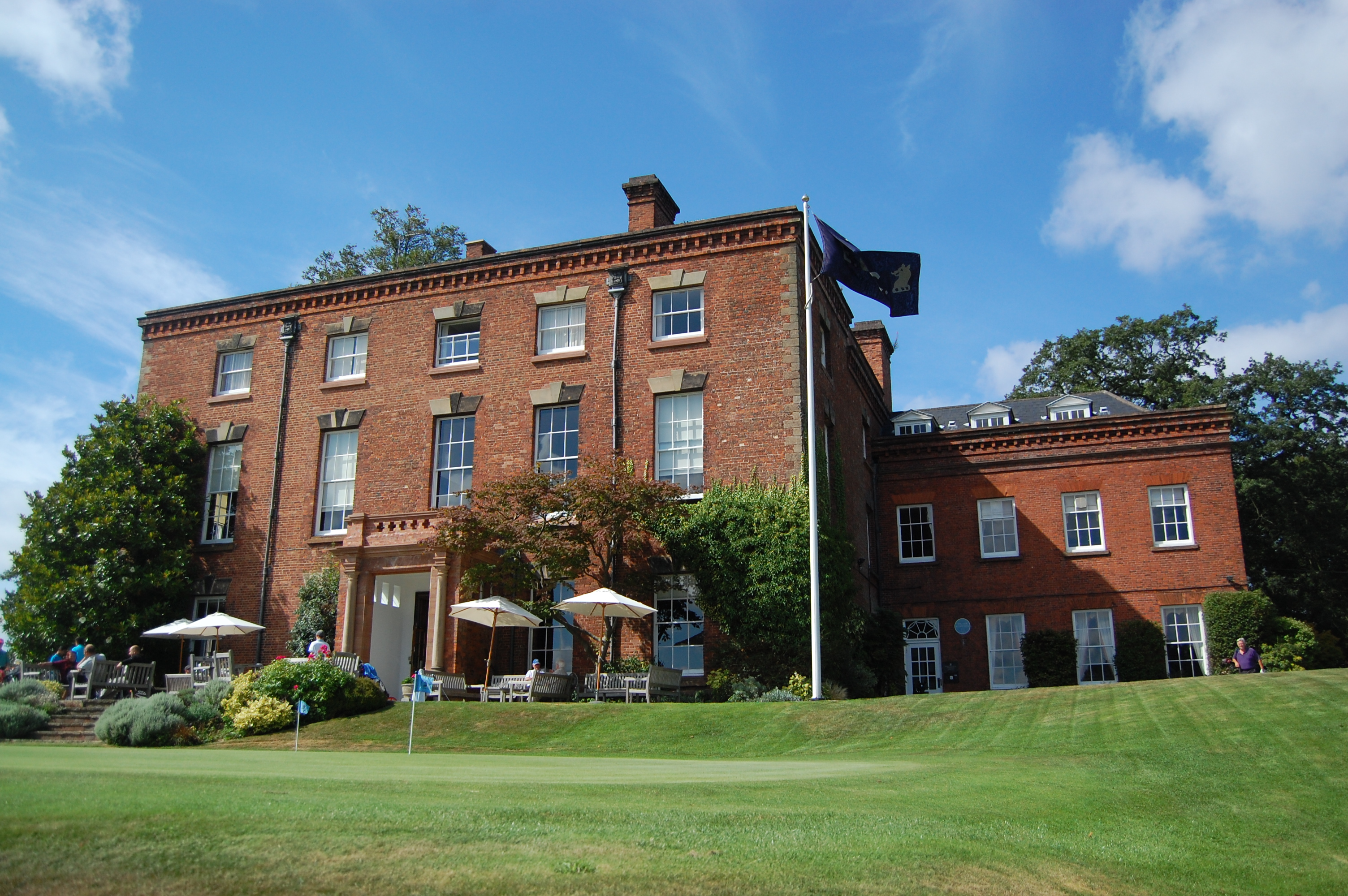
Edgbaston Hall

In 1717, Gough bought an estate at Edgbaston, and over ten years he rebuilt Edgbaston Hall and the church and enclosed Edgbaston Park. He died on 9 February 1728 and expected to be buried in the church at Edgbaston. He and his wife had three sons and four daughters. His eldest surviving son Henry was also an MP and became a baronet.

Parliament of Great Britain
Preceded by The Lord Hawley; Andrews Windsor	Member of Parliament for Bramber; 1715–1728; With: Sir Thomas Style 1715; Edward Minshull 1715–1722; William Charles van Huls 1722–1723; David Polhill 1723–1727; Joseph Danvers 1727–1728	Succeeded by John Gumley; Joseph Danvers
