= Richard Baker (English politician, died 1594) =

Member of the Parliament of England

Sir Richard Baker (by 1530 – 27 May 1594), was an English politician.

== Family ==
Richard Baker was the eldest son of Sir John Baker, Chancellor of the Exchequer and his second wife Elizabeth Dineley. He had a younger brother, John, and three sisters, one of whom, Cecily, was the wife of Thomas Sackville, Lord Buckhurst.

== Career ==
Baker studied law at the Inner Temple. He succeeded his father in 1558, and was knighted on 31 August 1573.

He was elected a member (MP) of the Parliament of England for Horsham in April 1554, Lancaster in November 1554, New Romney in 1555 and New Shoreham in 1558. He was a justice of the peace for Kent from 1558 and appointed High Sheriff of Kent for 1562–63 and 1582–83.

== Marriages and issue ==
Baker married firstly Katherine Tyrrell, the stepdaughter of Sir William Petre. She was the daughter and heiress of John Tyrrell (d.1540), esquire, of Heron in East Horndon, Essex, (eldest son of Sir Thomas Tyrrell and Constance Blount), and his wife, Anne Browne, the daughter of Sir William Browne, Lord Mayor of London, by his second wife, Alice Keble (d. 8 June 1521), the daughter of Henry Keble (1452 - April 1517), Lord Mayor of London, by whom he had two sons and a daughter.

Baker married secondly Mary, the daughter of John Gifford of Weston Subedge, Gloucestershire, with whom he had another 2 daughters. He was succeeded by his son Thomas.

One of his daughters by Mary was Chrysogna Baker (d. 1616) who married Sir Henry Lennard, 12th Baron Dacre and had issue.
