= Henry Goring (1646–1685) =

English soldier and politician

Henry Goring (6 April 1646 – 10 June 1685) was an English soldier and politician who sat in the House of Commons between 1673 and 1685.

Goring was the son of Sir Henry Goring, 2nd Baronet of the first creation and his wife Diana Bishopp daughter of Sir Edward Bishopp. He was a captain in the Regiment of Foot. In 1671 he purchased an estate at Wappingthorn, Steyning, Sussex.

Goring was elected Member of Parliament (MP) for New Shoreham in 1673 and held the seat to 1678. In 1679 he was elected MP for Bramber and held the seat until 1685. In 1685 he was elected MP for Steyning. He was High Sheriff of Sussex from 1681 to 1682.

Goring was killed at a theatre by Sir Edward Dering, 3rd Baronet, or Dering's son Charles, at the age of 39.

Goring had married, firstly, Elizabeth Morewood, daughter of Anthony Morewood, in October 1667 and secondly, Mary Covert, daughter of Sir John Covert, 1st Baronet, in 1676. He left three sons, one, Sir Charles Goring, 3rd Baronet by his first wife and two, including Sir Henry Goring, 4th Baronet, by his second.

Parliament of England
Preceded by Sir John Fagg, Bt; Edward Blaker	Member of Parliament for New Shoreham; 1673–1678; With: Edward Blaker; Anthony Dean	Succeeded by Sir Robert Fagg, Bt; John Cheale
Preceded by Sir Cecil Bishopp, Bt; Percy Goring	Member of Parliament for Bramber; 1679–1685; With: Nicholas Eversfield; Henry Sydney; Percy Goring	Succeeded by Thomas Bludworth; William Bridgeman
Preceded by James Morton; Sir John Fagg, Bt	Member of Parliament for Steyning; March 1685 – June 1685; With: Sir John Fagg, Bt	Succeeded by James Morton; Sir John Fagg, Bt
