= William Kingsmill (died 1618) =

William Kingsmill (died 1618) was an English landowner.

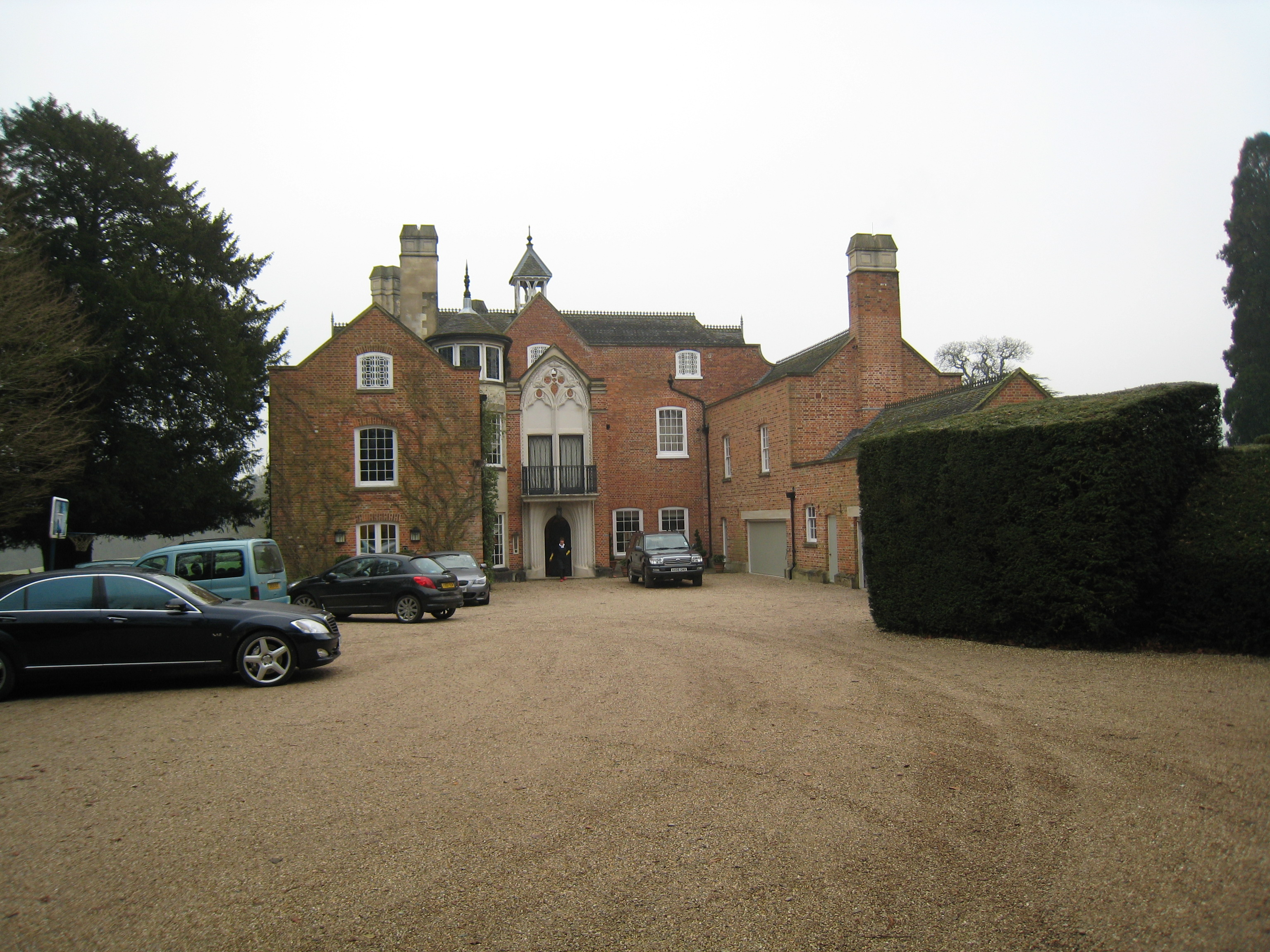
Sydmonton Court

He was a son of William Kingsmill (died 1592) and Bridget Raleigh (died 1607), a daughter of George Raleigh.

His home was at Sydmonton. He was Sheriff of Hampshire in 1601 and 1612.

King James and Anne of Denmark stayed at Sydmonton Court in August 1603. Anne of Denmark stayed in August 1611.

He died in January 1618.

== Marriage and family ==
He married Anne Wilkes or Willes, daughter of William Willes of Middleton Cheney. Their children included:

- Henry Kingsmill of Sidmonton (1587-1624), who married Bridget White (died 1672), their son Henry was killed at the battle of Edgehill.
- Richard Kingsmill of Malshanger (died 1663)
- Constance Kingsmill, who married Thomas Baker (died 1625) of Whittingham Hall, Fressingfield
- Elizabeth Kingsmill, who married Edward Tyrrell of Thornton
- Eleanor Kingsmill, who married Timothy Tyrrell (died 1632), a Master of the Royal Hounds.
- Frances Kingsmill, who married Guido Forster of Hanslope

Anne, Lady Kingsmill wrote to the Earl of Salisbury on 14 June 1608, thanking him for favours shown to herself and her son.
