= William Shippen (MP) =

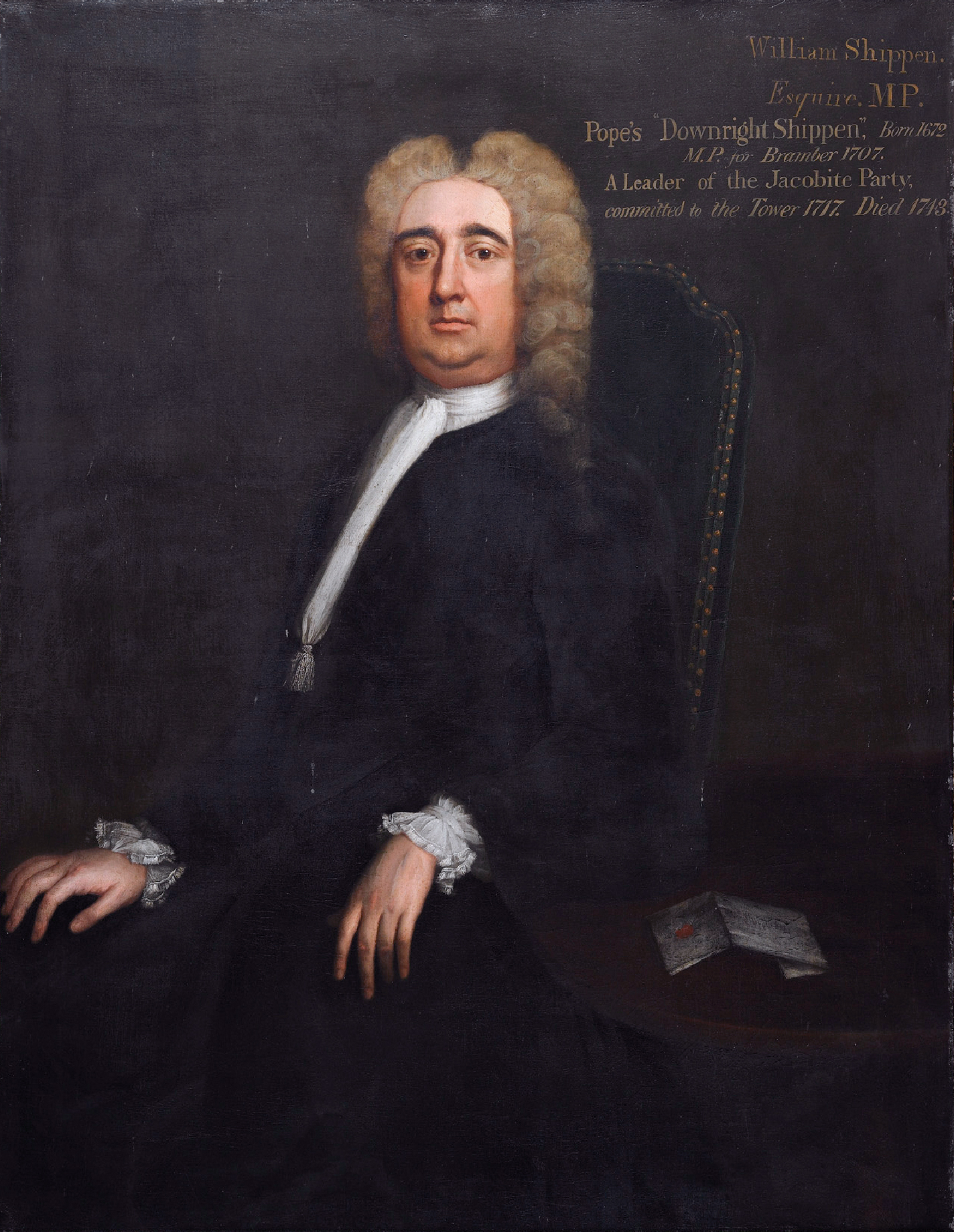
William Shippen (Enoch Seeman)

William Shippen (bap. 30 July 1673 – 1 May 1743) was an English Jacobite and Tory politician who sat in the House of Commons from 1707 to 1743.

Shippen was educated at Stockport Grammar School, and entered Brasenose College, Oxford on 16 July 1687. Shortly one year after his matriculation he was elected king's scholar at Westminster. Admitted a pensioner of Trinity College, Cambridge on 26 June 1691 he became a scholar there the next year. Shippen went to the Middle Temple in 1693 and graduated with a BA the year after and was called to the bar in 1699., On 17 July 1712 he married Frances Stote (d. 1747), daughter of Sir Richard Stote of Jesmond Hall, Northumberland.

Shippen made several contributions to the fierce propaganda war between Tories and Whigs in the early 18th century. In reign of Queen Anne he wrote and published two satirical poems, Faction Display'd (1704) and Moderation Display'd (1705). Both were successful, running into several editions and provoking Whig counterattacks. Years later, in 1732, Shippen produced a prose defence of Charles I.

Shippen was Member of Parliament for Bramber, Sussex from 1707 to 1713 under the patronage of Lord Plymouth. He was elected member for Saltash, Cornwall at the 1713 general election. At the 1715 general election he was elected MP for Newton, Lancashire which he represented for the rest of his life.

In the Commons Shippen often 'distinguished himself, speaking forcefully in debates...His purpose throughout was to advance the Stuart cause by any means that seemed likely to prove effective'. In 1717 Shippen criticised George I's speech as "rather...calculated for the Meridian of Germany, then for Great Britain" and called King George "a Stranger to our Language and Constitution". The House resolved that Shippen had said words "highly dishonourable to, and unjustly reflecting on, his Majesty's Person & Government" and he was sent to the Tower of London on 4 December 1717. In March the next year he wrote to the Old Pretender, James Francis Edward Stuart, informing him that all his wishes would be obeyed "with the utmost pleasure as well as fidelity". In mid-1721 Shippen, as the main go-between of English and Scottish Jacobites, met George Lockhart in Newcastle in order to come to an agreement on the best way to correspond. In 1740, however, Shippen was dropped from the Pretender's correspondence with English Jacobites for a French-backed rising due to the way he "trembles, and infuses his fears into the gentlemen to whom the King [the Pretender] wrote". In February 1741 Shippen absented himself from the Commons rather than vote for Samuel Sandys's motion for Sir Robert Walpole's removal from office, declaring: "Robin and I are two honest men, he is for King George and I for King James; but those men with the long cravats only desire places either under King George or King James". He further commented that he would not "pull down Robin on republican principles".

He died childless in 1743.

== Notes ==
Parliament of Great Britain
Preceded by John Asgill; The Viscount Windsor	Member of Parliament for Bramber; 1707 – 1709; With: The Viscount Windsor	Succeeded by William Hale; Sir Cleave More, Bt
Preceded by The Viscount Windsor; Andrews Windsor	Member of Parliament for Bramber; 1710 – 1713; With: Andrews Windsor	Succeeded by Andrews Windsor; The Lord Hawley
Preceded by Jonathan Elford; Sir William Carew, Bt	Member of Parliament for Saltash; 1713 – 1715; With: Jonathan Elford	Succeeded by Shilston Calmady; John Francis Buller
Preceded by Abraham Blackmore; John Ward	Member of Parliament for Newton; 1715 – 1743; With: Sir Francis Leicester, Bt 1715–27; Legh Master from 1727	Succeeded by Legh Master; Peter Legh
