= Sir Cecil Bishopp, 4th Baronet =

English landowner and politician

Sir Cecil Bishopp, 4th Baronet (c. 1635 – 3 June 1705) was an English landowner and politician who sat in the House of Commons from 1662. He was the brother of Sir Thomas Bishopp, 3rd Baronet (1627–1652).

Bishopp was the son of Sir Edward Bishopp, 2nd Baronet of Parham and his wife Mary Tufton, daughter of Nicholas Tufton, 1st Earl of Thanet and Lady Frances Cecil. Lady Frances Cecil was the daughter of Thomas Cecil, 1st Earl of Exeter and Dorothy Neville. Thomas Cecil, 1st Earl of Exeter was the son of William Cecil, Lord Burghley. Subsequent Bishopp baronets carried the name Cecil in recognition of this influential ancestor. He succeeded to the baronetcy on the death of his brother in 1652. In 1662, he was elected Member of Parliament for Bramber in a by-election to the Cavalier Parliament.

Bishopp died at the age of about 70 and was buried at Parham on 6 June 1705.

Bishopp married Sarah Bury, daughter and heiress of George Bury of Culham Manor, Oxfordshire at Culham Manor on 17 June 1666 and Anne Sprignell the daughter of Robert Sprignell of Highgate, Middlesex; His father Richard Sprignell was a respected citizen and barber surgeon of London, is mentioned more than once in Young's Annals of the Barber Surgeons' Company. He was a warden in 1584, 1587 and 1591 and was excused from serving as Master on 5 July 1599. She was also the sister of Sir Richard Sprignell, 1st Baronet connected by marriage with the regicide Sir Michael Livesey (a signatory of the King Charles I's death warrant). Sarah Bishopp (née Bury) inherited Culham Manor. The Burys retained possession of the manor until 1666 when by the marriage of George's daughter and heiress Sarah to Sir Cecil Bishopp, Culham Manor passed into the Bishopp family. The Bisshopps lived part of the time at Culham at least until Sarah Bury's early death in 1680 (the initials CB for Cecil Bishopp are carved into the Manor's very large dovecote).

He was succeeded in the baronetcy by his son Cecil.

He also had a daughter Christian Bishopp who married Sir Robert Fagge, 3rd Baronet.

Parliament of England
Preceded by John Byne; Percy Goring	Member of Parliament for Bramber; 1662–1679; With: Percy Goring	Succeeded by Henry Goring; Nicholas Eversfield
Baronetage of England
Preceded by Thomas Bishopp	Baronet (of Parham); 1652–1705	Succeeded by Cecil Bishopp
