= Sir Thomas Style, 4th Baronet =

English landowner and politician

Sir Thomas Style, 4th Baronet (c. 1685–1769), was an English landowner and politician who sat in the House of Commons for a short time in 1715.

Style was the son of Sir Thomas Style, 2nd Baronet of Wateringbury and his second wife Margaret Twisden, daughter of Sir Thomas Twisden, 1st Baronet. He was educated at Enfield, Middlesex under Mr Uvedale, and was admitted at Trinity College, Cambridge, aged 19 on 13 September 1704. He succeeded his half-brother Oliver in the baronetcy on 12 February 1703. He married Elizabeth Hotham, daughter of Sir Charles Hotham, 4th Baronet. In 1707 he pulled down the ancient mansion of Wateringbury-Place, which had a moat around it and built a new mansion to the west of it.

Style was High Sheriff of Kent in the year 1709 to 1710. At the 1715 general election he was returned as a Tory Member of Parliament for Bramber, but was unseated on petition within six months. He did not stand for parliament again.

Style died on 11 January 1769. He and his wife had four sons and two daughters. He was succeeded in the baronetcy by his son Charles.

Parliament of Great Britain
Preceded by The Lord Hawley; Andrews Windsor	Member of Parliament for Bramber; 1715–1715; With: Sir Richard Gough	Succeeded by Sir Richard Gough; Edward Minshull
Baronetage of England
Preceded by Oliver Style	Baronet (of Wateringbury); 1703-1769	Succeeded by Charles Style
