= Legh Master =

English politician (c. 1694–1750)

Legh Master (c.1694–1750) of New Hall, Ashton in Makerfield, Lancashire. and Codnor Castle, Derbyshire, was a British Tory politician who sat in the House of Commons from 1727 to 1747.

== Early life ==
Master was the eldest son of Sir Streynsham Master, governor of Madras from 1677 to 1681, and director of the East India Company, of Codnor Castle, Derbyshire and his second wife Elizabeth Legh, daughter of Richard Legh, M.P., of Lyme, Cheshire. He was educated at Isleworth school Middlesex, and was admitted at St John's College, Cambridge 23 June 1711. He married Margaret Launder daughter of Thomas Launder of New Hall Ashton in Makerfield on. 26 April 1716. His wife Margaret died on 25 July 1733. He succeeded his father at Codnor Castle and Stanley Grange, Derbyshire in 1724.

== Career ==
Master was Mayor of Wigan in 1726. At the 1727 British general election he was returned as Tory Member of Parliament for Newton by his uncle, Peter Legh of Lyme, the proprietor of the borough. He was returned again at the 1734 British general election. He voted regularly against the Government.

Master married as his second wife (with £15,000), Anne Smith, daughter of Charles Smith of Isleworth, Middlesex on. 10 July 1739. His attendance in Parliament began to be less reliable. He was absent from the division on the place bill in 1740. He was returned again for Newton at the 1741 British general election, but on 16 December 1741, he was again absent from a division on the chairman of committees. Sir Watkin Williams Wynn scathingly wrote at the end of December that a small fit of illness, and slight fit of the gout could not be a plea, when the fate of the country may very possibly turn upon a single vote. However, he continued to be absent from all subsequent recorded divisions. He was not put up for Newton again at the 1747 British general election.

== Death and legacy ==
Master died on 2 April 1750. He and his first wife Margaret had eight children:

- Legh Master (1717-1796)
- . Richard Master (1718-1745)
- . Streynsham Master (1720-1741)
- . Thomas Master (1723-1742)
- . Elizabeth Master (1724-1810)
- . Robert Master (1726-1798)
- James Master (1728-1729)
- . Ann Master (1730-1734)

His son Legh went to Maryland in America, where his life and death gave rise to folklore and legend.

Parliament of Great Britain
Preceded by Sir Francis Leicester; William Shippen	Member of Parliament for Newton; 1727–1747; With: William Shippen 1727-1743; Peter Legh 1743-1747	Succeeded by Sir Thomas Egerton; Peter Legh
