= Claude Duval (opera) =

Comic opera by Edward Solomon and Henry Pottinger Stephens

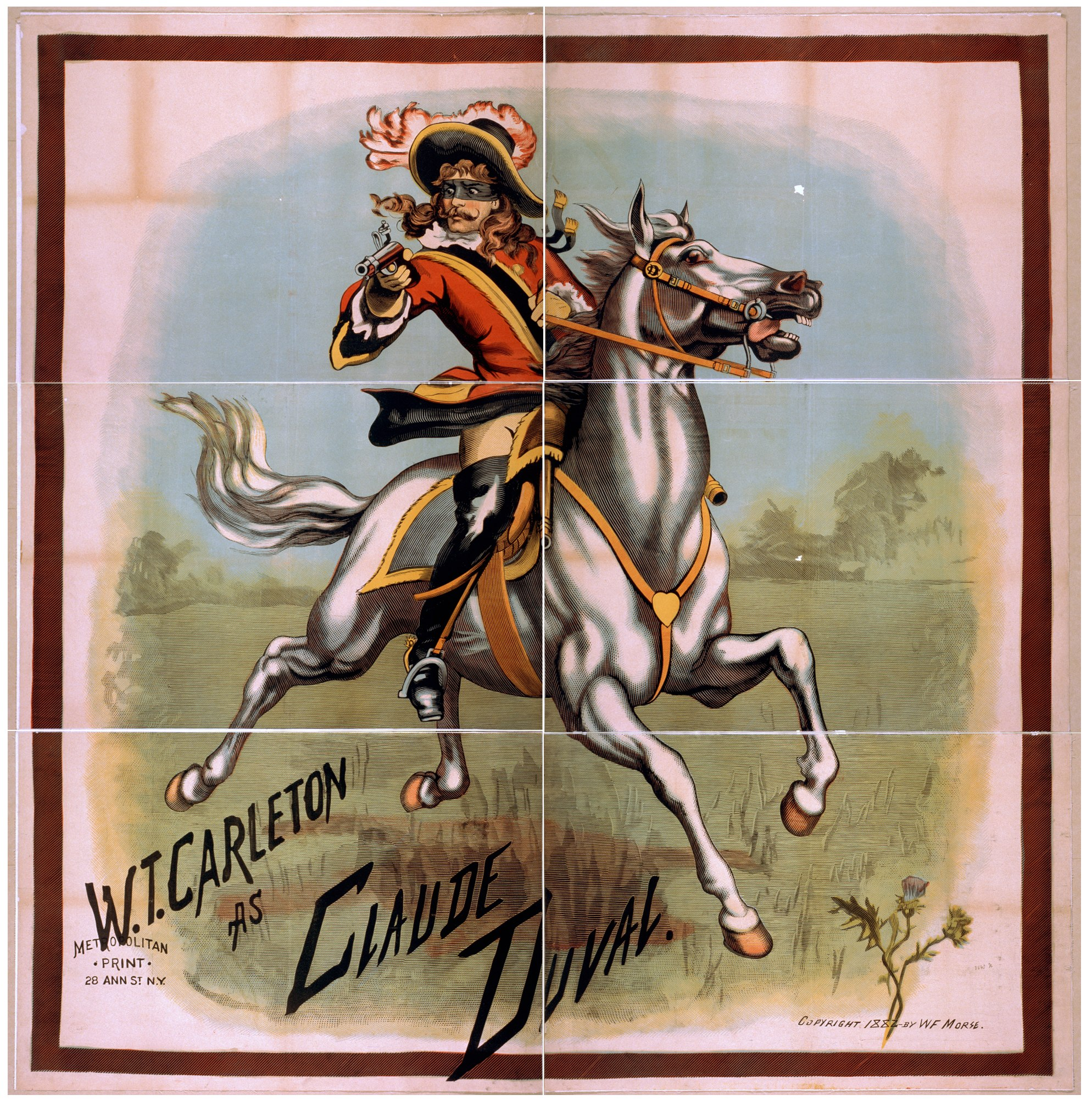
1882 poster of William T. Carleton in the New York production of Claude Duval

Claude Duval – or Love and Larceny is a comic opera with music by Edward Solomon to a libretto by Henry Pottinger Stephens. The plot is loosely based on supposed events in the life of the seventeenth century highwayman, Claude Duval.

The piece was first produced at the Olympic Theatre, London, on 24 August 1881, under the management of Michael Gunn. It ran until the end of October. From January to March 1882, a D'Oyly Carte touring company played the work in the British provinces. Another D'Oyly Carte company played it in New York in March and April 1882 under Richard D'Oyly Carte's personal supervision, in tandem with Gilbert and Sullivan's Patience. In New York, a few local references were interpolated into Blood-red Bill's comic song, "William's Sure to Be Right."

== Roles and early casts ==
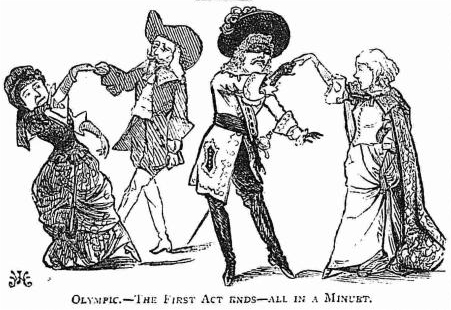
The minuet at the end of the first act: drawing from Fun magazine, 1881

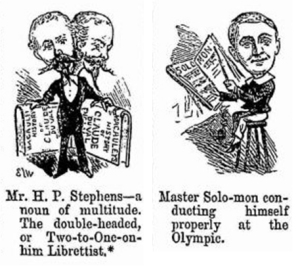
Librettist and composer caricatured in Punch's review of the first performance

- Claude Duval – F. H. Celli
- Charles Lorrimore – George Power
- Sir Whiffle Waffle – Arthur Williams
- Martin McGruder – Charles Ashford
- Captain Harleigh – Clarence M. Leumane
- Blood-red Bill – Fred Solomon
- Boscatt – Harold Russell
- Hodge – Mr. Goldie
- Podge – Cooper Cliffe
- Constance – Marion Hood
- Rose – Edith Blande
- Mistress Betty – Harriet Coveney
- Dolly – Nellie Sanson
- Mary – Daisy Foster
- Prudence – May Lennox
- Kenia – Violet Dare
- Barbara – Miss Beaumont

In the 1882 D'Oyly Carte tour, which played in Glasgow, Edinburgh, Aberdeen and Dundee, Duval was played by G. Byron Browne; Lorrimore by George Traverner; Blood-red Bill by George Thorne; McGruder by J. B Rae; Constance by Laura Clement; Rose by Kate Chard; Boscatt by H. Cooper Cliffe; and Mistress Betty by Miss Jones. Cooper Cliffe deputised for Browne who was taken ill in Edinburgh. In the New York company, Duval was played by William Carleton; Blood-red Bill by J. H. Ryley; Sir Whiffle Waffle by Arthur Wilkinson; and McGruder by W. H. Hamilton.

== Plot ==
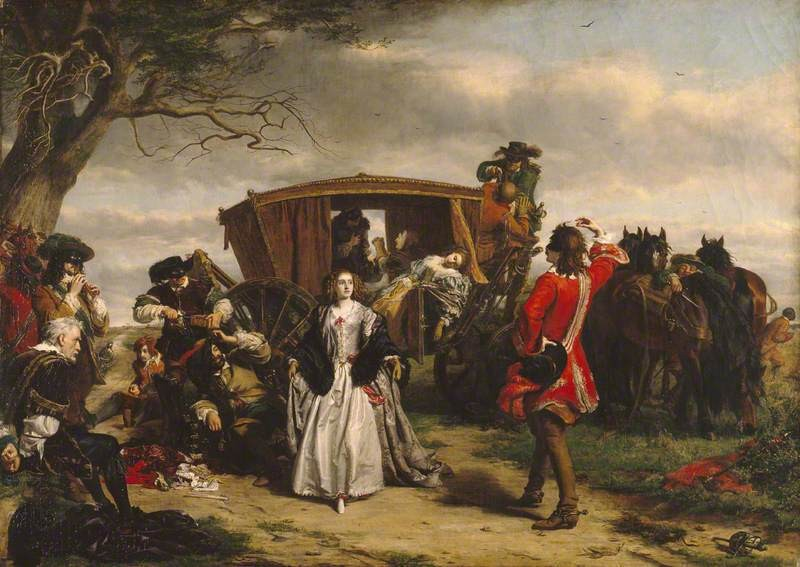
Claude Duval by William Powell Frith; this 1860 painting of Duvall's coach robbery was replicated in Act 1

The following synopsis is condensed from the plot summary printed in The Era's review of the premiere.

Act 1

In 1670 at Newmarket Heath, Duval's gang of highwaymen are disguised as gypsy fortune-tellers, and local maidens come to have their fortunes told. Charles Lorrimore arrives; he has attached himself to the losing faction at court and is fleeing from arrest. The gang captures him, but Duval has met Lorrimore before and likes him. Lorrimore tells Duval that he is in love with Constance, the niece of the old miser McGruder, who has gained possession of the Lorrimore estate. Soon a coach bearing McGruder and his two nieces crosses the Heath and is waylaid by the gang. Duval persuades Constance to dance a minuet with him and then she and her travelling companions are allowed to go on their way without further interference.

Act 2

On the village green of Milden Manor, Festivities are in progress to celebrate the forthcoming marriage of Constance to Sir Whiffle Waffle, a very rich and extremely silly baronet, the match being at her miserly uncle's insistence. There is a secret meeting between the lovers, and it is discovered that the military are approaching to arrest Lorrimore. Duval changes cloaks with him and is arrested in his stead.

Act 3

The highwaymen, disguised as guests, have infiltrated Milden Manor with a view to robbing it. In the Great Hall of the Manor, Duval's lieutenant, Blood-red Bill, charms McGruder's sister Betty into handing over the keys to a chest containing documents of great value. One document proves that the estates belong to Lorrimore, and another is a free pardon with the name of the beneficiary left blank. The estates are restored to Lorrimore, and Duval, having escaped from the military, writes Lorrimore's name in the pardon. All ends happily with the union of the lovers and the discomfiture of Sir Whiffle Waffle.

== Critical reception ==
The reviews of the original production were generally favourable. Some reservations were expressed about the libretto and the lack of comedy, but most critics praised the music, though some thought it derivative in parts. The staging was unreservedly praised. The New York Times wrote, "It is superbly put upon the stage, both as regards scenery and dresses, while the cast is even more attractive than that of Patience at the Opera Comique [but] … unlike the Gilbert and Sullivan work, there is a dull, sober earnestness about this opera. Celli was "as good a Duval as could well be imagined … vociferously encored"; Power and Hood as the lovers were generally well-received, though both were thought by some to be slightly lacking in personality.
