= Richard Watkins (MP) =

16th-century English politician

Richard Watkins (by 1507 – 1550), of London and Hunstrete, Somerset was an English politician.

He was a member (MP) of the parliament of England for Bramber in 1542 and for Bridport in 1545.
