= Francis Hawley, 2nd Baron Hawley =

Francis Hawley, 2nd Baron Hawley (c. 1673 – 30 May 1743), was a British landowner and politician.

Hawley was the son of the Honourable Francis Hawley by Gertrude Gethin, daughter of Sir Richard Gethin, 1st Baronet. He succeeded his grandfather Lord Hawley in the barony in 1684, also inheriting large estates in Berkshire, Devon, Dorset and Somerset. The barony was an Irish peerage and did not entitle him to a seat in the English House of Lords. He instead stood for election to the English House of Commons for Somerset in 1705 but was unsuccessful. However, in 1713 he was returned for Bramber, a seat he held until 1715. He did not stand for Parliament after 1715.

Lord Hawley married firstly Lady Elizabeth Ramsay, daughter of William Ramsay, 3rd Earl of Dalhousie, in 1697. After her death in 1713 he married secondly Elizabeth Hayes in 1718. He died in May 1743 and was succeeded by his son by his second wife, Francis. Lady Hawley died in 1745.

Parliament of Great Britain
Preceded by Andrews Windsor; William Shippen	Member of Parliament for Bramber; 1713–1715; With: Andrews Windsor	Succeeded by Sir Richard Gough; Sir Thomas Style, Bt
Peerage of Ireland
Preceded by Francis Hawley	Baron Hawley; 1684–1743	Succeeded by Francis Hawley
