= Francis Hawley, 1st Baron Hawley =

English politician, soldier and peer

Francis Hawley, 1st Baron Hawley (14 January 1608 – 22 December 1684) was an English politician, soldier and peer.

== Biography ==
Hawley was the son of Sir Henry Hawley of Wiveliscombe and Elizabeth, the daughter of Sir Anthony Poulett. He served as Commissioner of Array in Somerset in 1642. During the Civil War, Hawley was the colonel of a Royalist cavalry regiment that he raised to serve under Prince Rupert of the Rhine. Between 1643 and 1644 he was the Deputy Governor of Bristol. He was created a baronet, of Buckland in the County of Somerset, in the Baronetage of England in 1644. On 8 July 1645, Charles I raised Hawley to the peerage as Baron Hawley in the Peerage of Ireland. In October 1645, he obtained the Speaker's licence to go into exile with the Prince, and was subsequently compounded for his estates in 1647 by Oliver Cromwell.

Hawley returned to England upon the restoration of the monarchy in 1660. He was a captain in the Royal Horse Guards, commanding a troop, between 1661 and 1675, and was a keen supporter of the maintenance of a standing army. In 1665, he became the Member of Parliament for Mitchell, a position that he held until 1673. He was Captain of Deal Castle between 1672 and 1674. From 1669 until his death, Hawley was a Gentleman of the Bedchamber for the Duke of York. He served under the Duke during the Third Anglo-Dutch War.

He married Jane Gibbes, daughter of Sir Ralph Gibbes and Gertrude Wroughton. He was succeeded in his title by his grandson, Francis.

== See also ==
- Hawley baronets

Peerage of Ireland
New creation	Baron Hawley; 1645–1684	Succeeded by Francis Hawley
Baronetage of England
New creation	Baronet (of Buckland); 1644–1684	Succeeded by Francis Hawley
