= Holt Hotel (Oxfordshire) =

Hotel in Steeple Aston, Oxfordshire, England

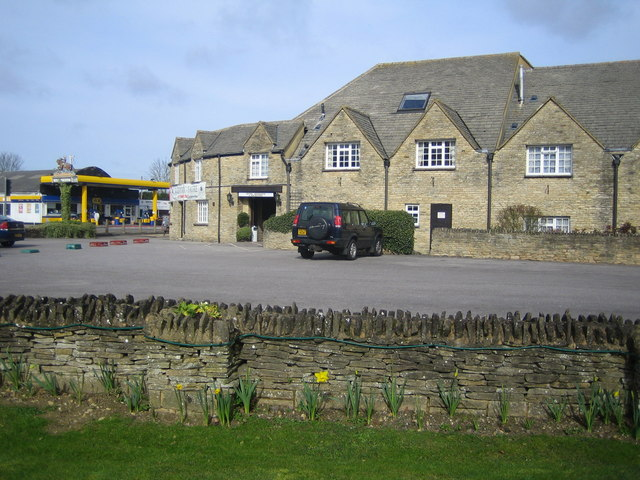

- Location within Oxfordshire

General information
- Location: Oxford Road, Steeple Aston, Oxfordshire, England, United Kingdom
- Coordinates: 51°55′20″N 1°19′25″W
- Opening: 1475

Other information
- Number of rooms: 86
- Number of restaurants: 2 (Bar & Restaurant)
- Parking: 200+ cars

Website
- The Holt

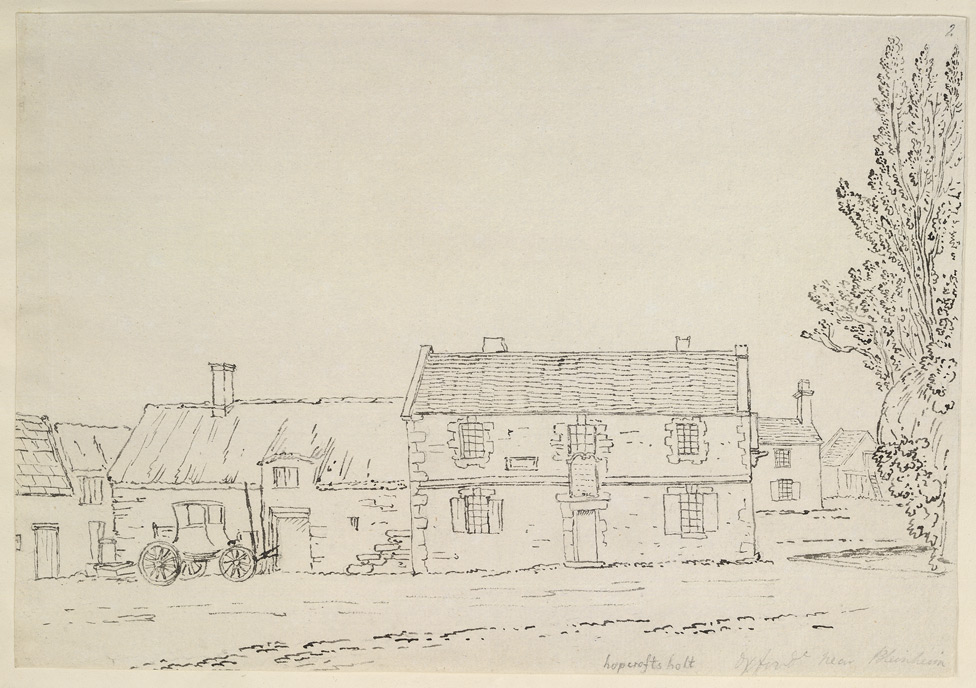
The establishment as a coaching inn in 1783, in a sketch by the Swiss artist Samuel Hieronymus Grimm

The Holt Hotel is an historic hotel near Steeple Aston, Oxfordshire, England. It is on the corner of the crossroads between the A4260 Oxford Road and the B4030, about 1 mile (1.6 km) southwest of Steeple Aston opposite a fuel station. It was founded in 1475 as a coaching inn with six rooms and now has 86 rooms. Its restaurant has been awarded a AA Rosette for quality cuisine.

The current building dates from about 1800 and the six gables at the front were added in 1938. It is built of local ironstone and has a Stonesfield Slate roof.

The 17th-century highwayman Claude Duval often stayed at the inn and is said to haunt the hotel. Room 3 in particular is said to have had many sightings of Duval and the hotel has been subject to paranormal investigations.

In 1754 the licensee and his wife at Hopcroft's Holt were murdered. By 1774 the inn was called the King's Arms, but the name was discontinued in the 1850s.
