= Andrews Windsor =

British Army officer

Brigadier-General The Honourable Andrews Windsor
- Born: 1678
- Died: 1765 (aged 86–87)

Brigadier-General Andrews Windsor (1678–1765), of Southampton, was a British Army officer and politician.

He was born the fourth son of Thomas Hickman-Windsor, 1st Earl of Plymouth and was the child of his father's second marriage to Ursula Widdrington, daughter of Sir Thomas Widdrington, Lord Chief Baron of the Exchequer. He was styled "The Honourable". His younger brothers were Dixie Windsor, MP and Thomas Windsor, 1st Viscount Windsor. He joined the army as a Cornet in the Royal Horse Guards in 1698, and was promoted captain and then lieutenant-colonel in the 1st Foot Guards in 1703, as a brevet-colonel in 1706 and colonel in 1709–1715 in the 28th Foot. He was finally made brigadier-general in 1711.

He was a Member (MP) of the Parliament of Great Britain for Bramber 1710 to 1715 and for Monmouth Boroughs 1720 to 1722. He inherited the Upper Avon Navigation from his father, who had acquired the rights to it from the future King James II of England.

He died unmarried in 1765.

Parliament of Great Britain
| Preceded by Cleave More Bt; William Hale | Member of Parliament for Bramber; October 1710 – January 1715; With: Thomas Windsor, 1st Viscount Windsor to December 1710; William Shippen 1710–13; Francis Hawley, 2nd Baron Hawley 1713–15 | Succeeded by Richard Gough; Thomas Style Bt |
| Preceded by William Bray | Member of Parliament for Monmouth Boroughs; 1720–1722 | Succeeded by Edward Kemeys |
