= John Baker (1488–1558) =

English politician (1488–1558)

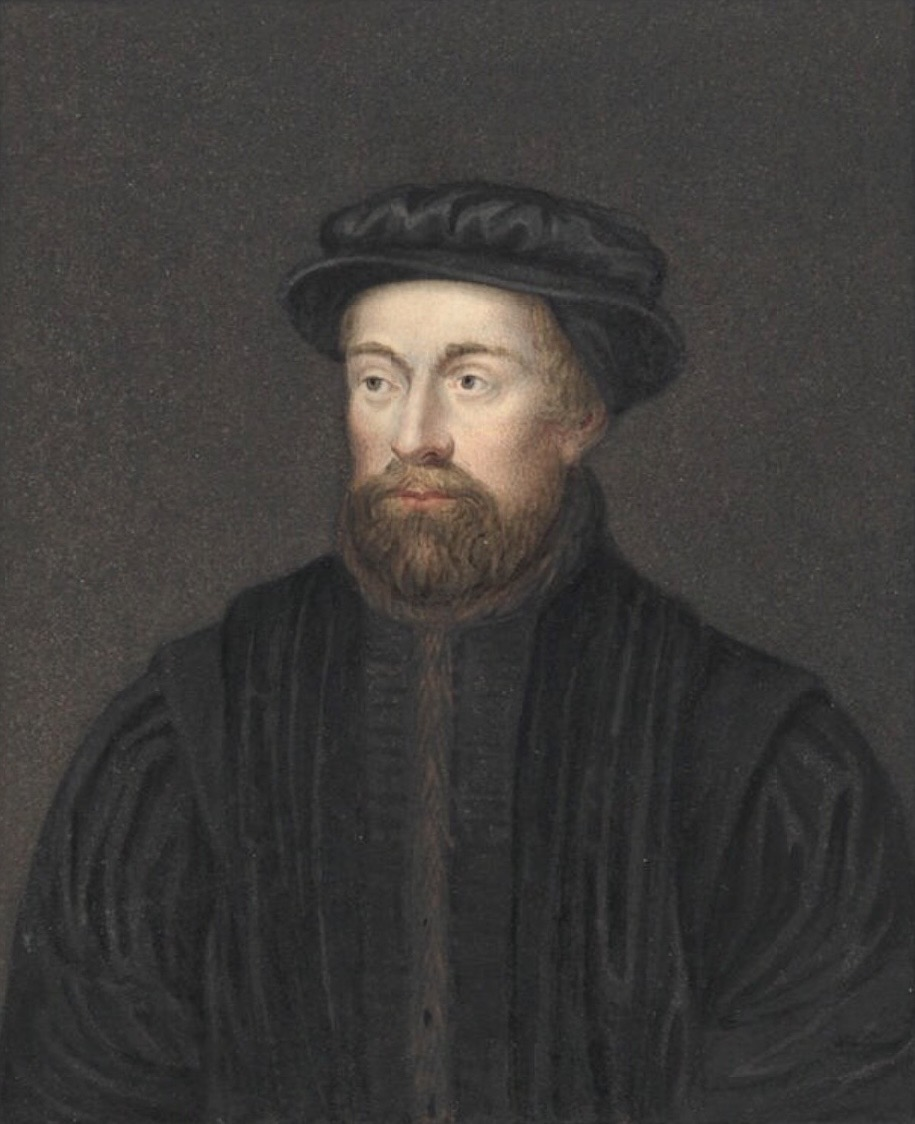

Chancellor of the Exchequer
- In office 1545–1558
- Preceded by: Thomas Cromwell
- Succeeded by: Richard Sackville

Speaker of the House of Commons
- In office November 1545 – 15 April 1552
- Preceded by: Thomas Moyle
- Succeeded by: James Dyer

Personal details
- Born: 1488
- Died: 23 December 1558 (aged 70)
- Spouse(s): Catherine Baker (died 1524) Elizabeth Baker

Sir John Baker (1488 – 23 December 1558) was an English politician. He served as Chancellor of the Exchequer from 1545 to his death, having previously been Speaker of the House of Commons of England.

== Early life ==
Baker was the grandson of Thomas and Benet Baker and the son of Richard and Johanne Baker — all of Cranbrook, Kent. He was educated for the legal profession in the Inner Temple, circa 1506.

== Career ==
In 1520 he was under-sheriff of London and in 1526 appointed Recorder of London, which he gave up to be attorney-general of the Duchy of Lancaster. He was appointed attorney general in 1536 and by 1540 sworn of the privy council of Henry VIII, Edward VI, Mary I, and Elizabeth I. He was knighted in June 1540 but gained no further preferment until 1545, when, having recommended himself to the king by his activity in forwarding a loan in London and other imposts, he was made Chancellor of the Exchequer. He served as Chancellor under three monarchs: Henry VIII, Edward VI and Mary.

He entered Parliament in 1529 and 1536 as MP for London, followed by terms as MP for Guildford in 1542 and Lancaster in 1545. He was then elected to Parliament in 1547 as knight of the shire for Huntingdonshire. He attained considerable eminence as Speaker of the House in both the 1545 and 1547 sessions. He afterwards represented Bramber (1553) and the county of Kent (1554, 1555 and 1557).

Baker had a reputation as a brutal persecutor of Protestants, earning the nickname 'Bloody Baker'. A legend arose that he was riding to persecute Protestants when he heard the news that Queen Mary had died. The place where he was said to have turned back became known as Baker's Cross in Kent.

== Personal life ==
Sir John married firstly Katherine, daughter of Richard Sackville of Withyham, East Sussex, and secondly Elizabeth, daughter and heir of Thomas Dingley of Stanford Dingley, Berkshire and Middle Aston, Oxfordshire, and widow of George Barrett of Belhouse, Aveley, Essex, by whom he had issue (two sons and three daughters). He kept a country estate at Sissinghurst Castle, Kent, on property his grandfather, Thomas Baker, had purchased.

His sons were Richard and John. His daughter Cicely married Thomas Sackville, 1st Earl of Dorset; among their many descendants was the writer Vita Sackville-West, who restored Sissinghurst and created the Sissinghurst Castle Garden. Another son of Sir John Baker (1488–1558) was Christopher Baker (1528–1628), who was an English captain of the ship 'Foresight' in battle against the Spanish Armada. Two American descendants of this line include Robert "The Gunsmith" Baker (1660–1728), who created the Kentucky Long Rifle, and Robert's grandson, Jesse Hughes (ca. 1750-ca. 1829), who was an American frontiersman, Scout in the American Revolutionary War, and settled part of West Virginia.

John Baker was the grandfather of Sir Richard Baker, the sixteenth-century historian.

== Death ==
He died in London in December 1558 less than a month after the death of Queen Mary. According to "Notes on the life of Sir John Baker of Sissinghurst", "January 1559, was buried in Kent, Sir John Baker, Knight, and Master of . . . ., with a standard and a coat armour, pennon of arms, IIII banners of saints and herse of wax, 7 dozen penselles, 10 dozen scutcheons, 12 torches; many mourners in black gowns, 2 great white branches, a herald of arms, a great dole and a great dinner."

Political offices
Preceded by Thomas Cromwell	Chancellor of the Exchequer; 1545–1558	Succeeded by Sir Richard Sackville
Political offices
Preceded by Sir Thomas Moyle	Speaker of the House of Commons; 1545–1552	Succeeded by Sir James Dyer
