= Nicholas Eversfield (MP for Bramber) =

English landowner and politician (c.1646–1684)

Nicholas Eversfield (c.1646–1684), of Charlton Court, Steyning, Sussex, was an English landowner and politician who sat in the House of Commons in 1679.

Eversfield was the only son of John Eversfield and his first wife Hester Knight, daughter of John Knight of Westergate, who brought him the wealth to buy Charlton Court. He married Elizabeth Gildridge, daughter of Nicholas Gildridge of Eastbourne on 29 June 1674.

Eversfield was Commissioner for assessment for Sussex from 1677 to 1680. He succeeded to his father's estate in 1678 and was returned as Member of Parliament for Bramber for the first Exclusion Parliament in 1679, probably on the interest of his cousins the Goring family. In the brief Parliament, he made no speeches, and did not sit on any committees.

Eversfield died in 1684 leaving a son and two daughters. He was succeeded by his son Charles who was MP for different Sussex constituencies between 1705 and 1747.

Parliament of England
| Preceded by Sir Cecil Bishopp, Bt; Percy Goring | Member of Parliament for Bramber; 1679; With: Henry Goring | Succeeded by Henry Goring; Henry Sydney |
