= John Farnfold =

English politician

John Farnfold was a Member of Parliament (MP) for Bramber and Steyning in 1399. The subject was a resident of the 'rape of Bramber', a Sussex tax collector and lessee of certain woodlands of the FitzAlan family.
