= Bramber (constituency) =

"Rotten" borough of the UK House of Commons (1472–1832)

- Former borough constituency for the House of Commons

1472–1832
- Seats: Two
- Replaced by: New Shoreham

Bramber was a parliamentary borough in Sussex, one of the most notorious of all the rotten boroughs. It elected two Members of Parliament (MPs) to the House of Commons in 1295, and again from 1472 until 1832, when the constituency was abolished by the Great Reform Act.

== History ==
The borough consisted of the former market town of Bramber on the River Adur, which by the 19th century had decayed to the size of a small village. Bramber was barely distinguishable from neighbouring Steyning, with which it shared a main street, and for a century and a half after 1295 they formed a single borough collectively returning MPs. From the reign of Edward IV, however, they returned two MPs each, even though one part of Bramber was in the centre of Steyning so that a single property could in theory give rise to a vote in both boroughs. They were never substantial enough towns to deserve enfranchisement on their own merits, and both probably owed their status to a royal desire to gratify the courtiers that owned them with a degree of influence in the House of Commons.

Bramber was a burgage borough – the vote was restricted to inhabitants of ancient houses in the borough, or those built on ancient foundations, who paid scot and lot. In 1816 this amounted to only 20 voters, although as in 1831 the borough contained 35 houses and a population of approximately 170, this was a much higher proportion of the residents than in most burgage boroughs.

Bramber was slightly unusual in that the vote was accorded to the occupier rather than the owner of the burgage tenements, but in practice the owners had total control over the votes of their tenants – by bribery if not by threats – and therefore of elections in the borough. In Tudor times, the Dukes of Norfolk seem to have held sway. By the first half of the 18th century Bramber was wholly owned by Sir Harry Gough, who leased it (and the right to nominate its MPs) to Lord Archer; Lord Archer sold this right onwards in his turn, apparently being paid £1000 by the government to allow Lord Malpas to be elected in 1754. In 1768 the Duke of Rutland gained control, but Gough later regained power over one of the two seats and it was inherited by his descendants (who held the title Lord Calthorpe). These two families still shared the representation at the time of the Reform Act.

Bramber was abolished as a separate constituency with effect from the 1832 general election. However, the nearby borough of New Shoreham had already been expanded to include the whole of the Rape of Bramber as an antidote to its corruption, and survived the Reform Act with both its MPs intact. Bramber therefore formed part of the New Shoreham constituency from 1832.

== Members of Parliament ==
=== Before 1640 ===
Parliament	First member	Second member
1399	Robert Couk	John Farnfold
1510–1523	No names known	
1529	Henry See	William Roper
1536	?	
1539	?	
1542	Sir John Clere	?Richard Watkins
1545	Sir John Clere	John Gilmyn
1547	Sir William Sharington	John Fylde
by 23 Jan 1552	Chidiock Paulet	Richard Bunny
1553 (Mar)	George Rithe	Lawrence Awen
1553 (Oct)	Sir John Baker	Thomas Timperley
1554 (Apr)	Sir Henry Palmer	John Story
1554 (Nov)	Thomas Elrington	John Baker
1555	Sir Thomas Knyvet	John Baker or Thomas Baker
1558	Henry Mynn	Nicholas Mynn
1559	Sir Henry Gates	Robert Buxton
1562/3	William Barker	Robert Balam
1571	Bartholomew Clerke	Robert Wiseman
1572	Hugh Hare	Henry Clerke
1584	Nicholas Beaumont	Sampson Lennard
1586	William Towse	John Porter
1588	James Altham	John Osborne
1593	Samuel Thornhill	Edward Michelborne
1597	Nicholas Trott	William Comber
1601	Sir Thomas Shirley, sat for Hastings and replaced Nov 1601 by Henry Lok	Henry Bowyer
1604	Sir John Shurley	Henry Shelley
1614	Sir John Leedes	Henry Shelley^{Son of Member for 1604}
1621	(Sir) Thomas Bowyer	Robert Morley
1624	(Sir) Thomas Bowyer	Robert Morley
1625	Walter Barttelot	(Sir) Thomas Bowyer
1626	Walter Barttelot	(Sir) Thomas Bowyer
1628–1629	Sir Sackville Crowe	(Sir) Thomas Bowyer
1629–1640	No Parliaments summoned	

=== 1640–1832 ===
Year	First member	First party	Second member	Second party
April 1640	Sir Edward Bishopp		Sir Thomas Bowyer	Royalist
November 1640	Sir Edward Bishopp		Arthur Onslow	Parliamentarian
December 1640	Sir Thomas Bowyer	Royalist	Arthur Onslow	Parliamentarian
November 1642	Bowyer disabled from sitting – seat vacant		Arthur Onslow	Parliamentarian
September 1645	James Temple		Arthur Onslow	Parliamentarian
December 1648	James Temple		Onslow excluded in Pride's Purge – seat vacant	
1653	Bramber was unrepresented in the Barebones Parliament and the First and Second Parliaments of the Protectorate			
January 1659	John Byne		John Fagg	
May 1659	James Temple		One seat vacant	
1660	John Byne		Edward Eversfield	
1661	John Byne		Percy Goring	
1662	Sir Cecil Bishopp		Percy Goring	
February 1679	Henry Goring		Nicholas Eversfield	
August 1679	Henry Goring		Henry Sidney	
1681	Henry Goring		Percy Goring	
1685	Sir Thomas Bludworth		William Bridgeman	
1689	John Alford		Charles Goring	
1690	Nicholas Barbon		John Radcliffe	
1695	Nicholas Barbon		William Stringer	
1698	Sir Henry Furnese		William Westbrooke	
February 1699	John Courthope		William Westbrooke	
April 1699	John Asgill		William Westbrooke	
January 1701	Thomas Stringer		Thomas Owen	
March 1701	Francis Seymour-Conway		Thomas Owen	
1702	Francis Seymour-Conway		John Asgill	
1703	John Middleton		John Asgill	
1704	Samuel Vanacker Sambrooke		John Asgill	
1705	The Viscount Windsor		John Asgill	
1707	The Viscount Windsor		William Shippen	
1709	William Hale		Sir Cleave More	
October 1710	The Viscount Windsor		Andrews Windsor	
December 1710	William Shippen		Andrews Windsor	
1713	The Lord Hawley		Andrews Windsor	
January 1715	Sir Richard Gough		Sir Thomas Style	
June 1715	Sir Richard Gough		Edward Minshull	
1722	Sir Richard Gough		William Charles van Huls	
1723	Sir Richard Gough		David Polhill	
1727	Sir Richard Gough		Joseph Danvers	
March 1728	John Gumley		Joseph Danvers	
April 1728	James Hoste		Joseph Danvers	
1734	Sir Harry Gough		Harry Gough (senior)	
1741	Thomas Archer		Harry Gough (senior)	
1747	Joseph Damer		Harry Gough (senior)	
1751	Joseph Damer		Henry Pelham	Whig
1754	Viscount Malpas		Nathaniel Newnham	
March 1761	Hon. Andrew Archer		William Fitzherbert	
December 1761	The Lord Winterton		William Fitzherbert	
1762	The Lord Winterton		Hon. George Venables-Vernon	
1768	The Lord Winterton		Charles Lowndes	
1769	Thomas Thoroton		Charles Ambler	
1774	Thomas Thoroton		Sir Henry Gough	
1782	Hon. Henry Fitzroy Stanhope		Sir Henry Gough	
1784	Daniel Pulteney		Sir Henry Gough	
1788	Robert Hobart		Sir Henry Gough	
1790	Thomas Coxhead		Sir Henry Gough	
1796	Sir Charles Rouse-Boughton		James Adams	
1800	John Henry Newbolt		James Adams	
1802	George Manners-Sutton		Henry Jodrell	
1804	Richard Norman		Henry Jodrell	
1806	John Irving		Henry Jodrell	
1812	John Irving		William Wilberforce	Independent
1825	John Irving		Arthur Gough-Calthorpe	
1826	John Irving		Frederick Gough-Calthorpe	
1831	John Irving		William Stratford Dugdale	
1832	Constituency abolished			
