= John Baker (by 1531 – between 1604 and 1606) =

English politician

John Baker (by 1531 – between 1604 and 1606) was an English politician.

== Family ==
John Baker, born by 1531, was the second son of Sir John Baker, Chancellor of the Exchequer and his second wife Elizabeth Dineley. He had an elder brother, Sir Richard Baker, and three sisters, one of whom, Cecily, married Thomas Sackville, Lord Buckhurst.

== Career ==
Baker was admitted to the Inner Temple on 29 January 1553.

He was a Member (MP) of the Parliament of England for Horsham in April 1554 and Bramber in November 1554 and 1555.

== Marriages and issue ==
Baker married firstly Katherine Scott, the daughter of Sir Reginald Scott (d. 16 December 1554) of Scot's Hall near Ashford, Kent, and Emeline Kempe, the daughter of Sir William Kempe of Olantigh by Eleanor, daughter of Sir Robert Browne, by whom he had two sons, one of whom was the chronicler, Richard Baker. He married secondly a wife named Martha formally called Lady Marjorie Madistard (1547 - 1617)
