= Henry Gunning =

Cambridge University official (1768–1854)

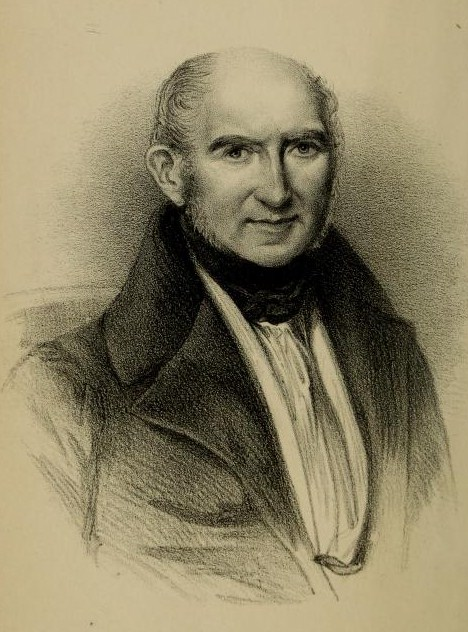
Henry Gunning

Henry Gunning (13 February 1768, Newton, South Cambridgeshire – 4 January 1854, Brighton) was senior Esquire Bedell of the University of Cambridge, known for his memoirs.

== Life ==
Gunning was born at Newton, South Cambridgeshire, on 13 February 1768. His father, Francis Gunning, who was vicar of Newton and also of the adjacent parishes of Thriplow and Hauxton, was grandson of William Gunning, the first cousin and secretary of Peter Gunning, successively bishop of Chichester and Ely. Henry was educated first at Ely, in a school kept by Jeffrey Bentham, a minor canon of the cathedral, and brother of James Bentham; and afterwards in the endowed school of Sleaford, under the Rev. Edward Waterson. He entered Christ's College, Cambridge, as a sizar in October 1784, became a scholar of that house, and graduated B.A. as sixth wrangler in 1788 (M.A. 1791). On 13 October 1789 he was elected one of the esquire bedells of the university. He became senior esquire bedell in 1827. In that capacity he received gold chains from three successive chancellors of the university, viz. John Pratt, 1st Marquess Camden, 1834, the Duke of Northumberland, 1844, and Prince Albert, 1847.

An advanced Whig in politics, Gunning took an active part in local politics, was a strenuous supporter of the cause of parliamentary reform, and, after the passing of the Municipal Corporations Act, was from 1835 to 1841 a member of the town council of Cambridge. In 1847 an accidental fall left him incurably lame. His official connection with the university continued for more than sixty-five years. He was highly esteemed for his courtesy, gentlemanly bearing, and readiness to communicate his extensive knowledge respecting academic ceremonies and privileges. He died in Brighton on 4 January 1854.

== Works ==
Gunning's major literary work was Reminiscences of the University, Town, and County of Cambridge from the year 1780 [to 1820], 2 vols. London, 1854. He did not begin these sketches until he was over 80 years old. The work was published posthumously; it had been dictated to an amanuensis, Miss M. Beart, who prepared it for publication. Prefixed to the first volume is a portrait of the author, lithographed by Day & Son. A portrait of him, in oil, painted by Dr. Woodhouse, is in the possession of Mrs. Cooper of Cambridge, widow of Charles Henry Cooper. Gunning also prepared a new edition of Adam Wall's Ceremonies observed in the Senate House of the University of Cambridge, Cambridge, 1828, and wrote a pamphlet on Compositions for Degrees, 1850.

== Family ==
Gunning married in 1794 Miss Bertram, whom he survived many years. His eldest son, and the only one who survived him, was Henry Bertram Gunning of Little Shelford, Cambridgeshire, a charity commissioner and an assistant tithe commissioner. Another son, Francis John Gunning, was a solicitor and town clerk of Cambridge from 1836 to 1840; and a third son, Frederick Gunning, was a barrister in practice on the Norfolk circuit, and the author of A Practical Treatise on the Law of Tolls, London, 1833.
