= Claude Duval (painting) =

Painting by William Powell Frith

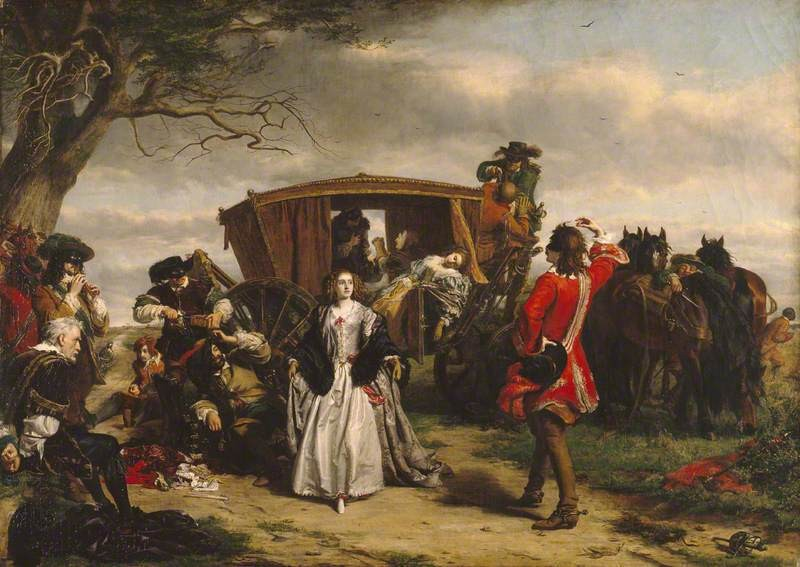
- Artist: William Powell Frith
- Year: 1860
- Type: Oil on canvas, history painting
- Dimensions: 108.8 cm × 153 cm (42.8 in × 60 in)
- Location: Manchester Art Gallery, Manchester

Claude Duval is an oil on canvas history painting by the British artist William Powell Frith, from 1860. It depicts the French highwaymen Claude Duval who operated in Restoration England. He is shown holding up a coach on a heath.

== History and description ==
The story is taken from The History of England by Thomas Babington Macaulay. Frith began making sketches for it while he was on holiday in Weymouth in 1858. The central female character depicted is Lady Aurora Sydney. Reputedly Duval gallantly asked her to dance the coranto rather than rob her.

Frith exhibited it at the Royal Academy's Summer Exhibition in 1860. The painting was bought by the picture dealer Louis Victor Flatlow in 1859, signing a contract for the picture (£850), a smaller version (£250), and a third from which an engraver would work.

The larger painting is held in the Manchester Art Gallery. The engraver Lumb Stocks produced a print based on the painting, and presented it to the Royal Academy when he was elected in 1871. The smaller second version was made in 1886.

== Bibliography ==
- Bills, Mark & Knight, Vivien (ed.) William Powell Frith: Painting the Victorian Age. Yale University Press, 2006
- Green, Richard & Sellars, Jane. William Powell Frith: The People's Painter. Bloomsbury, 2019.
- Noakes, Aubrey. William Frith, Extraordinary Victorian Painter. Jupiter, 1978.
- Richards, Jeffrey. Swordsmen of the Screen: From Douglas Fairbanks to Michael York. Routledge, 2014.
- Wood, Christopher. William Powell Frith: A Painter and His World. Sutton Publishing, 2006.
