= Claude Duval =

French highwayman

Claude Deval
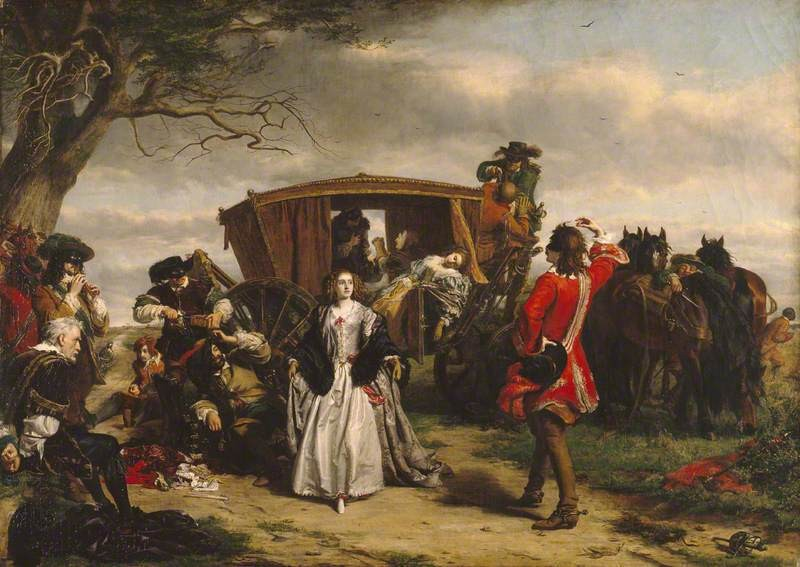
- William Powell Frith's 1860 painting, Claude Duval
- Born: c. 1643; Domfront, Orne, Normandy, France
- Died: 21 January 1670 (aged 26–27); Tyburn Tree Gallows, Middlesex, London, England
- Resting place: St Paul's, Covent Garden, London, England
- Other name: Claude Duvall
- Occupations: servant, highwayman
- Known for: French-born highwayman in post-Restoration Britain

Claude Du Vall (or Duval) (c. 1643 – 21 January 1670) was a French highwayman in Restoration England. He worked in the service of exiled royalists who returned to England under King Charles II. Little else is known of his history. According to popular legend, he abhorred violence, showing courtesy to his victims and chivalry to their womenfolk, thus spawning the myth of the romantic highwayman, as taken up by many novelists and playwrights.

== Early life ==
Per one account, Claude Duval was born in Domfront, Orne, Normandy in about 1643 to Pierre Duval, a miller, and Marguerite, daughter of a tailor. A 'family fable suggested' they were once 'landed lords, but there was little evidence left to show for it'. His origin and parentage are in dispute. He did, however, have a brother, Daniel Duval. At the age of 14 he was sent to Paris where he worked as a domestic servant. He later became a stable boy for a group of English royalists and moved to England in the time of the English Restoration as a footman of the Duke of Richmond (possibly a relation) and rented a house in Wokingham.

== Highwayman ==
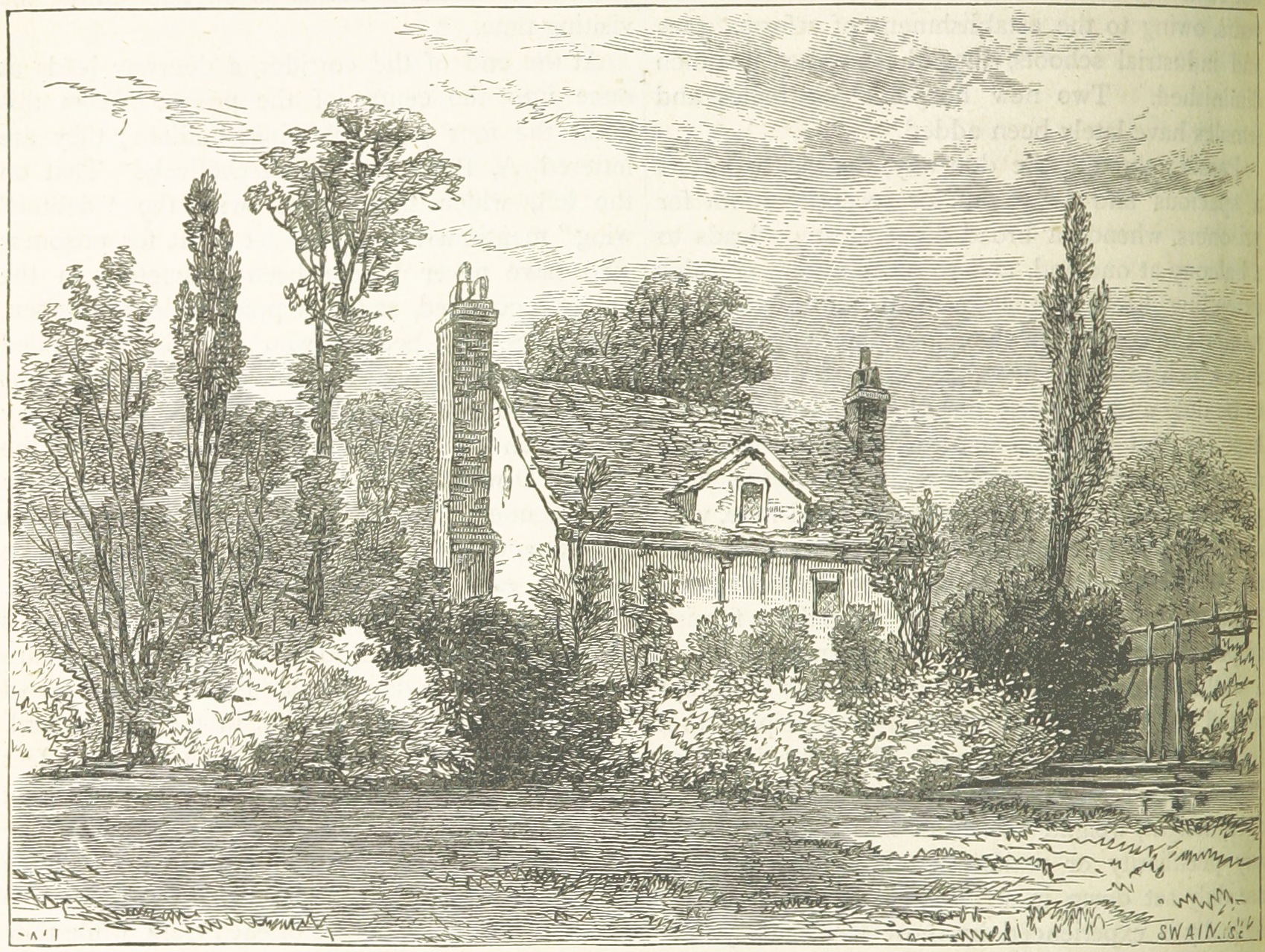
Claude Duval's House, in Holloway, 1825

The legend goes that before long, Duval became a successful highwayman who robbed the passing stagecoaches on the roads to London, especially Holloway between Highgate and Islington and, that unlike most other highwaymen, he distinguished himself with rather gentlemanly behaviour and fashionable clothes.

He reputedly never used violence. One of his victims was Squire Roper, Master of the Royal Buckhounds, whom he relieved of 50 guineas and tied to a tree.

There are many tales about Duval. A particularly famous one – placed in more than one location and later published by William Pope – claims that he took only a part of his potential loot from a gentleman, when the man's wife agreed to dance the "courante" with him in the wayside, a scene immortalised by William Powell Frith in his 1860 painting Claude Duval.

If his intention was to deter pursuit by his non-threatening behaviour, he did not totally succeed. After the authorities promised a large reward, he fled to France for some time but returned a few months later. Shortly afterwards, he is said to have been arrested in the Hole-in-the-Wall tavern in London's Chandos Street, Covent Garden.

== Execution ==
On 17 January 1670, judge Sir William Morton found him guilty of six robberies (others remained unproven) and sentenced him to death. Despite many attempts to intercede, the King did not pardon him and he was executed on 21 January at Tyburn. When his body was cut down and exhibited in Tangier Tavern, it drew a large crowd. It is traditionally thought Duval was buried under the centre aisle of the church of St Paul's, Covent Garden; the parish register notes the burial of a "Peter Duval" in January 1670.

A memorial at the church reads:

Here lies DuVall: Reder, if male thou art,
Look to thy purse; if female, to thy heart.
Much havoc has he made of both; for all
Men he made to stand, and women he made to fall
The second Conqueror of the Norman race,
Knights to his arm did yield, and ladies to his face.
Old Tyburn’s glory; England’s illustrious Thief,
Du Vall, the ladies' joy; Du Vall, the ladies' grief.

The apparently gallant highwayman inspired a number of biographers and playwrights to add to his legend, including claims of alchemy, gambling, and much womanising.

He is reported to haunt the Holt Hotel along the A4260 (Oxford Road) in Oxfordshire, a hotel where he spent many nights when it was a small coaching inn.

== Popular culture ==
Recent historians have reappraised the legacy of Duval. James Sharpe in Dick Turpin regarded Duval as the most significant figure in the shaping of the highwayman myth. John and Philip Sugden's The Thief of Hearts reconstructs what is known of the historical Duval, using much fresh evidence, and shows that the traditions about the Frenchman were used by such literary luminaries as Samuel Butler (A Pindarick Ode), John Gay (The Beggar's Opera) and William Harrison Ainsworth (Rookwood and Talbot Harland) to create the iconic image of the gentleman highwayman still beloved today.

- "As he reached this spot, a man started from the obscurity, and requested with the politeness of a Claude Duval to know the time." From Mountains and Molehills; or, Recollections of a Burnt Journal, 1855, by Francis Samuel Marryat, (1826–1855).
- A comic opera called Claude Duval was written in 1881 by Edward Solomon and Henry Pottinger Stephens and enjoyed success both in Britain and in America.
- In Mary Hooper's book The Remarkable Life and Times of Eliza Rose, Duval is said to be a friend of Nell Gwyn and is credited with saving King Charles II of England's life.
- A public house in the town of Camberley in Surrey is named in his honour.
- From 1953 to 1959 the British comic The Comet ran a popular strip about Duval, making him older than in reality so that he could be a Royalist officer during the Civil War and a Royalist agent during the Commonwealth and Protectorate. Comet's "Claude Duval The Laughing Cavalier" was also published as a stand-alone Thriller Comics Library comic book in 1955.
- The Comet comic strip was sufficiently successful that in 1956 film director-producer George King devised a television series called The Gay Cavalier featuring Duval (played by French actor Christian Marquand) and another character from the comic, the Cromwellian intelligence officer Major Midas Mould (played by Ivan Craig). The series was made by Associated-Rediffusion and broadcast from May to August 1957. Despite having starred such actors as Christopher Lee and Nigel Stock, none of the 13 episodes appears to have survived.
- A 2005 Travel Channel Haunted Hotels documentary on hauntings claims that Claude Duval's ghost presently haunts the Holt Hotel, the tavern wherein he was arrested before being condemned to death. This same documentary also claims several people were murdered by Duval, despite scant evidence.
- Michelle Lowe's novel, Cherished Thief, published in 2012, depicts Claude DuVal's entire life story.
- In Arthur Conan Doyle's short story One Crowded Hour, a victim of a chivalrous highway robber rebukes the robber, saying, "Don't come the Claude Duval over us."
- He was the subject of London Dungeon exhibition in May 2015.
- Is a subject in the podcast radio-play Adventures of Sage & Savant Episode 206
