= A4260 road =

Road in northern Oxfordshire, England

Coordinates: 51.9523°N 1.3186°W

A4260

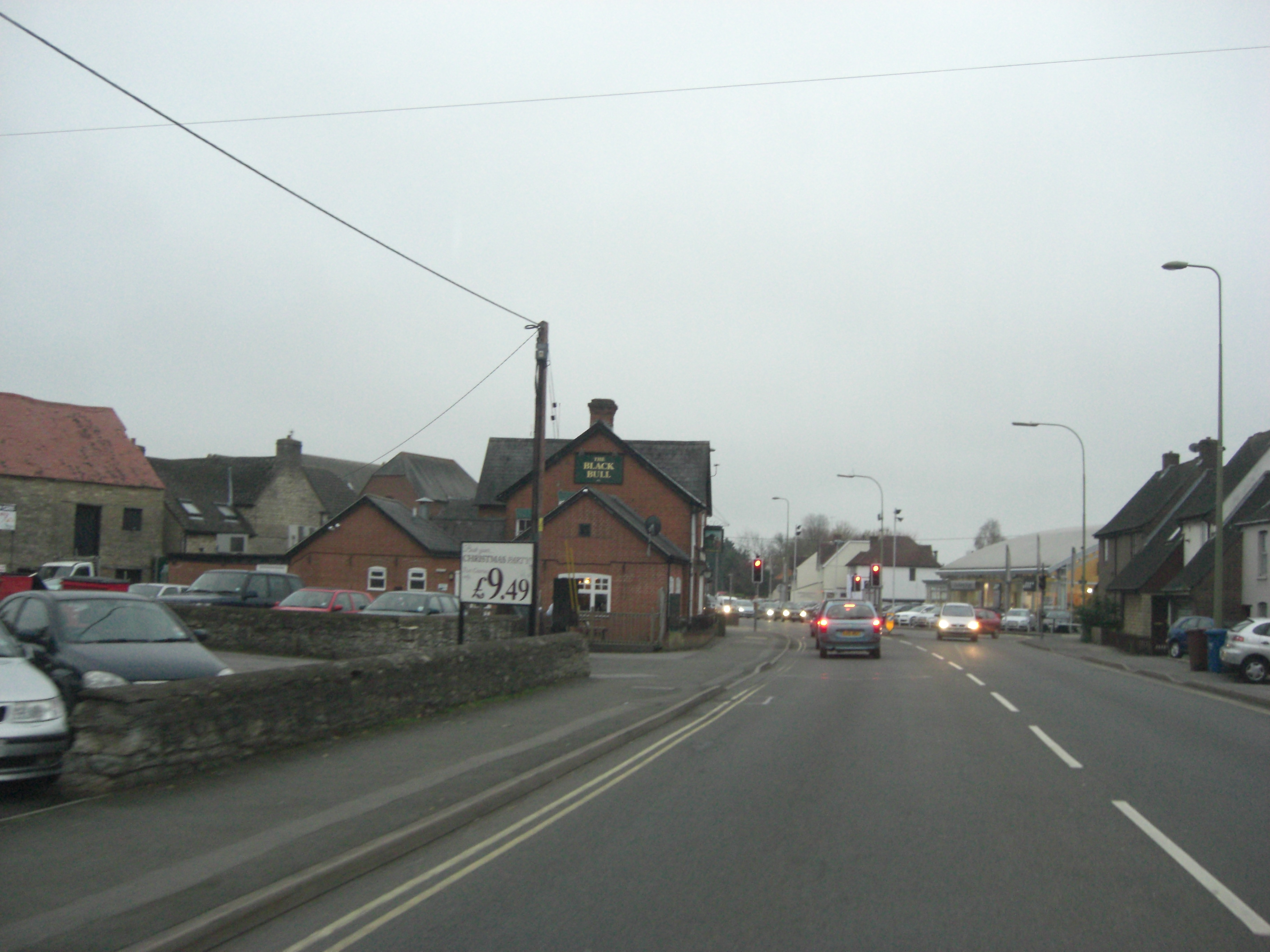
- A4260 junction with Lyne Road

Route information
- Length: 20 mi (32 km)

Major junctions
- North end: Banbury
- A422 A4095 A4165; A44
- South end: Oxford

Location
- Country: United Kingdom
- Constituent country: England

Road network
- Roads in the United Kingdom; Motorways; A and B road zones
← A4259	→ A4280

The A4260 is a road that leads from the A422 Henneff Way, Banbury, to Frieze Way near Oxford, England.

== History ==
=== Romans ===
The route followed by the road is that of a prehistoric ridgeway between the valleys of the rivers Cherwell and Evenlode. The Romans adopted the route and paved it from north of Oxford to Akeman Street at Sturdy's Castle.

=== Medieval period & turnpiking ===
The route remained in use through the medieval period, as described by John Ogilby in 1675, as the primary way between Oxford and Banbury. In the 18th century, the route was turnpiked.

=== Post-1922 road lists ===
Until 1990, the road was part of the A423 and the major route from Banbury to Oxford. It was renumbered to encourage the traffic that formerly used this route to use the M40.
