= Yellowjackets season 2 =

Season of television series

Yellowjackets
- Season 2
- Promotional poster
- Starring: Melanie Lynskey; Tawny Cypress; Sophie Nélisse; Jasmin Savoy Brown; Sophie Thatcher; Samantha Hanratty; Steven Krueger; Warren Kole; Courtney Eaton; Liv Hewson; Kevin Alves; Simone Kessell; Lauren Ambrose; Christina Ricci; Juliette Lewis
- No. of episodes: 9

Release
- Original network: Showtime
- Original release: March 26 – May 28, 2023

Season chronology
- ← Previous; Season 1 Next → Season 3

The second season of the American thriller drama television series Yellowjackets premiered on Showtime on March 26, 2023. Series creators Ashley Lyle and Bart Nickerson serve as the showrunners for the season, alongside executive producer Jonathan Lisco. The series is centered on the teenage survivors of a 1996 plane crash in the wilderness. The narrative is set in dual timelines: the first follows the teens in the 1990s as they must learn to survive in the wild after the crash, while the second takes place 25 years later and focuses on the survivors' attempts to readjust after rescue and confront the truth about what they did to survive. The second season follows the teen Yellowjackets during their first winter as the adult Yellowjackets search for a missing Natalie and try to cover up Shauna's crime.

The ensemble cast includes Melanie Lynskey, Tawny Cypress, Sophie Nélisse, Jasmin Savoy Brown, Sophie Thatcher, Samantha Hanratty, Steven Krueger, Warren Kole, Juliette Lewis, and Christina Ricci, who all return from the previous season. Simone Kessell, Lauren Ambrose, and Elijah Wood joined the cast, while Courtney Eaton, Liv Hewson, and Kevin Alves were promoted to the main cast after featuring in recurring roles in the previous season.

In December 2021, during Yellowjackets' first season, Showtime renewed the series. The second season consists of nine episodes. New episodes were made available to Showtime subscribers on its streaming service two days prior to the linear TV date. Though reviews were generally positive, with praise for the cast and characters, critics also voiced growing concerns about the mystery plot lines, pacing and character development.

== Cast ==
=== Main ===
- Melanie Lynskey as Shauna Sadecki, née Shipman
  - Sophie Nélisse as teen Shauna
- Tawny Cypress as Taissa Turner
  - Jasmin Savoy Brown as teen Taissa
- Christina Ricci as Misty Quigley
  - Samantha Hanratty as teen Misty
- Juliette Lewis as Natalie "Nat" Scatorccio
  - Sophie Thatcher as teen Natalie
- Steven Krueger as Ben Scott
- Warren Kole as Jeff Sadecki
- Simone Kessell as Lottie Matthews
  - Courtney Eaton as teen Lottie
- Lauren Ambrose as Vanessa "Van" Palmer
  - Liv Hewson as teen Van
- Kevin Alves as Travis Martinez

=== Recurring ===
- Alexa Barajas as Mari Ibarra
- Sarah Desjardins as Callie Sadecki
- Nicole Maines as Lisa
- Nuha Jes Izman as Crystal
- Mya Lowe as Gen
- Jenna Burgess as Melissa Kaplan
- Nia Sondaya as Akilah
- Elijah Wood as Walter Tattersall
- Alex Wyndham as Kevyn Tan
- John Reynolds as Matt Saracusa
- François Arnaud as Paul
- Rukiya Bernard as Simone Abara
- Luciano Leroux as Javi Martinez
- Aiden Stoxx as Sammy Abara-Turner

=== Guest ===
- Ella Purnell as Jackie Taylor
- Jane Widdop as Laura Lee
- Owen Gates as teen Jeff
- John Cameron Mitchell as Caligula

== Episodes ==
No. overall	No. in season	Title	Directed by	Written by	Original release date (Note: Episodes were made available for viewers on the standalone Showtime streaming app two days prior to the cable TV airing.)	U.S. viewers (millions)
11	1	"Friends, Romans, Countrymen"	Daisy von Scherler Mayer	Ashley Lyle & Bart Nickerson	March 26, 2023	0.226
Two months after Jackie's death, the group of survivors are struggling to make it through winter. Lottie has taken on a spiritual leader role. Natalie and Travis are unsuccessful in hunting food and locating a missing Javi. Meanwhile, a pregnant Shauna spends her time talking to Jackie's frozen corpse. During one visit, Jackie's ear rips off and Shauna later secretly eats it. Van ties her wrist to Taissa's at night to prevent her from sleepwalking. Misty, still ostracized after the mushroom incident, bonds with Crystal, a member of the JV girls team. Lottie talks Travis down from a panic attack with strange visions. In the present day, Shauna and Jeff cover their involvement in Adam's murder by destroying his personal art studio and burning his identification, along with Shauna's journals. Callie uncovers the remains of Adam's charred ID. Simone warns Taissa to stay away from Sammy; Taissa later finds the altar she unknowingly constructed in the basement. Misty begins searching for Natalie's whereabouts and notices she was likely taken by force. She attempts to ward off a fellow Citizen Detective investigating Adam's disappearance. Natalie finds herself held hostage in a wellness commune run by Lottie and manages to confront her.
12	2	"Edible Complex"	Ben Semanoff	Jonathan Lisco	April 2, 2023	N/A
Shauna continues to talk to Jackie's corpse, even to the point of dressing it up with makeup; Jackie's ghost taunts her about how hungry she is. Taissa insists that it is time to cremate Jackie and move on. Van saves Taissa from sleepwalking off a cliff; she recommends they talk to Lottie, but Taissa refuses. Natalie fakes Javi's death to Travis by smearing a pair of his shorts with her own blood. Jackie's body is burned on a pyre, but a deluge of snow slows the flame and cooks the body. Succumbing to their hunger, the team eats her corpse, while Coach Ben watches in horror. In the present, Shauna is questioned by Kevyn about Adam's disappearance. Callie flirts with a man named Matt who, unbeknownst to her, is a detective working with Kevyn. The anonymous Citizen Detective locates Misty at her job and invites her to join him on Adam's case. Sammy visits Taissa unprompted, but when Simone arrives to pick him up, they cannot find him. Taissa and Simone are involved in a car accident after it is revealed Taissa had hallucinated Sammy's visit. Lottie tells Natalie about Travis's death, but Natalie suspects she is hiding the truth.
13	3	"Digestif"	Jeffrey W. Byrd	Sarah L. Thompson & Ameni Rozsa	April 9, 2023	0.210
Taissa has no memory of eating Jackie and is horrified to learn she participated while in her fugue state. Natalie disposes of Jackie's remains at the crash site; she encounters a white moose, but it disappears as she tries to shoot it. A sleepwalking Taissa tells Van about "The One with No Eyes". Misty strengthens her bond with Crystal. A delirious Ben imagines life if he had stayed behind with his boyfriend Paul. The team throws Shauna a baby shower, but birds begin to fall from the sky when her nose bleeds on the symbol stitched into her blanket. Lottie suggests they are blessings from the woods. In the present, Shauna and Jeff are carjacked, but Shauna disarms the perpetrator before he drives off. She tracks down the car at a scrapyard and intimidates the owner at gunpoint. Jeff attempts but fails to get Kevyn to back off from Shauna. With Simone in the hospital, Taissa is left to confront her fugue alter ego. Misty meets Walter, the Citizen Detective; the two interrogate Randy Walsh about Natalie's disappearance. Lottie introduces Natalie to her support group, but her hallucinations begin to return.
14	4	"Old Wounds"	Scott Winant	Julia Bicknell & Liz Phang	April 16, 2023	0.226
When part of the team begins to favor Lottie's mysticism over Natalie's hunting skills, the two girls compete by going on separate hunts. Lottie quickly becomes hypothermic and has a vision of Laura Lee and the team. Natalie finds the white moose encased under a frozen lake; she and the team try to pull it out, but it sinks. She and Lottie tentatively make amends. Meanwhile, Van makes a map of all of the strange symbols Taissa has found and estimates where the last one could be; they instead find a disoriented Javi and bring him back to camp. In the present, Shauna, pressed by Callie, confesses the truth to her about Adam's death. Natalie bonds with Lisa, a cult member she had attacked earlier. Misty and Walter camp out at a bed and breakfast near Lottie's compound. Lottie's psychiatrist suggests she pay attention to her hallucinations. Taissa follows her fugue self's intuition and hitchhikes to a small town in Ohio, where she sees Van for the first time in years.
15	5	"Two Truths and a Lie"	Ben Semanoff	Katherine Kearns & Sarah L. Thompson	April 23, 2023	0.163
Lottie hosts meditation sessions for the team; they help Taissa with her sleepwalking, but Shauna fears she is losing Tai's support. Javi refuses to speak to the team, but tells Ben that his "friend" did not want him to return. Misty admits to Crystal that she destroyed the plane's emergency transmitter; when Crystal reacts coldly, Misty threatens her and accidentally backs her off the edge of a cliff. Shauna and Tai get caught in a snowstorm and use Lottie's meditation techniques to return to camp. Once inside, Shauna goes into labor. In the present, Callie, realizing Matt is a policeman, tells him that Shauna was sleeping with Randy. Shauna stages a tryst in a motel room, but Kevyn and Matt uncover the ruse. Taissa tells Van her sleepwalking has returned, and Van offers her support. Misty and Walter find Natalie, who rebuffs them. Walter tells Misty his theories about Adam's case; she sends him away and goes back to Lottie's compound. Lottie helps Natalie recall the last time she saw Travis.
16	6	"Qui"	Liz Garbus	Karen Joseph Adcock & Ameni Rozsa	May 7, 2023	0.158
The Yellowjackets volunteer Misty to deliver Shauna's baby. Travis and Lottie create an altar and place offerings upon it. Shauna blacks out and gives birth to a baby boy. She has trouble breastfeeding due to her own starvation, but ultimately succeeds. Later that night, she hears chanting from downstairs and finds the team eating her baby. She then comes to, revealing that she had dreamed the previous events and her baby did not survive. Shauna holds her stillborn and grieves, insisting that she can still hear him crying. In the present, Taissa notices Van's past due notices in the trashcan, but Van brushes it off. Misty calls Tai from Lottie's compound. Natalie and Lisa talk about forgiveness. Shauna and Callie are called to the police station for questioning; Shauna admits to her affair with Adam, while Callie falsely claims that Matt took her virginity. Jeff pushes Shauna to follow Tai and Van to Lottie. Shauna, Taissa, Van, Natalie, Misty, and Lottie all reunite at the compound.
17	7	"Burial"	Anya Adams	Rich Monahan & Liz Phang	May 14, 2023	0.165
Shauna buries her stillborn child and grieves for him and Jackie. The team sets out on a half-hearted mission to find Crystal, unaware of what happened to her earlier. Van admits to Taissa her doubts about survival. Misty goes to the spot where Crystal died, only to find that her body is now missing. She then talks Ben out of committing suicide. After Shauna punches Misty and accuses everyone of eating her baby, Lottie encourages Shauna to let out her pain on her; Shauna beats Lottie unconscious while the team looks on in shock. In the present, everyone is assigned a form of therapy at Lottie's compound. Misty uses an isolation tank and talks to a human version of her bird Caligula; she later calls Walter and confirms his theories about Adam's disappearance. Taissa and Van share a kiss, but Van reveals that she has terminal cancer, and will be dead within months. Lottie realizes her psychiatrist is merely another hallucination. The women discuss what they might have repressed from their time in the wilderness and dance around a campfire. Jeff calls Shauna and reveals that the authorities have found Adam's body.
18	8	"It Chooses"	Daisy von Scherler Mayer	Sarah L. Thompson & Liz Phang	May 21, 2023	0.143
The Yellowjackets struggle with hallucinations and paranoia. Coach Ben discovers Javi survived by living in a cave hidden underneath a tree. Lottie, grievously injured from Shauna's attack, tells the team not to waste her body if she is to die. Taissa suggests they must find another way to survive, which culminates in the survivors drawing cards to determine who will be killed. Natalie draws the Queen of Hearts, but before Shauna can sacrifice her, Travis pushes Shauna out of the way; Natalie escapes the cabin and is chased through the woods. Javi, trying to help her, falls through the frozen lake; the Yellowjackets let him drown, leaving Natalie spared. In the present, the police obtain a search warrant for the Sadeckis' house, and Kevyn and Matt question Jeff. Later, Jeff reveals the truth about Shauna's stillborn child to Callie. Walter emails the police, telling them he has information about Adam's disappearance, before leaving for Lottie's compound. In Lottie's "Sharing Shack," Shauna admits that Jeff was the blackmailer instead of Adam, Taissa reveals she hired Jessica Roberts to investigate the survivors, and Misty reveals the truth of the reporter's death. Lottie insists the wilderness is demanding a sacrifice and presents a choice of six cups, one containing phenobarbital, to the women.
19	9	"Storytelling"	Karyn Kusama	Ameni Rozsa	May 28, 2023	0.134
The girls return Javi's body to the cabin, where they dismember and begin to cook him. Lottie is alarmed by the team's decision to hunt each other, but Misty tells the team that Lottie approves. Coach Ben informs Natalie of Javi's hiding spot, but she tells him that he no longer belongs among them as he is a good person. Lottie tells the group that the wilderness no longer needs her as their leader because they can all communicate with it now and declares Natalie to be the new leader. While the Yellowjackets are sleeping, the cabin is lit on fire, forcing them to evacuate and leaving them stranded with no shelter. In the present, the women agree to proceed with Lottie's ritual but secretly plan to botch the ritual and have Lottie committed. Walter lethally poisons Kevyn at the compound and works with Jeff to frame him for a conspiracy, ending the investigation surrounding Adam Martin. Shauna draws the Queen of Hearts during the ritual and is chased by the others. Callie shoots Lottie in the shoulder to protect her mother, and Taissa and Van reveal that they called off the crisis team they contacted for Lottie. When Lisa arrives with a gun, Misty charges towards her with a fentanyl injection, but Natalie jumps in the way and takes the injection, dying in Misty's arms. Lottie is taken away by EMTs, but tells the women that the wilderness is pleased with their sacrifice and will reward them.

== Production ==
=== Development ===
On December 16, 2021, Yellowjackets was renewed for a second season. In January 2022, showrunners Ashley Lyle and Bart Nickerson confirmed that the adult version of Lottie would appear in season two. They also confirmed that season two would show the girls' descent into cannibalism, which had been long-teased since the series premiere. Gary Levine, Showtime's President of Entertainment, expressed hopes that season two would premiere sometime in late 2022, with an annual cycle of one season per year. In May 2022, the writers were reported to be in the initial stage of writing new scripts. On December 7, 2022, it was announced the second season would premiere on March 24, 2023, on streaming and on demand for subscribers, with March 26, 2023, as the linear TV premiere date.

=== Casting ===
In August 2022, Lauren Ambrose and Simone Kessell joined the cast to play the adult versions of Van and Lottie; Liv Hewson and Courtney Eaton, who respectively play the teen versions of the characters, were also upped from recurring to series regulars. Elijah Wood and Nuha Jes Izman were also added to the cast in season-long recurring guest roles, while Kevin Alves was promoted to series regular. Wood plays Walter, a "new citizen detective who is not represented by a younger self on the show". In December 2022, Jason Ritter, the husband of Melanie Lynskey, was reported to be cast in a guest starring role for the season. Ritter's scenes were set to be featured in a "bonus episode" that the showrunners said would be forthcoming. In November 2026, ahead of the premiere of the show's fourth and final season, Nickerson confirmed that the episode will not air and stated that "the final version of the show is what it was supposed to be".

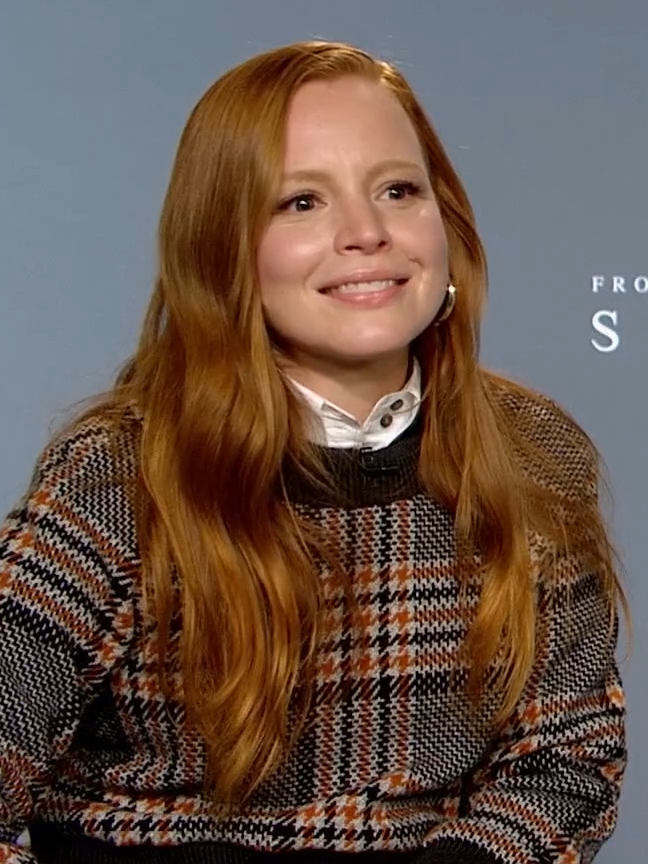
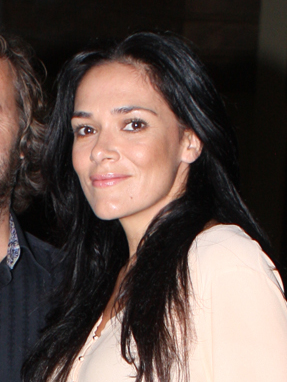
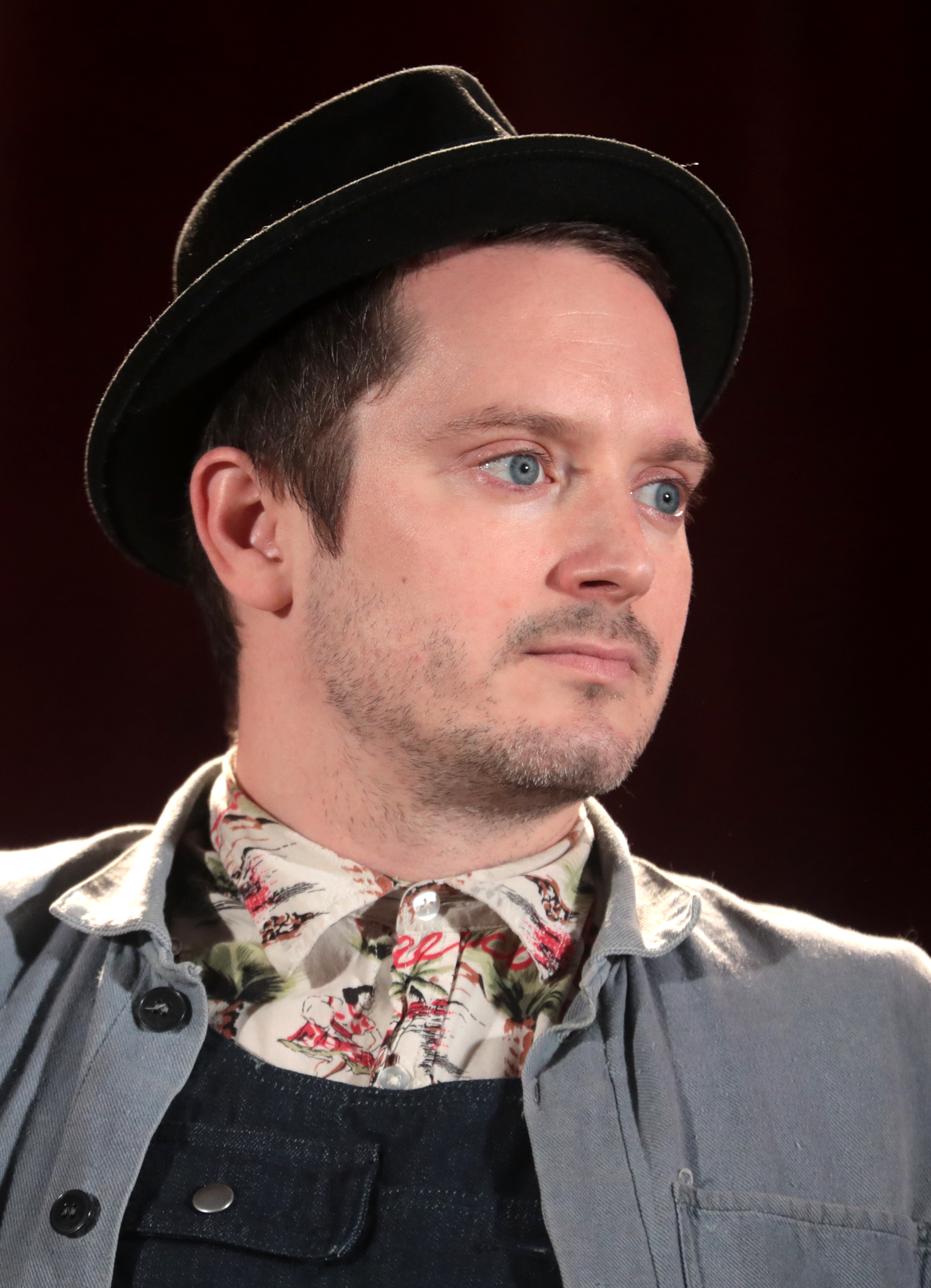
Lauren Ambrose, Simone Kessell, and Elijah Wood joined the cast.

In January 2023, Variety reported that Keeya King, who played teen Akilah in season one, had exited the series. Her role was recast with Nia Sondaya. Nicole Maines was cast as Lisa, an associate of adult Lottie attempting to recover from past trauma. Additionally, François Arnaud guest-stars in four episodes portraying Paul, the "secret boyfriend of Coach Scott (Steven Kreuger) who reminds Coach Scott of what might have been".

This season marked the last for Juliette Lewis. Though viewers expressed shock at her character's exit, the showrunners and executive producer Karyn Kusama maintained that the death of adult Natalie had been telegraphed since the pilot.

=== Filming ===
Filming for the second season began in August 2022 in Vancouver, Canada, with the first episode directed by Daisy von Scherler Mayer. The cabin scenes were filmed on a soundstage at The Bridge Studios. As filming started during the late summer, the production team used fake snow to recreate a winter landscape. In early February 2023, the cast of the 1990s timeline of the series completed filming their scenes.

== Release ==
Season two premiered on Showtime's linear network on March 26, 2023. To incentivize streaming subscriptions, the premiere and subsequent new episodes were made available for viewers on the standalone Showtime streaming app two days prior to the cable TV airing. Critics noted this potentially diluted the impact of the series' plot twists and mysteries. The standalone Showtime app was itself absorbed into Paramount+ after the conclusion of season two, which critics said may have impacted new viewers' attempts to find the show.

On March 9, 2023, Florence and the Machine recorded a cover version of No Doubt's "Just a Girl" that appears in the trailer and soundtrack for the second season. The fourth, seventh and ninth episodes of season two featured a cover of the show's theme song by Alanis Morissette, which was released as a single on April 14, 2023.

=== Home media ===
The second season of Yellowjackets was released on DVD and Blu-ray on October 10, 2023. It includes the bonus features "Behind the Buzz, Creating Yellowjackets" and the music video for Alanis Morissette's cover of the theme song "No Return."

== Reception ==
=== Audience viewership ===
The season premiere was watched by nearly 2 million viewers across Showtime's platforms, according to figures from Nielsen, comScore, and Showtime's internal streaming data. The finale episode drew in 1.5 million total viewers, showing a 7% increase in cross-platform viewership from the season one finale.

=== Critical response ===
On the review aggregator website Rotten Tomatoes, the season holds an approval rating of 94% based on 171 reviews. The website's critical consensus reads, "Having already made a startling first impression, Yellowjackets coils itself in a second season preparing for the long haul -- thankfully, its superb performances and mesmeric ambience are fine substitutes for fast answers." Metacritic, which uses a weighted average, assigned the season a score of 77 out of 100 based on 30 reviews, indicating "generally favorable" reviews.

Yellowjackets continued to receive praise for its ensemble cast, black humor, and focus on the darker sides of women. In a positive review, Richard Roeper of the Chicago Sun-Times wrote, "Alternately eerie, mystical, weird, jolting, darkly funny and just plain terrifying, 'Yellowjackets' has solidified its standing as one of the most memorable series of the decade." Roxana Hadadi of Vulture wrote, "Yellowjackets sometimes attempts so much that it trips over itself, like a fumbled fast-break play on the soccer field. But between its confident willingness to get weird — sinister trees, bloody bees, pernicious facsimiles! — and its relatively sure grip on its world-building, Yellowjackets is making a compelling case for its own longevity." USA Today's Kelly Lawler lauded the second episode in particular, where "the young ensemble cast works seamlessly in one of the most intense, affecting and all-consuming scenes I've ever watched on TV."

In a more critical review, Candice Frederick of HuffPost said that the new season becomes overwhelmed with too many characters and subplots, to the detriment of characters like adult Natalie and Taissa. She opined "maybe juggling two different chronologies puts a strain on the narrative from which the writers never fully recover". Hadadi noted "the series undercuts the impact of adult Lottie (Simone Kessell) by immediately working her into the narrative and maneuvering others around her, instead of more gracefully engineering anticipation for her debut." Ben Rosenstock, also of Vulture, criticized the characterization of Lottie as mostly serving a narrative function, instead of fully fleshing out her character like the others.

Of Ricci, Ben Travers of IndieWire wrote that she "continues to have a ball as the eccentric investigator", and that she "easily [has] the most enjoyable arc of the season". In Entertainment Weekly, Kristen Baldwin wrote, "Lynskey conveys her character's ongoing inner battle with an impeccable blend of grief and rage, though it's also nice to see her have more sweet, silly moments with Warren Kole (as Shauna's husband, Jeff). Ambrose is another one of Yellowjackets' strokes of parallel casting genius; she matches Hewson's dry wit and tough mien, and brings a subtle melancholy to adult Van." However, Travers wrote that the series has "a hesitancy — toward character development, definitive actions, and forward momentum — that simply wasn't there before, and one has to wonder if that's necessary to build out future seasons, or if it's simply the result of a successful series biding its time".

Another criticism was towards the separation of the core adult characters into different plot lines. In Vanity Fair, Richard Lawson wrote, "The trouble is that the gang is atomized, off on their own misadventures until they are finally reunited midway through the season…it's far less engaging seeing the crew drift apart than it was to see them warily coming together in season one. The performances remain sharp and just the right amount of peculiar (Lewis is the particular highlight), but even the best of actors can't make wheel spinning terribly interesting after a certain point." Many commented that the 1990s timeline emerges as the more gripping timeline of the two because of its higher stakes and contained format.

Critics also wrote of the series' habit of expanding mysteries but delaying answers, as well as its reliance on the supernatural. The Independent's Nick Hilton wrote, "The highest compliment I can pay Yellowjackets is that it's always been fun. Preposterous, but fun. Gruesome, but fun. Tantalising, but fun. Yet there comes a point where the show must produce a pay-off. It is the trap that series like Lost, another plane crash drama, fell into: teasing the audience with juicy morsels of an overarching mystery, but failing to deliver an orderly final menu." Rosenstock echoed this by saying, "Yellowjackets is most satiating when it's specific and emotionally charged, but when it lingers too long in abstraction, it leaves us hungry."

=== Accolades ===
At the 75th Primetime Emmy Awards, Yellowjackets received two nominations: Outstanding Drama Series and Outstanding Lead Actress In A Drama Series for Melanie Lynskey. At the 81st Golden Globe Awards, Christina Ricci was nominated for Best Supporting Actress in a Series. Ricci was also nominated for Best Supporting Actress in a Drama Series at the 29th Critics' Choice Awards. Ricci won for Best Supporting Actress in a Series at the 28th Satellite Awards. At the 35th GLAAD Media Awards, Yellowjackets won for Outstanding Drama Series.
