= Digestif (Yellowjackets) =

- Yellowjackets episode
- Episode no.: Season 2 Episode 3
- Directed by: Jeffrey W. Byrd
- Written by: Sarah L. Thompson; Ameni Rozsa
- Cinematography by: Corey Robson
- Editing by: Kindra Marra
- Original air date: April 9, 2023
- Running time: 57 minutes

Guest appearances
- Nicole Maines as Lisa; Nia Sondaya as Akilah; Alex Wyndham as Kevyn Tan; François Arnaud as Paul; Sarah Desjardins as Callie Sadecki; Alexa Barajas as Mari; Nuha Jes Izman as Crystal; Rukiya Bernard as Simone Abara; Elijah Wood as Walter Tattersall

Episode chronology
← Previous "Edible Complex"	Next → "Old Wounds"

"Digestif" is the third episode of the second season of the American thriller drama television series Yellowjackets. It is the thirteenth overall episode of the series and was written by executive producers Sarah L. Thompson and Ameni Rozsa, and directed by co-executive producer Jeffrey W. Byrd. It aired on Showtime on April 9, 2023, but it was available to stream two days earlier on Paramount+ with Showtime.

The series follows a New Jersey high school girls' soccer team that travels to Seattle for a national tournament in 1996. While flying over Canada, their plane crashes deep in the wilderness, and the surviving team members are left stranded for nineteen months. The series chronicles their attempts to stay alive as some of the team members are driven to cannibalism. It also focuses on the lives of the survivors 25 years later in 2021, as the events of their ordeal continue to affect them many years after their rescue. In the episode, Misty meets the Citizen Detective in her search for Natalie, while Shauna confronts a hijacker. Flashbacks depict the aftermath of the feast, as the group prepares a baby shower for Shauna.

According to Nielsen Media Research, the episode was seen by an estimated 0.210 million household viewers and gained a 0.04 ratings share among adults aged 18–49. The episode received generally positive reviews from critics, who praised the performances and intrigue, although some criticized the pacing.

== Plot ==
=== Flashbacks ===
In the aftermath of the feast, Taissa (Jasmin Savoy Brown) is shocked to find that the girls ate Jackie's corpse, and is further horrified when Van (Liv Hewson) tells her she took part in it despite claiming that she cannot remember it. Ben (Steven Krueger) is shaken from the events, but is unable to leave. For the sake of everyone, Natalie (Sophie Thatcher) takes Jackie's corpse and disposes of it in the crash site. There, she runs into a white moose and shoots at it, but the moose escapes.

To alleviate tensions, the group hosts a baby shower for Shauna (Sophie Nélisse). During this, Misty (Sammi Hanratty) and Crystal (Nuha Jes Izman) grow closer. When Taissa sleepwalks again, Van decides to accompany her. Taissa explains that "she" is instructing her to follow "The One With No Eyes", but claims to not know anything when she wakes up. During the baby shower, birds begin to fall from the sky when Shauna's nose bleeds on the symbol stitched into her blanket. Lottie suggests they are blessings from the woods.

In scenes before the plane crash, Ben is in a relationship with a man named Paul (François Arnaud). While they are content, Paul is frustrated that Ben still has not moved in with him as promised. Ben defends his decision, as he wants to prioritize the Yellowjackets team as he feels they might go to the finals. Later, Ben announces that he quit the team, accepting that his relationship with Paul is more important. As they embrace, a news report of the plane crash is seen, revealing that this is just a hallucination.

=== Present day ===
At a café, Jeff (Warren Kole) questions Shauna (Melanie Lynskey) over her affair, believing she finds him boring. Instead of returning home, Jeff decides to take them to Colonial Williamsburg instead. On the way, they appear to hit a man, and as they try to help him, the man pulls out a gun, demanding the car keys. Shauna surprisingly attacks the man and takes his gun; while Jeff tries to get her to hand over the gun, the hijacker escapes in their car.

After the car crash, Taissa (Tawny Cypress) recovers from her wounds, while hallucinating over Simone (Rukiya Bernard), who is in a coma. As she tries to reorganize herself, she sees that her reflection in the mirror is different to her. At the commune, Lottie (Simone Kessell) tries to convince Natalie (Juliette Lewis) to participate in some activities with the members, which she flatly refuses. At the docks, Misty (Christina Ricci) meets the Citizen Detective, Walter Tattersall (Elijah Wood). Misty wants to interrogate their suspect, but is forced to hide when it is revealed to be Randy. Using an earphone, she talks with Randy through Walter, using violent threats to find Natalie's location. Randy claims he does not know, but states he saw a group in a van near the motel. Deducing that the group used a credit card to buy a soda, Walter traces the card to New York and suggests Misty accompany him.

At the gym, Jeff runs into Kevyn (Alex Wyndham) and confronts him for questioning Shauna. Kevyn in turn reveals that someone gave them a tip that Shauna was having an affair with Adam, which Jeff disputes. Using a tracking device, Shauna locates the car to a shop and threatens the hijacker at gunpoint to give her the car back. Back at the commune, Natalie participates in an exercise with Lottie, asking her to come to terms with the rest of the group and herself. However, Lottie is shocked to learn that a sacred beehive in the commune has been covered in blood and all bees died. As Lottie hears a voice, she discovers that this was a hallucination.

== Development ==
=== Production ===
The episode was written by executive producers Sarah L. Thompson and Ameni Rozsa, and directed by co-executive producer Jeffrey W. Byrd. This marked Thompson's third writing credit, Rozsa's third writing credit, and Byrd's first directing credit.

== Reception ==
=== Viewers ===
The episode was watched by 0.210 million viewers, earning a 0.04 in the 18-49 rating demographics on the Nielsen ratings scale. This means that 0.04 percent of all households with televisions watched the episode.

=== Critical reviews ===
"Digestif" received generally positive reviews from critics. The review aggregator website Rotten Tomatoes reported a 100% approval rating for the episode, with an average rating of 7.5/10 and based on 10 reviews.

Hattie Lindert of The A.V. Club gave the episode a "B" and wrote, "If episode three accomplishes one thing, it's bringing the cliff the girls are trudging towards — in Taissa's case, literally — into sharper view. The man who was once their leader is starving and terrified of them; Shauna's due date is imminent; and Lottie's blood magic is proving more frighteningly effective than Natalie specifically is ready to admit."

Erin Qualey of Vulture gave the episode a 4 star rating out of 5 and wrote, "Yellowjackets follows up the game-changing events of “Edible Complex” with “Digestif,” an episode that delivers Lost-like flashbacks, bloody hallucinations, a twisted baby shower, and not one but three fantastic monologues. The hour is chock full of moving pieces, serving to properly introduce new characters, establish Lottie's tightening hold on the gang in the wilderness, and document the fraying edges of Ben's sanity."

Proma Khosla of IndieWire gave the episode a "B–" and wrote, "Yellowjackets continues to underscore that its tormented characters were their truest selves during the most harrowing, unfortunate time in their lives — and that they will never know peace after leaving it behind." Bernard Boo of Den of Geek gave the episode a 4.5 star rating out of 5 and wrote, "“Digestif” is an apt title for an episode that gives us a respite from the gruesome acts on display in “Edible Complex.” There's a lot of intrigue here, and a lot of setup for what’s to come later in the season."

Erik Kain of Forbes wrote, "All told, another powerful, thought-provoking, disturbing episode of Yellowjackets. It may not be quite as dark or troubling as the previous episode — hard to top that feast in the woods — but it serves as the perfect digestif to wash it all down with." Coleman Spilde of The Daily Beast wrote, "What “it” is, and why it's so bloodthirsty is the question that still remains. But that probably won't take too long to reveal if the descent keeps going at this pace. Reality is merely a suggestion for most of the Yellowjackets now. Let's just keep that baby blanket away from Shauna's poor, dry nose."

Esther Zuckerman of The New York Times wrote, "Wood has such an easy, cheery demeanor that you almost think he meant to say Watson, Sherlock's partner. But no, he invokes Moriarty, Sherlock's greatest foe. What is his game plan here? Or is “Moriarty” actually the perfect reference for the kind of person who performs a monologue about a dead daughter at a baby shower?" Brittney Bender of Bleeding Cool gave the episode a perfect 10 out of 10 rating and wrote, "Showtime's Yellowjackets S02E03 "Digestif" is another example of the series stepping up to the challenge presented in a second season. The emotional roller coaster, heartbreaking exploration of Ben's character, and haunting visions from the wilderness all prove how phenomenal these stories can become. I'm cautious about future episodes, but for now, this one continues the winning streak this series' season is on in my book."
