= Friends, Romans, Countrymen (Yellowjackets) =

- Yellowjackets episode
- Episode no.: Season 2 Episode 1
- Directed by: Daisy von Scherler Mayer
- Written by: Ashley Lyle; Bart Nickerson
- Cinematography by: Shasta Spahn
- Editing by: Kevin D. Ross
- Original air date: March 26, 2023
- Running time: 59 minutes

Guest appearances
- Ella Purnell as Jackie Taylor; Nicole Maines as Lisa; Nia Sondaya as Akilah; Sarah Desjardins as Callie Sadecki; Alexa Barajas as Mari; Nuha Jes Izman as Crystal; Rukiya Bernard as Simone Abara; Elijah Wood as Walter Tattersall

Episode chronology
← Previous "Sic Transit Gloria Mundi"	Next → "Edible Complex"

"Friends, Romans, Countrymen" is the first episode of the second season of the American thriller drama television series Yellowjackets. It is the eleventh overall episode of the series and was written by series creators Ashley Lyle and Bart Nickerson, and directed by Daisy von Scherler Mayer. It aired on Showtime on March 26, 2023, but it was available to stream two days earlier on Paramount+ with Showtime.

The series follows a New Jersey high school girls' soccer team that travels to Seattle for a national tournament in 1996. While flying over Canada, their plane crashes deep in the wilderness, and the surviving team members are left stranded for nineteen months. The series chronicles their attempts to stay alive as some of the team members are driven to cannibalism. It also focuses on the lives of the survivors 25 years later in 2021, as the events of their ordeal continue to affect them many years after their rescue. In the episode, Shauna and Jeff decide to destroy any evidence linking them to Adam, while Misty searches for Natalie. Flashbacks depict the group's struggle when winter arrives, with food resources almost running out.

According to Nielsen Media Research, the episode was seen by an estimated 0.226 million household viewers and gained a 0.03 ratings share among adults aged 18–49. The episode received mostly positive reviews from critics, who considered it a promising start for the season.

== Plot ==
=== Flashbacks ===
Two months have passed since Jackie's death, and winter has arrived in the wilderlands. Shauna (Sophie Nélisse) has taken Jackie's corpse (Ella Purnell) to a shack, where she often imagines having conversations with her. When they talk over her affair with Jeff, Shauna tries to revive Jackie, accidentally ripping off her ear, which Shauna hides in her pocket. Misty (Sammi Hanratty), still ostracized after the mushroom incident, bonds with Crystal (Nuha Jes Izman), a member of the JV girls team, and she agrees to give Misty singing lessons.

Natalie (Sophie Thatcher) and Travis (Kevin Alves) have been leaving the cabin every day to find food or traces of Javi, but they have not found anything. Natalie confides in Ben (Steven Krueger) that as two months have passed, Javi is probably dead, but she cannot bring herself to tell Travis. Travis eventually realizes this and begins having a panic attack. When Lottie (Courtney Eaton) comforts him, she experiences a vision, telling him that Javi is still alive.

Van (Liv Hewson) ties her wrist to Taissa (Jasmin Savoy Brown) at night to prevent her from sleepwalking. Despite Taissa suddenly biting her in her sleep, Van states she will not leave her. While searching the following day, Natalie and Travis come across a clearing, which fits the vision that Lottie gave them. With limited food resources, Shauna takes out Jackie's ear and eats it.

In 1998, some of the group have been rescued and board a plane, refusing to talk to the press. While boarding the plane, Lottie suddenly turns to the crowd and screams. Lottie's parents take her to therapy, as she has not talked since her arrival, and they are frustrated with her lack of response. The therapist convinces them to get Lottie an electroshock therapy in a mental institution. She shares a room with another girl, calming her by claiming "they" will help her in the way they helped Lottie.

=== Present day ===
Lottie (Simone Kessell) is seen running a wellness commune, where she tells her crowd that they are the only ones who can help themselves.

Misty (Christina Ricci) is helping Shauna (Melanie Lynskey) in covering her tracks from Adam's murder. While they maintain everything is in order, Misty is disturbed when she finds a Reddit thread, where a person claims to have access to Adam's credit cards and believes a woman might be involved. Based on advice by Misty, Shauna and Jeff (Warren Kole) visit Adam's studio, where they find that Adam had portraits of Shauna. They destroy the portraits and later take his ID and evidence to their house, where they burn it in a grill. However, Callie (Sarah Desjardins) becomes suspicious and checks the grill, finding Adam's photo.

Taissa (Tawny Cypress) buys a new dog for Sammy, but Simone (Rukiya Bernard) stops her. She has found the altar at the basement, even though Taissa does not know what she is talking about. Simone orders her to get help, or she will expose her to the press. Taissa goes to the basement and is horrified to discover the altar, realizing she did it while sleepwalking. Misty visits Natalie's motel, finding evidence that she was forced out of her room. Natalie is seen handcuffed to a bed on an unknown location, although she quickly deduces where she might be. She stabs her captor and escapes, revealing that she is in Lottie's commune. She finds Lottie conducting a ritual in which they are burying a man alive. She calls Lottie out for her actions, but Lottie states that she has a message for her from Travis.

== Development ==
=== Production ===
The episode was written by series creators Ashley Lyle and Bart Nickerson, and directed by Daisy von Scherler Mayer. This marked Lyle's fourth writing credit, Nickerson's fourth writing credit, and von Scherler Mayer's directing credit.

== Reception ==
=== Viewers ===
The episode was watched by 0.226 million viewers, earning a 0.03 in the 18-49 rating demographics on the Nielsen ratings scale. This means that 0.03 percent of all households with televisions watched the episode. This was a 33% decrease in viewership from the previous episode, which was watched by 0.333 million viewers, earning a 0.10 in the 18-49 rating demographics.

=== Critical reviews ===
"Friends, Romans, Countrymen" received mostly positive reviews from critics. The review aggregator website Rotten Tomatoes reported a 93% approval rating for the episode, with an average rating of 8.6/10 and based on 15 reviews. The site's consensus reads: "While Yellowjackets is still picking up the pieces of its first finale's cliffhangers, more focus on the mysterious Lottie and grisly hints at the barbarism to come give this premiere an immediate pulse."

Hattie Lindert of The A.V. Club gave the episode an "A–" and wrote, "Yellowjackets doesn't miss a step in planting the audience right back in that claustrophobic yet all-too-expansive world. Just like the teammates at its center, Yellowjackets is already demonstrating that this is a story built to survive — and in its own fucked-up, traumatized, woo-woo way, thrive."

Erin Qualey of Vulture gave the episode a 4 star rating out of 5 and wrote, "Well, friends, we have our first official act of cannibalism. The second season of Yellowjackets wastes no time in getting to one of the core questions that loomed large over the first ten episodes: When will these girls start eating one another? We now have the answer, but it's complicated." Proma Khosla of IndieWire gave the episode a "B–" and wrote, "Enough time passes between scenes that a viewer could even forget there's a human ear in Shauna's pocket, until she takes it out to stare at while pacing. We all know what's coming — and so does she."

Bernard Boo of Den of Geek gave the episode a 4.5 star rating out of 5 and wrote, "Yellowjackets looks to be in top form as it kicks off its second season, with the main plot lines maturing in fascinating ways." Erik Kain of Forbes wrote, "awkward and jarring introduction of new teen survivors to the crash timeline aside, this was overall a really good episode that pushes us further down the path of darkness and despair and mystery and friendship and betrayal and teenage madness and middle-age sadness that makes Yellowjackets so damn special."

Esquire wrote, "Is this the story of a bunch of kids who drive themselves a little crazy in their formative years and suffer the psychological repercussions long into adulthood? Or is there something else — something more metaphysical — that these girls have stumbled into? With Friday's Season Two premiere of Yellowjackets, titled "Friends, Romans, Countrymen," hopefully we're closer to an answer." Cade Taylor of Telltale TV gave the episode a 4 star rating out of 5 and wrote, "“Friends, Romans, Countrymen” may only be the premiere outing of the second season, but it's enough to foreshadow impending Oscar-worthy performances from the cast. I can't wait to see the depths this season will explore."

Esther Zuckerman of The New York Times wrote, "Yellowjackets loves to remind us that there's a transactional nature to its female solidarity — it's about survival more than support. I think about that final image of Shauna putting Jackie's ear into her mouth." Brittney Bender of Bleeding Cool gave the episode a perfect 10 out of 10 rating and wrote, "Showtime's Yellowjackets S02E01 "Friends, Romans, Countrymen" brought us back to the wilderness and gave a first-class examination of grief, survival, and the impact of trauma later in life. Meanwhile, we were also provided with some perfectly timed absurdity that disturbed and enthralled us."
