= Edible Complex =

- Yellowjackets episode
- Episode no.: Season 2 Episode 2
- Directed by: Ben Semanoff
- Written by: Jonathan Lisco
- Cinematography by: Francois Dagenais
- Editing by: Jeff Israel
- Original air date: April 2, 2023
- Running time: 60 minutes

Guest appearances
- Ella Purnell as Jackie Taylor; Jane Widdop as Laura Lee; Nicole Maines as Lisa; Nia Sondaya as Akilah; Alex Wyndham as Kevyn Tan; John Reynolds as Matt Saracusa; Sarah Desjardins as Callie Sadecki; Alexa Barajas as Mari; Rukiya Bernard as Simone Abara; Nuha Jes Izman as Crystal; Andres Soto as Adult Travis Martinez; Elijah Wood as Walter Tattersall

Episode chronology
← Previous "Friends, Romans, Countrymen"	Next → "Digestif"

"Edible Complex" is the second episode of the second season of the American thriller drama television series Yellowjackets. It is the twelfth overall episode of the series and was written by executive producer Jonathan Lisco, and directed by Ben Semanoff. It aired on Showtime on April 2, 2023, but it was available to stream two days earlier on Paramount+ with Showtime.

The series follows a New Jersey high school girls' soccer team that travels to Seattle for a national tournament in 1996. While flying over Canada, their plane crashes deep in the wilderness, and the surviving team members are left stranded for nineteen months. The series chronicles their attempts to stay alive as some of the team members are driven to cannibalism. It also focuses on the lives of the survivors 25 years later in 2021, as the events of their ordeal continue to affect them many years after their rescue. In the episode, Shauna finds that she is investigated for Adam's disappearance, while Lottie tells Natalie about her meeting with Travis. Flashbacks depict the group running out of food, while Shauna's hallucinations with Jackie's corpse intensify.

The episode received critical acclaim, with critics praising the final scene as the episode's highlight.

== Plot ==
=== 1996 ===
Shauna (Sophie Nélisse) is still haunted by Jackie's corpse (Ella Purnell), mocking her and reminding her that her food supplies are running out. Jackie knows she took her ear, and suggests moving her hair to hide it from the girls. Per Jackie's wishes, Shauna dresses it up with make-up. The group gets worried about Shauna's actions, believing she is losing her mind.

While sleepwalking, Taissa (Jasmin Savoy Brown) releases herself and almost falls off a cliff, only to be stopped by Van (Liv Hewson). The following day, Taissa discovers the corpse, disturbing her. She exposes Shauna's actions to Lottie (Courtney Eaton), telling her that they need to burn the body so Shauna can move on. Natalie (Sophie Thatcher) fakes Javi's death to Travis (Kevin Alves) by smearing a pair of his shorts with her own blood, believing that they have to accept his death and stop wasting time.

The group forms a pyre for Jackie; after resisting, Shauna accepts that this is necessary and burns the pyre. When Travis and Natalie arrive, he throws the shorts in the pyre. That night, the group awakens to find that the snow slowed the flame, cooking Jackie's corpse. As Shauna approaches it, she concludes that Jackie "wants us to." Reaching their breaking point, they start eating her, juxtaposed to a fantasy where they consume a feast in a ceremony. Ben (Steven Krueger) retreats to the cabin, horrified.

=== 2021 ===
At the commune, Lottie (Simone Kessell) tells Natalie (Juliette Lewis) that she has been following her after Travis' death, as she feared she would get in trouble, which is why her followers kidnapped her before she could commit suicide. She also reveals that Travis called her on the day he died, claiming that the wilderness was haunting him. She visited him and told him that getting close to death would alleviate the situation, and he in turn asked her to not get Natalie involved. He left and gave her instructions in emptying his bank account, also getting her to help hang himself temporarily to confront the darkness, but a malfunction caused his death. Natalie is unsure if this is true.

Kevyn (Alex Wyndham) visits Shauna (Melanie Lynskey), questioning her about her relationship with Adam as the investigation intensifies. Callie (Sarah Desjardins) surprisingly covers for Shauna, and Kevyn leaves without suspicion. At a bar, Callie sees a man, Jay (John Reynolds), looking at her and flirts with him, exposing Shauna's affair. Later, Jay is seen with Kevyn, revealing that he is working with him and that his real name is Matt. Matt reveals Shauna's affair, but Kevyn needs more evidence before proceeding.

While trying to locate Natalie, Misty (Christina Ricci) is contacted by the anonymous Citizen Detective, offering to help her hack the security cameras. She finds a note with a hidden message, where he invites her to confront a motel guest. Taissa (Tawny Cypress) submits herself to many treatments in order to stop her sleepwalking. She is surprised when Sammy shows up at her apartment, and calls Simone (Rukiya Bernard) to pick him up. When she arrives, they realize Sammy has disappeared. Driving around, they are called by Sammy's school, and discover that Sammy is still in school and never left. As they argue, they crash into a truck.

== Development ==
=== Production ===
The episode was written by executive producer Jonathan Lisco, and directed by Ben Semanoff. This marked Lisco's second writing credit, and Semanoff's first directing credit.

=== Writing ===
The episode features the young characters engaging in cannibalism, which has been heavily implied since the beginning of the series. Showrunner Ashley Lyle said it was time to finally address it, "There was a part of us that felt like there could be nothing more boring as storytellers than to have an entire season where the audience is just waiting for that to happen. So we said, "Let's do it. We're here, it feels like we're finally at a place where we can earn it." And we did not feel like we could earn it and get them from point A to point B in season one, but I think that winter gave us an opportunity to really deepen the pits of their despair and their desperation in a way that we could justify it. It allowed us to open up the rest of the season to story that could move beyond that point."

=== Filming ===
For the feast scene, the actors consumed jack fruit and rice paper that had been soaked and air-fried. Many actors considered that the scene had a bad smell, and that the scene was complicated as they had to do it next to a fake corpse. Sophie Nélisse said, "Even though we were eating fake, like, rice paper, the image was so vivid. What we were picking at seemed so real that our brains couldn't decipher and we were all gagging as soon as they called cut. It was gross." It was reported that some of the cast members threw up while filming the scene.

== Reception ==
=== Critical reviews ===
"Edible Complex" received critical acclaim. The review aggregator website Rotten Tomatoes reported a 100% approval rating for the episode, with an average rating of 8.5/10 and based on 13 reviews. The site's consensus reads: "Marking a point of no return for the Yellowjackets, "Edible Complex" manages to horrify while remaining playful enough to not completely turn over viewers' stomaches."

Hattie Lindert of The A.V. Club gave the episode an "A" and wrote, "As both of Yellowjackets' timelines apply pressure and squeeze, adolescence and adulthood begin slipping into one, and two very different ways of life start looking interchangeable. It's a surreal convergence that skillfully encapsulates one of the series' most enduring themes: trauma and how we live with it. Where is the line between empathy for your past self and refusal to inhabit the reality of what you've seen? And at what point do the coping mechanisms the girls once used to shield themselves from emotional and physical destruction turn pernicious in their protection? For as much horror as the survivors have already experienced, co-showrunner Jonathan Lisco has already advised strapping in: Cannibalism is just the tip of the iceberg."

Erin Qualey of Vulture gave the episode a 4 star rating out of 5 and wrote, "Yellowjackets has been dangling the possibility of cannibalism since day one, but there's an ocean of difference between ritual sacrifice and simple survival. Sure, we can argue that Jackie died because the others were attempting to socially murder her, but ultimately her death was a tragic accident. In an emergency, no one would fault the survivors for eating her to stay alive. So it's odd that this episode paints the consumption of her body as such a transgressive act when it's actually just a survival tactic." Proma Khosla of IndieWire gave the episode a "B" and wrote, "Significantly, the episode's final moments focus on Coach Scott. He not only forgoes the taste of Jackie but backs away from the scene in abject horror, retreating to the cabin to process or forget what he just saw. Kreuger expresses a whole range of emotions — revulsion, fear, realization — all roiling together. There's teen drama, and then there's whatever he's been dealing with since the crash, and whatever fresh hell this midnight snack may have unleashed."

Bernard Boo of Den of Geek gave the episode a 4 star rating out of 5 and wrote, "In less capable hands, the visions of horror the show presents every week would be much harder to stomach, or worse, easily dismissible as silly or unbelievable. But all of the ghastly acts are earned, with easy-to-follow character motivations and behaviors that not only make sense, but make all the drama wickedly fun to watch." Erik Kain of Forbes wrote, "Somehow Yellowjackets keeps getting darker, crazier and more — dare I say it? — delicious as we go. This is one of the best shows on TV and one of the best I've seen in years. I just hope to the dark gods of the dirt that they have this story mapped out properly and we don't have our hearts broken. Again."

Coleman Spilde of The Daily Beast wrote, "After a less-than-stellar season premiere, Yellowjackets Season 2 has blessedly started to pick up the pace in its second episode." Cade Taylor of Telltale TV gave the episode a 4 star rating out of 5 and wrote, "After spending the majority of Season One asking when we'll see the group resort to the inevitable, the writers have found a ghastly yet non-sinister way to portray the action."

Esther Zuckerman of The New York Times wrote, "I wonder how long it's going to take to find out what that 'darkness' is, and whether the teases are going to grow frustrating. At the same time, this is a nightmare-inducing episode; no matter how vague the supernatural elements remain, they are thoroughly creepy in a way that itches the bones. And, you know, the girls are eating people now." Brittney Bender of Bleeding Cool gave the episode a perfect 10 out of 10 rating and wrote, "Showtime's Yellowjackets S02E02 "Edible Complex" was a wild journey through the decay of sanity in the wilderness that resulted in one of the series' most powerful scenes yet. The episode was a bewitching exploration of the cruel beauty found in the drive for survival, both mentally and physically."

== See also ==
- Cannibalism in popular culture
