= Sic Transit Gloria Mundi (Yellowjackets) =

- Yellowjackets episode
- Episode no.: Season 1 Episode 10
- Directed by: Eduardo Sánchez
- Written by: Ashley Lyle; Bart Nickerson
- Cinematography by: C. Kim Miles
- Editing by: Jeff Israel
- Original air date: January 16, 2022
- Running time: 59 minutes

Guest appearances
- Courtney Eaton as Teen Lottie; Liv Hewson as Teen Van; Jane Widdop as Laura Lee; Keeya King as Akilah; Peter Gadiot as Adam Martin; Alex Wyndham as Kevyn Tan; Kevin Alves as Teen Travis; Alexa Barajas as Mari; Rekha Sharma as Jessica Roberts; Sarah Desjardins as Callie Sadecki; Rukiya Bernard as Simone Abara; Tonya Cornelisse as Allie Stevens

Episode chronology
← Previous "Doomcoming"	Next → "Friends, Romans, Countrymen"

"Sic Transit Gloria Mundi" is the tenth episode and first season finale of the American thriller drama television series Yellowjackets. The episode was written by series creators Ashley Lyle and Bart Nickerson, and directed by Eduardo Sánchez. It originally aired on Showtime on January 16, 2022.

The series follows a New Jersey high school girls' soccer team that travels to Seattle for a national tournament in 1996. While flying over Canada, their plane crashes deep in the wilderness, and the surviving team members are left stranded for nineteen months. The series chronicles their attempts to stay alive as some of the team members are driven to cannibalism. It also focuses on the lives of the survivors 25 years later in 2021, as the events of their ordeal continue to affect them many years after their rescue. In the episode, Shauna, Natalie, Misty and Taissa try to dispose of Adam's body, as well as attending their high school reunion. Flashbacks depict the tensions arising in the group after the Doomcoming party.

According to Nielsen Media Research, the episode was seen by an estimated 0.333 million household viewers and gained a 0.10 ratings share among adults aged 18–49. The episode received highly positive reviews from critics, who praised the performances, flashbacks and set-up for the second season. For the episode, Christina Ricci received a nomination for Outstanding Supporting Actress in a Drama Series at the 74th Primetime Emmy Awards.

== Plot ==
=== 1996 ===
In the aftermath of the "Doomcoming" party, tensions arise among the group. Travis (Kevin Alves) has been looking for Javi, who disappeared after the previous night's events, refusing to let Natalie (Sophie Thatcher) get involved. Nevertheless, Natalie still tags along.

When the girls find out they ingested hallucinogenic mushrooms, they realize Misty (Sammi Hanratty) is responsible for their state, as she intended to use the mushrooms only on Ben (Steven Krueger). Suddenly, a bear emerges, alarming the girls. Lottie (Courtney Eaton) takes a knife and shocks the group by calming the bear and then killing him with a simple stab. Later, Van (Liv Hewson) confides in Taissa (Jasmin Savoy Brown) that she believes she is having visions, but is unsure of what they might mean.

That night, Jackie (Ella Purnell) confronts the girls for their actions during the previous night. She confronts Shauna (Sophie Nélisse) for almost killing Travis, also revealing that she knows she slept with Jeff. Shauna in turn accuses Jackie of controlling her life, claiming she had no interest in soccer nor going to the same university as her. She further adds that Jackie is failing to protect her perfect image, and will peak in high school. Jackie demands Shauna leave the cabin, but when she refuses, Jackie decides to leave instead. Despite Taissa asking her to talk to her, Shauna instead goes to sleep.

Jackie is awakened by Shauna, who apologizes and takes her back to the cabin. As she drinks hot chocolate and is met with appreciation from the group, Jackie suddenly sees the spirit of Laura Lee (Jane Widdop). A dark figure is seen in the background, telling her they have been waiting for her. Shauna suddenly wakes up the next morning and is horrified to find that it started snowing, and Jackie froze to death. Somewhere, Lottie, Van and Misty take a heart to a tree, where Lottie starts speaking in French before proclaiming, "and let the darkness set us free."

=== 2021 ===
Misty (Christina Ricci) retrieves tools from her nursing home, accompanying Natalie (Juliette Lewis) to dispose of Adam's body. Misty gets Natalie, Shauna (Melanie Lynskey) and Taissa (Tawny Cypress) to destroy their SIM cards, and all work together in chopping the body. Afterwards, they dispose of the body.

Shauna, Natalie, Misty and Taissa later attend their high school reunion, where Jeff (Warren Kole) assures Randy, who knows about the blackmail, that everything is under control. Nevertheless, Shauna threatens Randy into staying silent over the situation or she will kill him. An adult Allie (Tonya Cornelisse), who avoided going on the plane, invites Shauna and Jeff to dance, to the former's chagrin. After the reunion, Misty returns home, and decides to release Jessica (Rekha Sharma). Before leaving, Misty hands her back a pack of cigarettes. As Jessica drives, she realizes that the cigarettes were poisoned and crashes her car.

Jeff and Shauna get Callie (Sarah Desjardins) to accompany them in watching TV, but they are startled when they see a missing report on Adam. While Taissa awaits the results of the Senate run, Simone (Rukiya Bernard) goes home to pick up a few things. She finds a bloody mark in the crawlspace of the basement, and descends to investigate. She is horrified to discover the severed head of her dog, Sammy's doll, and what appears to be a human heart. During this, Taissa and her team are shocked when the results reveal she won the election. At the motel, Natalie prepares to commit suicide, when she is interrupted by a group of people who kidnap her, just as her phone rings. As the group takes her in a van, the phone gets a voice message from Suzie, who reveals that the person who emptied Travis' bank account was Lottie.

== Development ==
=== Production ===
The episode was written by series creators Ashley Lyle and Bart Nickerson, and directed by Eduardo Sánchez. This marked Lyle's third writing credit, Nickerson's third writing credit, and Sánchez's first directing credit. The episode was originally titled "Live Through This".

=== Writing ===
Regarding Jackie's death, Lyle explained, "In the most straightforward way, our show is operating on that Lord of the Flies level. She was symbolic of society and the home that they had known, and the ways of thinking and behaving, and all of those structures. It felt important to us. She just didn't seem like a character who was going to make it. That said, we wanted to give her the dignity of an emotionally moving death and not just a shocking death."

On revealing Lottie was still alive, Nickerson said, "One of the stories that we're obviously telling in both the present day and the 1996 story is the emergence of this religiosity. There's something potentially supernatural, potentially based in a group psychosis that at one point took hold of this team, and we're seeing it emerge for the first time in ’96. It seemed natural to introduce the person who is the heart of that before moving onto Season Two."

== Reception ==
=== Viewers ===
The episode was watched by 0.333 million viewers, earning a 0.10 in the 18-49 rating demographics on the Nielsen ratings scale. This means that 0.10 percent of all households with televisions watched the episode. This was a 21% decrease in viewership from the previous episode, which was watched by 0.419 million viewers, earning a 0.08 in the 18-49 rating demographics.

=== Critical reviews ===
"Sic Transit Gloria Mundi" received highly positive reviews from critics. Leila Latif of The A.V. Club gave the episode a "B" and wrote, "Had this been the note that Yellowjackets had concluded on, I would have had to have led the comments section in a protest march on because it's not the great crescendo we were hoping for, but does manage to set up some exciting new propositions for season two."

Kelly McClure of Vulture gave the episode a perfect 5 star rating out of 5 and wrote, "The last 20 minutes of this finale shook me to such a degree that I haven't experienced since watching Midsommar for the first time." Cade Taylor of Telltale TV gave the episode a perfect 5 star rating out of 5 and wrote, "Yellowjackets Season 1 Episode 10, “Sic Transit Gloria Mundi,” is a meticulously crafted finale that secures its spot as one of the best new shows on television."

Ben Travers of IndieWire wrote, "Beyond the well-paced twists and turns, the excellent performances, and the audacity of its storytelling, Yellowjackets keeps us hooked because the creators clearly care about these women. Jackie's death isn't a shockfest; it's a tragedy. You're moved more than you're horrified, and these first 10 episodes are filled with moments of pure joy to match the times of utter terror. What the Yellowjackets have gone through in just one season is incredible, and they're not out of the woods yet (literally — there's so much more to cover in the past timeline)." Caroline Framke of Variety wrote, "Now that the show's a success, Yellowjackets has more eyes on it than ever. More people will work harder to find its every Easter egg, solve its every clue, and pick apart its logic. But that shouldn't encourage the series to make itself more complicated for the sake of keeping us on our toes. If anything, the Yellowjackets team should take heart in the fact that its meticulous attention to detail made its relatively simple answers all the more satisfying — and left us starving for more."

Brittney Bender of Bleeding Cool gave the episode a perfect 10 out of 10 rating and wrote, "Showtime's Yellowjackets concluded its first season on Showtime with a rollercoaster of an episode, with the series having mastered the art of compelling storytelling on television while also setting up some fascinating threads to follow through with during the second season (which officially, cannot come soon enough)." Greg Wheeler of The Review Geek gave the episode a 4 star rating out of 5 and wrote, "Sure, there are some plot contrivances here and there, along with a couple of plot holes (how on earth has Van recovered so quickly?!) but there's a lot to like here, making for a really enjoyable watch. Season 2 looks set to be absolutely crazy – and we are all for it!"

=== Accolades ===
Christina Ricci submitted the episode to support her nomination for Outstanding Supporting Actress in a Drama Series at the 74th Primetime Emmy Awards. She would lose to Julia Garner for Ozark.
