= Old Wounds (Yellowjackets) =

- Yellowjackets episode
- Episode no.: Season 2 Episode 4
- Directed by: Scott Winant
- Written by: Julia Bicknell; Liz Phang
- Cinematography by: Shasta Spahn
- Editing by: Daniel Williams
- Original air date: April 16, 2023
- Running time: 60 minutes

Guest appearances
- Jane Widdop as Laura Lee; Nicole Maines as Lisa; Nia Sondaya as Akilah; François Arnaud as Paul; Sarah Desjardins as Callie Sadecki; Alexa Barajas as Mari; Rekha Sharma as Jessica Roberts; Nuha Jes Izman as Crystal; Jenn Griffin as Sybill; Elijah Wood as Walter Tattersall

Episode chronology
← Previous "Digestif"	Next → "Two Truths and a Lie"

"Old Wounds" is the fourth episode of the second season of the American thriller drama television series Yellowjackets. It is the fourteenth overall episode of the series and was written by co-executive producers Julia Bicknell and Liz Phang, and directed by Scott Winant. It aired on Showtime on April 16, 2023, but it was available to stream two days earlier on Paramount+ with Showtime.

The series follows a New Jersey high school girls' soccer team that travels to Seattle for a national tournament in 1996. While flying over Canada, their plane crashes deep in the wilderness, and the surviving team members are left stranded for nineteen months. The series chronicles their attempts to stay alive as some of the team members are driven to cannibalism. It also focuses on the lives of the survivors 25 years later in 2021, as the events of their ordeal continue to affect them many years after their rescue. In the episode, Shauna decides to come clean to Callie, while Taissa takes a trip. Flashbacks depict tensions arising between Lottie and Natalie, as they decide to determine who should be the lead hunter.

According to Nielsen Media Research, the episode was seen by an estimated 0.226 million household viewers and gained a 0.03 ratings share among adults aged 18–49. The episode received positive reviews from critics, who praised the ending and revelations, although some criticized the pacing.

== Plot ==
=== Flashbacks ===
Tensions arise between Lottie (Courtney Eaton) and Natalie (Sophie Thatcher), as some girls believe Lottie's mysticism is responsible for their recent food findings. Natalie declares that she and Lottie will have a competition, where each one will leave the cabin and see who can find the most food, even though some are worried for Lottie as she is not a hunter.

Lottie quickly becomes hypothermic, stumbling upon the former site of the Cessna plane. She suddenly imagines herself wandering into a mall, where she encounters the girls waiting for her to eat, with Laura Lee (Jane Widdop) included. Despite wanting to stay with Laura Lee, Lottie is forced to wake up, as her condition is worsening. Meanwhile, Natalie finds the white moose underneath a frozen lake and asks the group for help. Despite having agreed to not get involved, they decide to help as their food supply is running low. They try to pull the moose out with ropes, but the weight is too much for them and the moose falls into the lake.

They take Natalie back to the cabin, while Mari (Alexa Barajas) and Akilah (Nia Sondaya) find Lottie after tracing her blood trail. Van (Liv Hewson) makes a map of all the strange symbols Taissa (Jasmin Savoy Brown) has found while sleepwalking and estimates where the last one could be, which is reminiscent of a clearing Lottie saw. There, they discover a disoriented Javi and take him back to the cabin, shocking everyone. While the group is relieved, they begin to question Taissa's sanity.

=== Present day ===
Natalie (Juliette Lewis) decides to accompany Lisa (Nicole Maines), her former captor, in going out for some errands. They stop to visit Lisa's mother's, Sybill (Jenn Griffin), who is not content with Lisa's role in the commune. After fighting with her mother, Lisa is comforted by Natalie.

After learning that Callie (Sarah Desjardins) has been lying about where she goes every night and finding Adam's charred ID in her bedroom, Shauna (Melanie Lynskey) takes her on a road trip. Alone, she admits she killed Adam and that Jeff (Warren Kole) was responsible for blackmailing her. Callie is shaken by the reveal, but promises not to tell anyone. Shauna informs Jeff that Callie now knows everything, but he is upset that Callie can now be considered an accomplice.

While travelling, Walter (Elijah Wood) explains to Misty (Christina Ricci) that he became a multi-millionaire for suing a scaffolding company after a brick fell on his head. As they head to New York, Walter convinces Misty to stay at a bed and breakfast, using separate rooms.

Taissa (Tawny Cypress) follows her fugue self's intuition, accepting a trucker's offer to hitchhike to an unknown location. The trucker takes Taissa to a small town in eastern Ohio. Upon entering a video store, she reunites with Van (Lauren Ambrose), their first encounter in years.

== Development ==
=== Production ===
The episode was written by co-executive producers Julia Bicknell and Liz Phang, and directed by Scott Winant. This marked Bicknell's first writing credit, Phang's third writing credit, and Winant's first directing credit.

=== Music ===
The episode's opening credits sequence uses a different rendition of the theme song, "No Return", with the theme sung by Alanis Morissette. She commented, "I love the original version of ‘No Return,’ It's just a perfect song. It was a little daunting to be asked to reinterpret it but I see parallels between Yellowjackets and my perspective while songwriting: the sheer intensity, that going for the jugular with no fear around going for the profane."

== Reception ==
=== Viewers ===
The episode was watched by 0.226 million viewers, earning a 0.03 in the 18-49 rating demographics on the Nielsen ratings scale. This means that 0.03 percent of all households with televisions watched the episode. This was a slight increase from the previous episode, which was watched by 0.210 million viewers with a 0.04 in the 18-49 demographics.

=== Critical reviews ===
"Old Wounds" received positive reviews from critics. The review aggregator website Rotten Tomatoes reported a 90% approval rating for the episode, with an average rating of 7.1/10 and based on 10 reviews.

Hattie Lindert of The A.V. Club gave the episode a "B+" and wrote, "If Yellowjackets' teen timeline refutes one classically-held ism, it has to be “cleanliness is closest to godliness.” As the months in the wilderness drag on, the laundry list of unmentionable acts the survivors are bonded over keeps getting longer; in short, they've never been more desperate for a miracle. In this world, clean hands don't get you closer to devout spirituality and the blessings that may or may not come with it — starvation does."

Erin Qualey of Vulture gave the episode a 4 star rating out of 5 and wrote, "As the second season of Yellowjackets progresses, it feels like all the characters are playing a real-life game of “Don't Break the Ice.” In an effort to protect their respective lives, they're all strategically knocking pieces free, but the center can only withstand constant erosion for so long." Proma Khosla of IndieWire gave the episode a "C+" and wrote, "Despite teeing up this showdown between Nat and Lottie — reason and faith — “Old Wounds” doesn't actually have much to say about that dichotomy. The episode reminds the audience that (to paraphrase Shauna's Jackie's hallucination in Season 1) these are kids, and this is awful."

Bernard Boo of Den of Geek gave the episode a 4.5 star rating out of 5 and wrote, "This week's episode, “Old Wounds,” ramps things up a bit, giving us two exciting reveals amid all the setup and foreshadowing." Erik Kain of Forbes wrote, "The good clearly outweighs the bad here, but it's those clunkier moments, the forced bits, the bits that feel less perfect than this show normally is, that really stand out. That's a shame. When a show is typically so adroit at just about everything it sets out to do, the weaknesses are bound to be glaring."

Coleman Spilde of The Daily Beast wrote, "This is the reunion that every hardcore Yellowjackets shipper has been anticipating, and it's sure to please them all. But I'm not yet sold. Taissa is doing more than just sleepwalking these days, she's wreaking full havoc. Van already made it out alive once; her odds of survival don't seem as good a second time around." Cade Taylor of Telltale TV gave the episode a 3.5 star rating out of 5 and wrote, "Filler episodes are present in any season of almost every series, and unfortunately, that's what “Old Wounds” consists of. Though not as captivating as previous episodes, it still serves its function by furthering the narrative and helping set up for what’s bound to be an explosive reunion for the adults in the coming episodes."

Esther Zuckerman of The New York Times wrote, "As the other grown up Yellowjackets tentatively open up their circles and reach out for help, Lottie is retreating into herself. She knows the results will most likely be disastrous." Brittney Bender of Bleeding Cool gave the episode a 9 out of 10 rating and wrote, "Showtime's Yellowjackets S02E04 "Old Wounds" brought up the tension with this episode. Even though it stretched itself far by dividing up attention between storylines, it produced a compelling journey towards the halfway point of the season."
