= Yellowjackets (TV series) =

American drama television series

- Genre: Psychological drama; Horror; Survival; Mystery; Thriller
- Created by: Ashley Lyle Bart Nickerson
- Showrunners: Ashley Lyle; Bart Nickerson; Jonathan Lisco
- Starring: Melanie Lynskey; Tawny Cypress; Ella Purnell; Sophie Nélisse; Jasmin Savoy Brown; Sophie Thatcher; Samantha Hanratty; Steven Krueger; Warren Kole; Christina Ricci; Juliette Lewis; Courtney Eaton; Liv Hewson; Kevin Alves; Simone Kessell; Lauren Ambrose; Sarah Desjardins; Nia Sondaya; Jenna Burgess
- Music by: Theodore Shapiro; Craig Wedren; Anna Waronker
- Opening theme: "No Return" by Craig Wedren and Anna Waronker (Note: The opening theme is first shown in the third episode of the first season.)
- Country of origin: United States
- Original language: English
- No. of seasons: 4
- No. of episodes: 30

Production
- Executive producers: Ashley Lyle; Bart Nickerson; Jonathan Lisco; Drew Comins; Jeff W. Byrd; Sarah L. Thompson; Ameni Rozsa; Julia Bicknell
- Production locations: Vancouver; Burnaby
- Cinematography: François Dagenais; Trevor Forrest; Julie Kirkwood; C. Kim Miles; Shasta Spahn; Michael Wale; Corey Robson
- Editors: Jeff Israel; Kindra Marra; Kevin D. Ross; Damien Smith; Plummy Tucker; Daniel Williams; Genevieve Butler
- Running time: 51–61 minutes
- Production companies: Lionsgate Television (Note: Credited as Entertainment One for seasons 1–2); Beer Christmas, Ltd.; Lockjaw (seasons 1–3); Paramount Television Studios (season 4); Showtime Networks

Original release
- Network: Showtime
- Release: November 14, 2021 – May 28, 2023
- Network: Paramount+ with Showtime
- Release: February 16, 2025 – present
- Network: Paramount+ Premium
- Release: November 20, 2026 – present

Yellowjackets is an American thriller drama television series created by Ashley Lyle and Bart Nickerson for Showtime. The series follows two primary storylines: the first involves a group of teenagers as they strive to survive in the wilderness after their plane crashes in 1996, while the second takes place 25 years later and focuses on the survivors' attempts to piece their lives back together. It stars a large ensemble cast led by Sophie Nélisse, Jasmin Savoy Brown, Sophie Thatcher, and Samantha Hanratty as the core teenage survivors, while Melanie Lynskey, Tawny Cypress, Juliette Lewis, and Christina Ricci portray their adult counterparts.

The premise of the series was inspired by the Andes flight disaster and the Donner Party. Lyle and Nickerson wanted to explore some of the best and worst in humanity, with their concept informed by interpersonal dynamics in social hierarchies, preconceived notions of behavior, and how trauma can shape one's life. The duo pitched their story to over a dozen networks, receiving offers from five. A number of networks passed on it due to the darkness of the story with teenage protagonists and no IP attached. Showtime acquired the rights in May 2018. The first season premiered on November 14, 2021, (Note: The first episode was released for free by Showtime on its platforms and on YouTube on November 6, 2021.) and the second on March 26, 2023. (Note: Episodes were made available for viewers on the standalone Showtime streaming app two days prior to the cable TV airing.) Production of the third season was halted due to the 2023 Hollywood labor disputes and premiered on February 16, 2025. (Note: Every episode was also available to stream two days earlier on the Paramount+ with Showtime plan.) In May 2025, the series was renewed for its fourth and final season, which premiered on Paramount+ Premium on November 20, 2026. (Note: Every episode will be released two days later on Paramount+ with Showtime.)

Yellowjackets has received critical praise for its performances, mystery elements and exploration of the past and present timelines. Its accolades include 10 Primetime Emmy Award nominations, including Outstanding Drama Series and acting nominations for Lynskey and Ricci; three Writers Guild of America Award nominations; five Television Critics Association Award nominations, a Peabody Award nomination, and a Critics' Choice Award. Yellowjackets is the second-most streamed series in Showtime history, and its third season drew the series' highest viewership to date.

== Premise ==
In 1996, a high school girls' soccer team from fictional Wiskayok, New Jersey, travels to Seattle for a national championship tournament. While flying over Canada, their plane crashes deep in the wilderness, and the surviving team members are left stranded for nineteen months. The series chronicles their attempts to stay alive as some of the team members are driven to cannibalism. It also focuses on the lives of the survivors 25 years later in 2021, as the events of their ordeal continue to affect them many years after their rescue.

== Cast and characters ==
Key
Main cast (actor receives "Starring" credit that season)
Recurring cast (actor appears in three or more episodes that season)
Guest cast (actor appears in one or two episodes that season)

Actor	Character	Yellowjackets			
Actor	Character	1	2	3	4
Main cast
Sophie Nélisse	Shauna Sadecki (née Shipman)	Main	Main	Main	Main
Melanie Lynskey	Shauna Sadecki (née Shipman)	Main	Main	Main	Main
Jasmin Savoy Brown	Taissa "Tai" Turner	Main	Main	Main	Main
Tawny Cypress	Taissa "Tai" Turner	Main	Main	Main	Main
Samantha Hanratty	Misty Quigley	Main	Main	Main	Main
Christina Ricci	Misty Quigley	Main	Main	Main	Main
Sophie Thatcher	Natalie "Nat" Scatorccio	Main	Main	Main	Main
Juliette Lewis	Natalie "Nat" Scatorccio	Main	Main		
Ella Purnell	Jackie Taylor	Main	Guest	Recurring	
Steven Krueger	Ben Scott	Main	Main	Main	Guest
Warren Kole	Jeff Sadecki	Main	Main	Main	Main
Kevin Alves	Travis Martinez	Recurring	Main	Main	Main
Courtney Eaton	Charlotte "Lottie" Matthews	Recurring	Main	Main	Main
Simone Kessell	Charlotte "Lottie" Matthews		Main	Main	
Liv Hewson	Vanessa "Van" Palmer	Recurring	Main	Main	Main
Lauren Ambrose	Vanessa "Van" Palmer		Main	Main	
Sarah Desjardins	Callie Sadecki	Recurring	Recurring	Main	Main
Nia Sondaya	Akilah		Recurring	Recurring	Main
Jenna Burgess	Melissa Kaplan		Co-star	Recurring	Main

=== Main ===
From left to right: Adult Misty, Ben Scott, teenage Misty, adult and teenage Taissa, adult and teenage Natalie, adult and teenage Shauna, Jackie, and adult Jeff

- Melanie Lynskey and Sophie Nélisse as the adult and teenage Shauna Sadecki, née Shipman, a member of the Yellowjackets soccer team.
- Tawny Cypress and Jasmin Savoy Brown as the adult and teenage Taissa Turner, a member of the Yellowjackets soccer team.
- Ella Purnell as Jackie Taylor (season 1; guest season 2; recurring season 3), the captain of the Yellowjackets soccer team.
- Christina Ricci and Samantha Hanratty as the adult and teenage Misty Quigley, the equipment manager of the Yellowjackets soccer team.
- Juliette Lewis (seasons 1–2) and Sophie Thatcher as the adult and teenage Natalie Scatorccio, a member of the Yellowjackets soccer team.
- Simone Kessell (seasons 2–3) and Courtney Eaton (seasons 2–4; recurring season 1) as the adult and teenage Charlotte "Lottie" Matthews, a member of the Yellowjackets soccer team.
- Lauren Ambrose (seasons 2–3) and Liv Hewson (seasons 2–4; recurring season 1) as the adult and teenage Vanessa "Van" Palmer, a member of the Yellowjackets soccer team.
- Steven Krueger as Ben Scott (seasons 1–3), the soccer team's assistant coach.
- Warren Kole as the adult Jeff Sadecki, Jackie's boyfriend and Shauna's husband.
  - Jack DePew, Owen Gates and Samuel Braun portray teenage versions of Jeff as guests in seasons 1, 2 and 4, respectively.
- Kevin Alves (seasons 2–4; recurring season 1) as the teenage Travis Martinez, Coach Martinez's eldest son and Javi's brother.
  - Andres Soto portrays an adult Travis as a recurring guest in seasons 1 and 2 as a dead body and in flashbacks.
- Sarah Desjardins as Callie Sadecki (seasons 3–4; recurring seasons 1–2), Jeff and Shauna's daughter.
- Nia Sondaya (season 4; recurring seasons 2–3) as Akilah, a member of the Yellowjackets soccer team.
  - Keeya King portrays Akilah as a recurring role in season 1.
- Jenna Burgess (season 4; co-star season 2; recurring season 3) as the teenage version of Melissa Kaplan, a member of the Yellowjackets soccer team.
  - Hilary Swank portrays the adult version of Melissa as a special guest in season 3 and as a recurring role in season 4.

=== Recurring ===
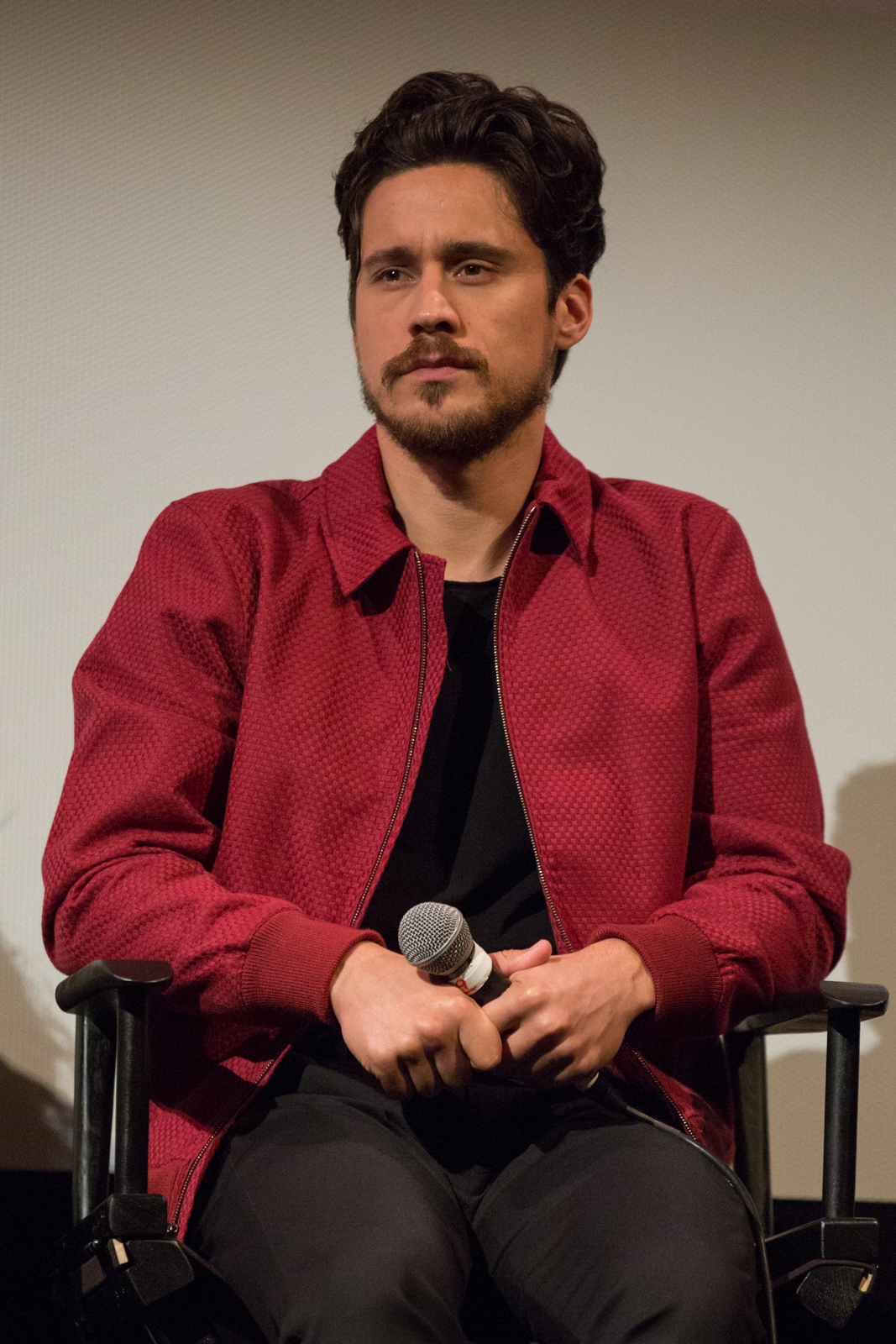
Peter Gadiot has a recurring role in the first season as Adam Martin.

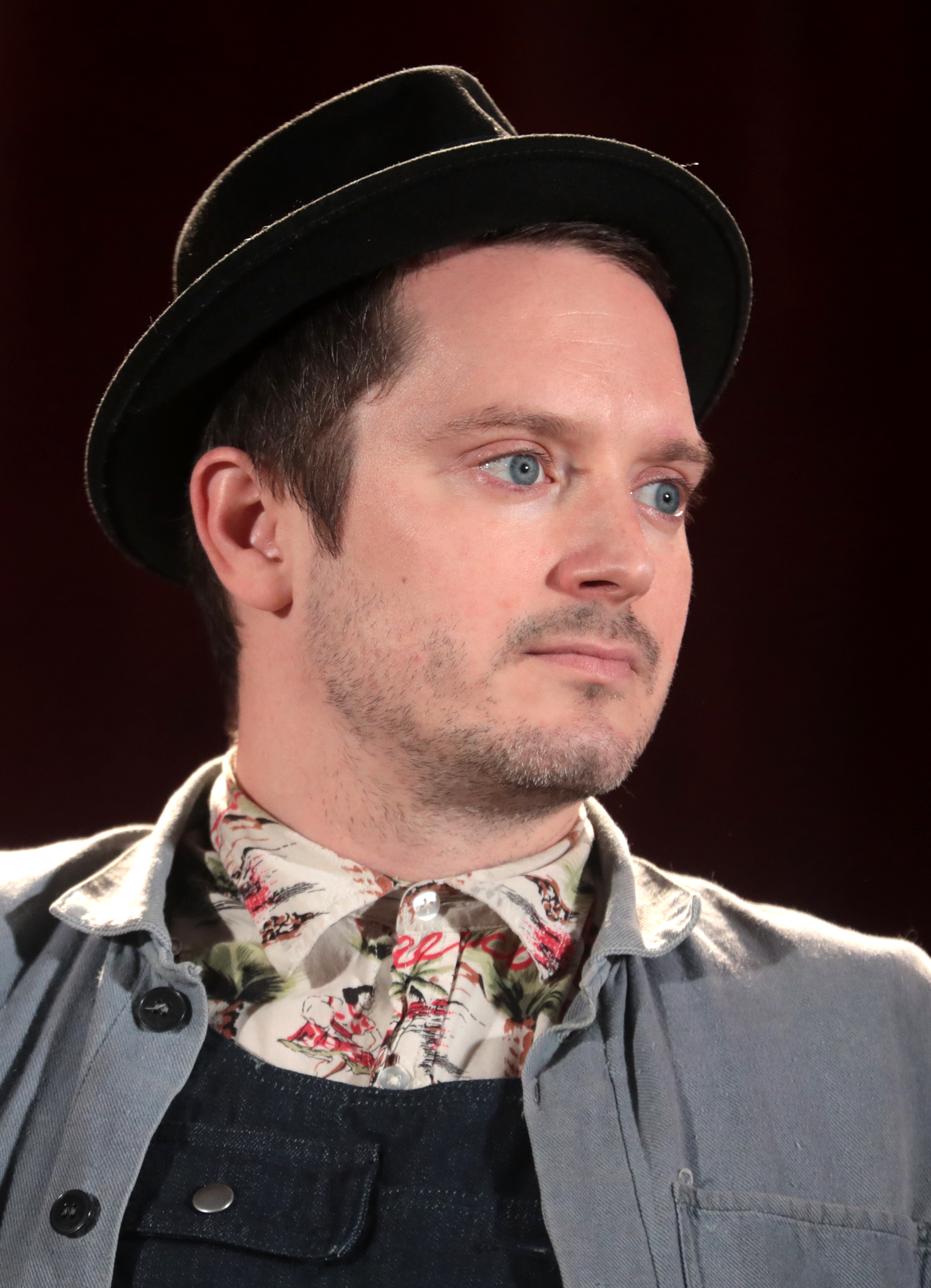
Elijah Wood joined the recurring cast as Walter Tattersall beginning in season 2.

- Jane Widdop as Laura Lee (season 1; guest season 2), a Christian member of the Yellowjackets soccer team.
- Alexa Barajas as Mariana "Mari" Ibarra (seasons 1–3), a member of the Yellowjackets soccer team.
- Rekha Sharma as Jessica Roberts (season 1), a reporter investigating the survivors of the plane crash.
- Rukiya Bernard as Simone Abara, Taissa's wife and Sammy's mother.
- Luciano Leroux as Javi Martinez (seasons 1–2), Coach Martinez's youngest son and Travis's brother.
- Aiden Stoxx as Sammy Abara-Turner, Taissa and Simone's son.
- Mya Lowe (seasons 1–2) and Vanessa Prasad (season 3) as Gen, a member of the Yellowjackets soccer team.
- Peter Gadiot as Adam Martin (season 1), an artist who has an affair with Shauna.
- Alex Wyndham (seasons 1–2) as the adult Kevyn Tan.
  - Charlie Wright and Sean Martin Savoy portray teenage versions of Kevyn as guests in seasons 1.
- Nicole Maines as Lisa (season 2–present), a follower of Lottie's.
- Nuha Jes Izman as Crystal (season 2), a member of the Yellowjackets soccer team.
- Elijah Wood as Walter Tattersall (seasons 2–4), a citizen detective who tries to help Misty.
- John Reynolds as Jay / Matt Saracusa (season 2), an undercover detective.
- François Arnaud as Paul (season 2), a New York writer and Coach Scott's secret boyfriend.
- Anisa Harris as Robin (season 3), a member of the Yellowjackets soccer team.
- Silvana Estifanos as Britt (season 3), a member of the Yellowjackets soccer team.
- Ashley Sutton as Hannah Sophia Finch (season 3), a frog scientist.
- Molly Ringwald as Victoria Palmer (season 4), Van's mother, a recently recovered alcoholic.
- June Squibb (season 4)

=== Guest ===
- Gabrielle Rose as Mrs. Taylor (season 1), Jackie's mother.
- Carlos Sanz as Coach Bill Martinez (season 1), the head coach of the Yellowjackets soccer team and Travis and Javi's father.
- Tonya Cornelisse and Pearl Amanda Dickson as the adult and teenage versions of Allie Stevens (season 1), a member of the Yellowjackets soccer team.
- John Cameron Mitchell as Caligula (season 2), the human personification of Misty's pet parrot.
- Nelson Franklin as Edwin (season 3), a frog scientist.
- Joel McHale as Kodiak (season 3), a wilderness guide hired by Edwin and Hannah.

== Episodes ==
Season	Episodes	Originally released		
Season	Episodes	First released	Last released	Network
1	10	November 14, 2021	January 16, 2022	Showtime
2	9	March 26, 2023	May 28, 2023	Showtime
3	10	February 16, 2025	April 13, 2025	Paramount+ with Showtime
4	10	November 20, 2026	January 22, 2027	Paramount+ with Showtime; Paramount+ Premium

=== Season 1 (2021–22) ===
No. overall	No. in season	Title	Directed by	Written by	Original release date	U.S. viewers (millions)
1	1	"Pilot"	Karyn Kusama	Ashley Lyle & Bart Nickerson	November 14, 2021	0.246
2	2	"F Sharp"	Jamie Travis	Jonathan Lisco & Ashley Lyle & Bart Nickerson	November 21, 2021	0.168
3	3	"The Dollhouse"	Eva Sørhaug	Sarah L. Thompson	November 28, 2021	0.210
4	4	"Bear Down"	Deepa Mehta	Liz Phang	December 5, 2021	0.161
5	5	"Blood Hive"	Eva Sørhaug	Ameni Rozsa	December 12, 2021	0.295
6	6	"Saints"	Bille Woodruff	Chantelle M. Wells	December 19, 2021	0.289
7	7	"No Compass"	Eva Sørhaug	Katherine Kearns	December 26, 2021	0.327
8	8	"Flight of the Bumblebee"	Ariel Kleiman	Cameron Brent Johnson & Liz Phang	January 2, 2022	0.311
9	9	"Doomcoming"	Daisy von Scherler Mayer	Ameni Rozsa & Sarah L. Thompson	January 9, 2022	0.419
10	10	"Sic Transit Gloria Mundi" (Note: Sic transit gloria mundi is a Latin phrase that means "Thus passes the glory of the world".)	Eduardo Sánchez	Ashley Lyle & Bart Nickerson	January 16, 2022	0.333

=== Season 2 (2023) ===
No. overall	No. in season	Title	Directed by	Written by	Original release date	U.S. viewers (millions)
11	1	"Friends, Romans, Countrymen"	Daisy von Scherler Mayer	Ashley Lyle & Bart Nickerson	March 26, 2023	0.226
12	2	"Edible Complex"	Ben Semanoff	Jonathan Lisco	April 2, 2023	N/A
13	3	"Digestif"	Jeffrey W. Byrd	Sarah L. Thompson & Ameni Rozsa	April 9, 2023	0.210
14	4	"Old Wounds"	Scott Winant	Julia Bicknell & Liz Phang	April 16, 2023	0.226
15	5	"Two Truths and a Lie"	Ben Semanoff	Katherine Kearns & Sarah L. Thompson	April 23, 2023	0.163
16	6	"Qui"	Liz Garbus	Karen Joseph Adcock & Ameni Rozsa	May 7, 2023	0.158
17	7	"Burial"	Anya Adams	Rich Monahan & Liz Phang	May 14, 2023	0.165
18	8	"It Chooses"	Daisy von Scherler Mayer	Sarah L. Thompson & Liz Phang	May 21, 2023	0.143
19	9	"Storytelling"	Karyn Kusama	Ameni Rozsa	May 28, 2023	0.134

=== Season 3 (2025) ===
No. overall	No. in season	Title	Directed by	Written by	Original release date	U.S. viewers (millions)
20	1	"It Girl"	Bart Nickerson	Jonathan Lisco & Ashley Lyle & Bart Nickerson	February 16, 2025	0.092
21	2	"Dislocation"	Bille Woodruff	Rich Monahan & Ameni Rozsa	February 16, 2025	0.071
22	3	"Them's the Brakes"	Jonathan Lisco	Jonathan Lisco & Ashley Lyle & Bart Nickerson	February 23, 2025	0.079
23	4	"12 Angry Girls and 1 Drunk Travis"	Jennifer Morrison	Julia Bicknell & Terry Wesley	March 2, 2025	0.058
24	5	"Did Tai Do That?"	Jeffrey W. Byrd	Sarah L. Thompson & Elise Brown	March 9, 2025	0.058
25	6	"Thanksgiving (Canada)"	Pete Chatmon	Libby Hill & Emily St. James	March 16, 2025	N/A
26	7	"Croak"	Jennifer Morrison	Alisha Brophy & Ameni Rozsa	March 23, 2025	0.068
27	8	"A Normal, Boring Life"	Anya Adams	Julia Bicknell	March 30, 2025	0.094
28	9	"How the Story Ends"	Ben Semanoff	Sarah L. Thompson	April 6, 2025	0.095
29	10	"Full Circle"	Bart Nickerson	Ameni Rozsa	April 13, 2025	0.125

=== Season 4 (2026–27) ===
No. overall	No. in season	Title	Directed by	Written by	Original release date	U.S. viewers (millions)
30	1	"Hivemind"	Bart Nickerson	Julia Bicknell & Elise Brown	November 20, 2026	TBD
31	2	"Human Interest"	TBA	Rich Monahan & Ameni Rozsa	November 27, 2026	TBD
32	3	"She's Made of Iron, Sir"	TBA	Kristen Layden & Terry Wesley	December 4, 2026	TBD
33	4	"Feed on the Weak"	TBA	Alisha Brophy & Michael Russo	December 11, 2026	TBD
34	5	"Gestalt"	TBA	Cameron B. Dupont & Sarah L. Thompson	December 18, 2026	TBD
35	6	TBA	TBA	Libby Hill & Emily St. James	December 25, 2026	TBD
36	7	TBA	TBA	Kristen Layden & Danny Mears	January 1, 2027	TBD
37	8	TBA	TBA	Sarah L. Thompson	January 8, 2027	TBD
38	9	TBA	TBA	Ameni Rozsa	January 15, 2027	TBD
39	10	TBA	TBA	TBA	January 22, 2027	TBD

== Production ==
=== Development ===
Series co-creators and co-showrunners Ashley Lyle and Bart Nickerson, who are married, came up with the premise of the story after they talked about the 1993 film Alive, an adaptation of the book Alive: The Story of the Andes Survivors (1974) which documents the 1972 Andes flight disaster. They are both fascinated by the story of the Uruguayan team and the Donner Party, which served as a "jumping-off point" for their concept. Nickerson introduced the notion of a "what if?" and they expanded upon that, discussing various ideas about characters and story. They were working on the pitch for the story in 2017 when they read a report on a "gender swapped" film adaptation of the 1954 novel Lord of the Flies being developed and found that the reaction comments were "brutal, but in a way that I thought was just deeply incorrect", Lyle said; people rejected the idea that young girls could descend into the same barbarism as young boys, which "just added fuel to our fire, really, because we just thought we can prove [that notion] wrong".

Lyle and Nickerson's concept was a "metaphor for teenage hierarchy", wanting "to tell what felt like a very real story about teenage girls" and explore "the best and worst that human beings are capable of". Lyle said that girls "learn early on how to make people like [them] and what the social hierarchies are. It's a more interesting way of having things fall away. ... It's a more layered amount of preconceived notions of how to behave and act." They wanted the title of the show to be the name of the girls' team, and chose Yellowjackets after it came up on a Google search for sports team names, finding it a "perfect fit thematically" as yellowjackets are "very dependent on a queen and the dynamics of the hive are very specific ... it's a small creature with a large sting."

Lyle and Nickerson pitched the series with a 35-minute presentation to 16–17 networks. They received offers from five. They made a five-season pitch, not with the intent of needing exactly five seasons but to show "how expansive the show and the idea can be", that it was a multi-season story, it was "something that can sort of reinvent itself and change and shift", and that they knew what they wanted it to be and where it was going. Lyle said that a number of networks stated that it was a "big swing of an idea" with no IP attached. A challenge they faced when pitching was networks being "aware of their brands" and tending to place shows with teenage protagonists into a young adult box. Some networks saw the show differently from their concept. "Shows about teenagers or that feature teenagers with ambitions to be something other than a classic YA show tend to frighten people a little bit", Lyle noted. "They aren't something with a long track record."

Lyle said the smartest question she heard during the pre-production phase was from HBO's Francesca Orsi and David Levine, who asked, "What are you trying to say with this show?" In his answer, Nickerson said they intended to deconstruct the "organizing principles of a society". HBO was a contender to purchase the series but ultimately rejected it as they were developing Euphoria, which has teenage protagonists. Yellowjackets was sold to The Mark Gordon Company, a production company owned by Entertainment One. The project was then pitched to Gary Levine, president of entertainment for Showtime Networks, who was immediately on board. The creators said that Showtime supported "the darker and weirder qualities" of the story. On May 9, 2018, Showtime announced it had acquired the rights to the series.

The use of two timelines expanded the exploration of the characters' interpersonal dynamics and the effects of their traumas. Although the series was originally set with the crash in the 1970s and the aftermath in the 1990s, both time periods were moved forward so that the crash took place in 1996 and their life as adults in 2021. This switch made the setting more familiar to viewers and aided the production in working with one historical era and one contemporary era. The showrunners explained cannibalism's role in the story:

Cannibalism is revolting and we have a moral aversion to it. It represents the complete deconstruction of society. We all agree there isn't anything more taboo. It's the most extreme distillation of everything that it is to be a human being ... There's obviously the survival aspect of it but there's also something so fascinating to me about the different ways in which the act has functioned in various societies ... For these girls, this is the ultimate cost and consequence of true and absolute freedom. They're never more alive than when they're in this feral state and it plagues them as adults ... moral codes are broken but we wanted to find the why and the humanity even within the outcome.

The show takes place in New Jersey, the state Lyle and Nickerson both grew up in. The duo is credited as showrunners alongside Jonathan Lisco, who was brought to the series by executive producer Karyn Kusama.

On December 16, 2021, after the first five episodes aired, Showtime renewed the series for a second season. Levine said that the network had "not heard the pitch for season 2, the writers ... are going to come together in January." On the planned length of the show, Lyle and Nickerson stated in January 2022 that the story will inform them how many seasons it will be. "We have no interest in dragging this show out past its due time. We do have a multiseason arc; we strongly feel we have multiple seasons of story to tell. But at a certain point, we're going to realize that the story wants to end. And I hope that the audience is reassured that we don't intend to beat a dead horse." In February, Levine said the creators had "always given us hints about things to come, but we haven't done a long-range plan. We wanted to make the first season count. ... I love that they have some general idea of a five-year arc, but we take it one season at a time and get very granular about making it satisfying." By May 2022, the writers were stated to be in the initial stage of writing the scripts for season two.

On December 15, 2022, three months ahead of the second-season premiere, Showtime renewed the series for a third season. Writing began on May 1, 2023, but halted the next day in accordance with the 2023 Writers Guild of America strike. In June 2023, Lyle said that a bonus episode would air between the second and third seasons. However, in December 2024, Lyle confirmed its delay: "The truth is that there is a bonus episode but we may need to wait a bit longer for it."

Showtime renewed the series for a fourth season on May 20, 2025. In October, it was announced as the series' final season, with production starting in 2026 and the season premiering that year. Lyle and Nickerson stated:

After three incredible seasons, and great consideration, we're excited to announce that we will be bringing the story of Yellowjackets to its twisted conclusion in this fourth and final season. We've always known there would come a point when the story would tell us it wants to end, and it's our belief that our job — our responsibility — is to listen. Telling this emotional, wild, and deeply human story has been a profoundly meaningful experience and a true honor for us.

=== Casting ===
==== Season 1 ====
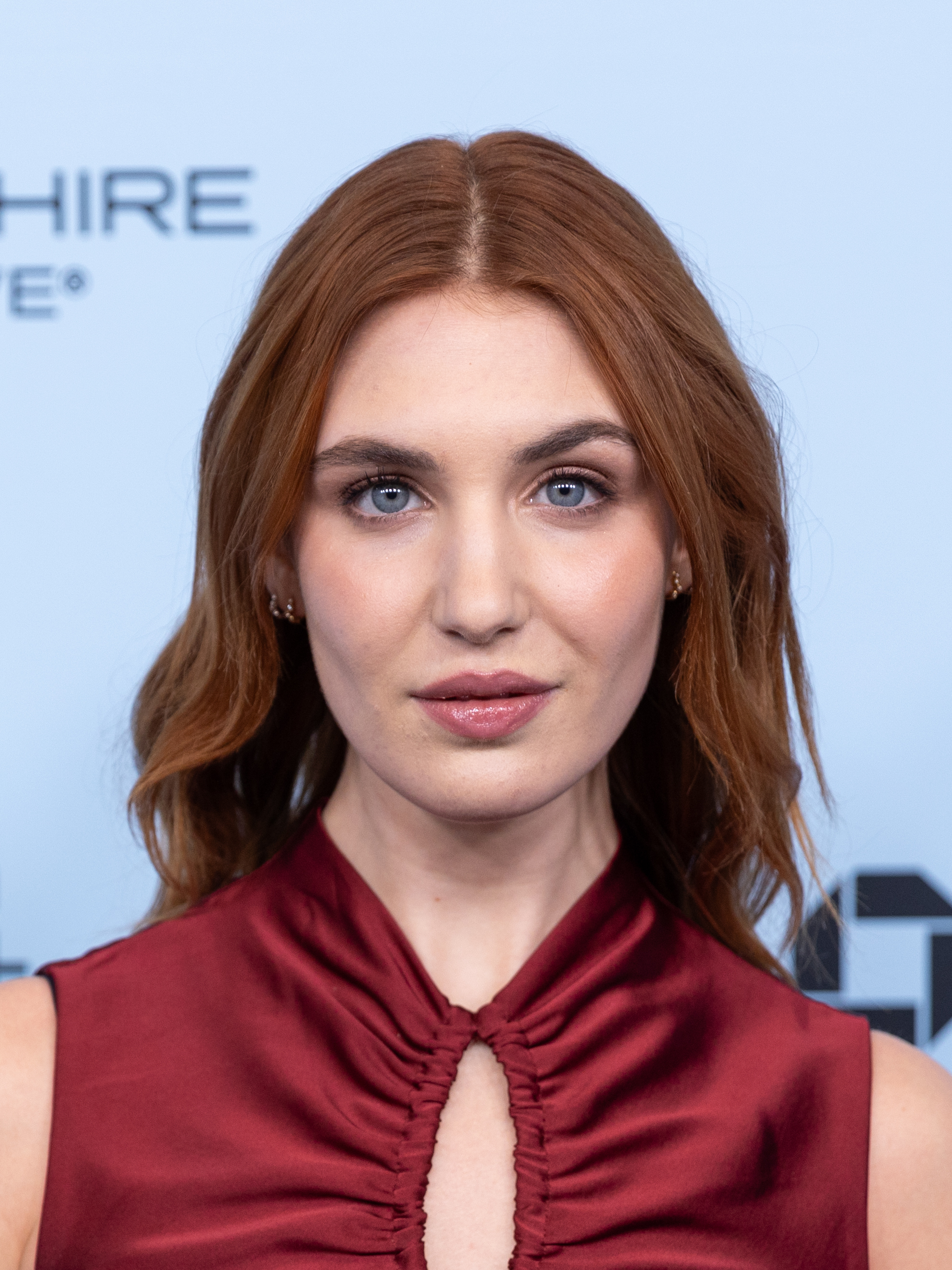
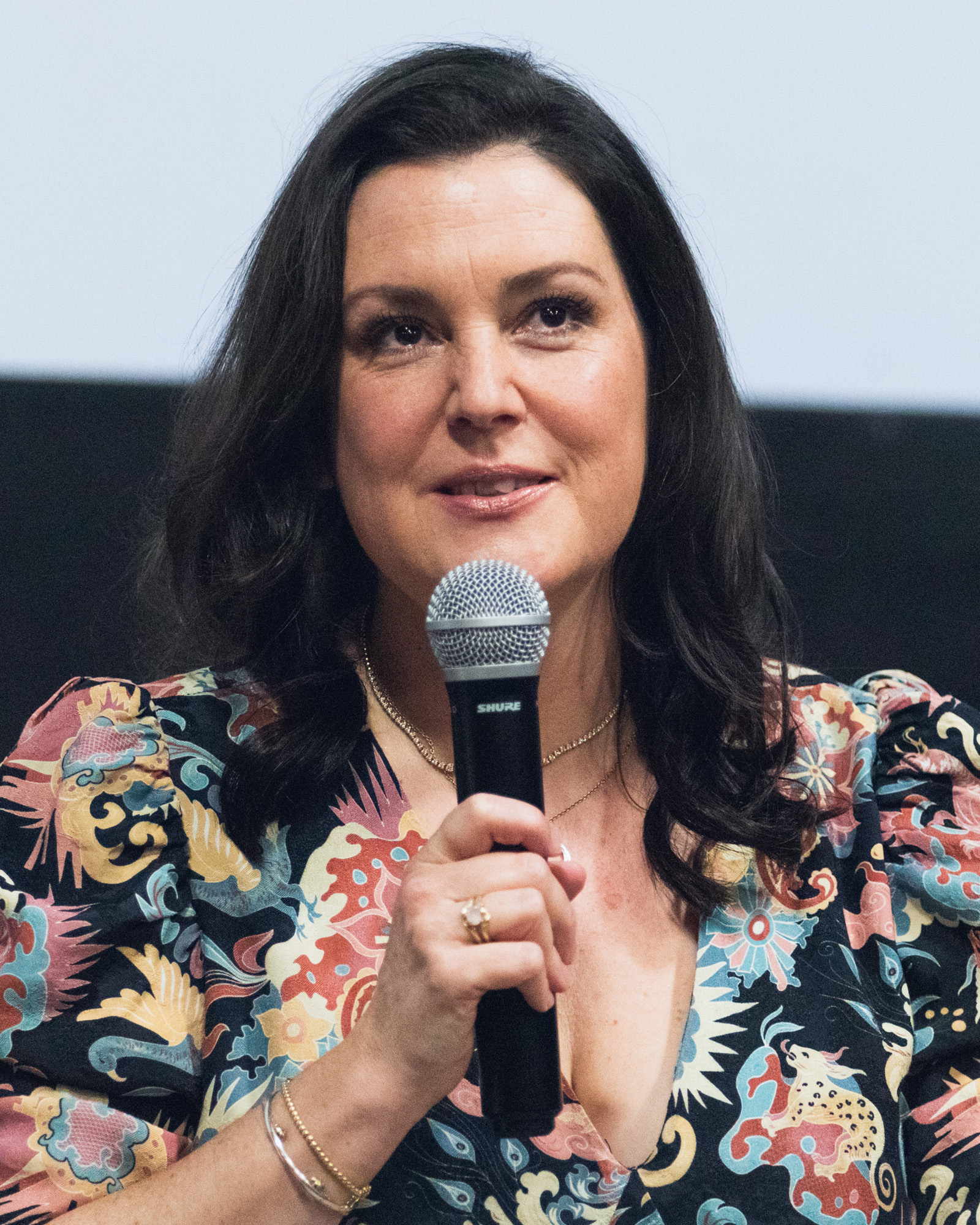
Sophie Nélisse and Melanie Lynskey star as the teenage and adult versions of Shauna.

The pilot episode was not written with any actresses in mind, and auditions were held in Los Angeles. "We decided pretty early on we weren't going to get overly focused on a physical match," Lyle mentioned. As a result, some cast members had to dye their hair and wear contact lenses to match the physical characteristics of their counterparts. Melanie Lynskey was the first person to join the cast. Lyle said the role of Shauna was "the trickiest to cast" because they "wanted to find an actress who could embody somebody who is really trying to figure out who they are, which is kind of a tricky internal thing to express through her acting". Lynskey questioned the showrunners and extracted as much information as she could about her character's past and the long-term storyline to improve her performance. For the role of Natalie, Nickerson said they searched for "someone who was really free-spirited and unique who could play both a sort of wildness and a vulnerability". Though most of the auditions were held in person, Sophie Thatcher submitted a self-recorded audition tape and was cast as Natalie before Juliette Lewis, who portrays the character's adult counterpart. When asked if the group's survival would depend on their gender, Thatcher replied, "I think naturally, especially at such a young age, women are more emotionally intelligent. So to turn into that cannibalistic mindset ... it maybe took them longer just because I think women are smarter than men. But I think that's it. Besides that, there's no difference. They're going to go batshit crazy."

Nickerson said it was vital to find two actresses who could portray Misty with "a deep kind of humanity that could make it feel lived in and real"; the role was eventually given to Sammi Hanratty and Christina Ricci. On joining the cast, Hanratty said she originally auditioned for the role of Natalie before being brought back four times to audition for the role of Misty: "I'm not gonna lie, I was so crushed [when I didn't get Natalie] because I loved the project. They said they would keep me in mind. Then, I think it was about a week later that I got the audition for Misty, which was so exciting. Because I was like, 'Oh, this girl is interesting as can be." To give her another chance, Lyle and Nickerson wrote a scene specifically for the casting process in which Misty confronts a teacher over cheating. After Hanratty was brought back, Lyle said "It was immediate. As soon as she read that scene for us, we said, 'OK, she is Misty.'" Hanratty described the auditions as being "really intense". She did not meet any of her co-stars until the table read for the pilot. When asked if she was treated differently when in costume, she added, "I don't think we've talked about this, but I was seeing a therapist while I was in Canada, and that was something that we discussed. I was definitely treated differently ... I got more self-conscious, and my walk even changed a bit. I just felt like a bigger target, you know, as a person."

According to Nickerson, Jasmin Savoy Brown and Tawny Cypress were cast as Taissa because they were both able to portray her with a "level of dynamic strength" as well as "vulnerability and fragility". Ella Purnell portrays Jackie, a character who proved difficult to cast. Lyle said the character was supposed to be a stereotypical popular girl with "little cracks of that façade". She explained, "I think that her insecurity, her vulnerabilities needed to be on display pretty early on or you'd end up hating her and that was sort of the opposite of what we wanted the audience to feel." Lynskey, Cypress, and Brown were announced as series regulars in October 2019, with Lewis, Ricci, Purnell, Hanratty, Thatcher, and Sophie Nélisse joining the cast in November. The following month, Ava Allan, Courtney Eaton, and Liv Hewson were cast in recurring roles. In June 2021, it was reported Warren Kole, Peter Gadiot, Keeya King, Alex Wyndham, Sarah Desjardins, Kevin Alves, and Alexa Barajas would also star.

==== Season 2 ====
Casting for the second season began in mid-2022. In August 2022, Lauren Ambrose and Simone Kessell joined the cast to play the adult versions of Van and Lottie; their roles were also upped from recurring to series regulars. Elijah Wood and Nuha Jes Izman were also added to the cast in season-long recurring guest roles, while Kevin Alves's role as teenage Travis was upped from recurring to series regular. Wood plays Walter, "new citizen detective who is not represented by a younger self on the show". Jason Ritter, who is married to Melanie Lynskey, guest stars in one episode of the second season.

In January 2023, Variety reported that Keeya King, who played teen Akilah in season one, had exited the series. Her role was recast with Nia Sondaya. Nicole Maines was cast as Lisa, an associate of adult Lottie attempting to recover from past trauma. Additionally, François Arnaud guest-stars in four episodes portraying Paul. His character is described as "a New York writer and secret boyfriend of Coach Scott (Steven Kreuger) who reminds Coach Scott of what might have been".

==== Seasons 3 and 4 ====
In September 2024, it was announced that Hilary Swank was cast in a recurring role for the third season. In February 2026, Nia Sondaya, who plays Akilah, was promoted to series regular for the fourth season. Also in February, Molly Ringwald and June Squibb were announced to have been cast in the fourth season.

=== Filming ===
The pilot was greenlit in September 2019 and shot in Los Angeles in November. According to location manager Jimmie Lee, several scenes from the pilot were filmed on top of the ski slopes on Mammoth Mountain. A number of scenes set in the high school were filmed in and around John Marshall High School in Los Feliz, Los Angeles. In the pilot's opening scene, a flash-forward shows a group covered in fur clothing. Hanratty was the only cast member present while the scene was shot and the other characters were played by stunt coordinators. Hanratty says the writers have not told the cast which characters appear in that scene: "We all have our theories on who that is too, and we have a group chat in our cast where we try to come up with theories ourselves of what's going on and who we think is who."

In December 2020, Showtime gave Yellowjackets a series order. Filming restarted in Vancouver on May 10, 2021, and concluded in October, with the young and older cast taking weekly turns to shoot their scenes. Aside from Vancouver, other filming locations included the Panther Paintball & Airsoft Sports Park in Surrey, which was used as the site of the plane crash, and The Bridge Studios in Burnaby. The plane crash scene took two days to shoot. In an interview, Lynskey said Cypress, Ricci, and Lewis stood up for her after she was body shamed by a crew member, with Lewis writing a letter to the producers on her behalf. In November 2021, Purnell summarized the timeline of the production: "Here's how it went; we shot the pilot, we took like a year and a half off in COVID and then we went to Canada and shot the whole season in six months. We were in this super intense immersive bubble. We wrapped three weeks ago and now I'm doing a press junket. It's been crazy."

Filming for the second season began in August 2022, with the first episode directed by Daisy von Scherler Mayer. In early February 2023, the cast of the 1990s timeline of the series completed filming their scenes.

Filming for season three started on May 14, 2024, after having been delayed because of the WGA and SAG-AFTRA strike. Co-showrunners Bart Nickerson and Jonathan Lisco made their directorial debuts this season, with Nickerson helming the premiere and Lisco episode three.

Filming for the fourth and final season began on March 2, 2026.

=== Music ===
The music for the pilot was composed by Theodore Shapiro. The rest of the first season was scored by Craig Wedren and Anna Waronker, members of the rock bands Shudder to Think and That Dog, respectively. Wedren was invited to the series by Kusama after the series was picked up and Shapiro was unable to return. The main theme song, "No Return", was written and performed by Wedren and Waronker, who said they "aimed to channel our off-kilter '90s roots into something that felt like 'then', but could only have been made now, just like the show". Lyle and Nickerson were initially hesitant with the idea of featuring a theme song due to their growing rarity in the mainstream but were eventually convinced otherwise. "Mother Mother" by Tracy Bonham was used as the temp music for the theme, which first appears in episode three and features the sounds of a Farfisa organ. According to Wedren, "The producers really, really encouraged us to go out on multiple limbs and really be experimental and try stuff, which is such a rare direction to get". Lakeshore Records made "No Return" available to stream and download on January 6, 2022. A soundtrack album was also released on Spotify. On March 9, 2023, Florence and the Machine released a cover of No Doubt's "Just a Girl" as a single to promote the second season. The fourth, seventh and ninth episodes of the second season featured a cover of the show's theme song by Alanis Morissette, which was released as a single on April 14, 2023.

Track listing

No.	Title	Performer(s)	Length
1.	"Uninvited"	Alanis Morissette	4:36
2.	"Today"	The Smashing Pumpkins	3:22
3.	"Supernova"	Liz Phair	2:48
4.	"Informer"	Snow	4:28
5.	"Shoop"	Salt-N-Pepa	4:08
6.	"Good Vibrations"	Marky Mark and the Funky Bunch, Loleatta Holloway	4:29
7.	"What If..."	Dore Soul	3:39
8.	"Let Me Find Out"	POS NEG	3:15
9.	"Miss World"	Hole	3:00
10.	"Counting Backwards"	Throwing Muses	3:15
11.	"Down by the Water"	PJ Harvey	3:14
12.	"Never Tear Us Apart"	Paloma Faith	3:04
13.	"Hold On"	Wilson Phillips	4:26
14.	"Medusa"	Noonday Devils	2:35
15.	"Confetti"	Bien	5:18
16.	"Kick It"	Peaches	2:33
17.	"Glory Box"	Portishead	5:08
18.	"Mother Mother"	Tracy Bonham	3:00
19.	"Mr. Mistoffelees"	Andrew Lloyd Webber, Cats 1983 Broadway Cast, Timothy Scott, Terrence Mann	4:25
20.	"Cambodia"	Kim Wilde	3:56
21.	"Dreams"	The Cranberries	4:31
22.	"Grandma's Hands"	Bill Withers	2:01
23.	"Vienna"	Ultravox	4:38
24.	"Mountain Song"	Jane's Addiction	4:02
25.	"Breakfast at Tiffany's"	Deep Blue Something	4:17
26.	"Feel the Pain"	Dinosaur Jr.	4:19
27.	"Maid in China"	The Father Figures	3:05
28.	"So Alive"	Love and Rockets	4:17
29.	"Ready to Go"	Republica	5:01
30.	"This Is How We Do It"	Montell Jordan, Wino	3:58
31.	"Emergency"	Sofi Tukker, Novak, YAX.X	3:12
32.	"Freak Out"	Nightlapse, Bambie	3:19
33.	"Munich"	Editors	3:46
34.	"Love Comes Close"	Cold Cave	4:25
35.	"Overture"	Andrew Lloyd Webber, The Phantom of the Opera Original London Cast	3:05
36.	"S P A C E"	Amber Mark	3:25
37.	"The Music of the Night"	Andrew Lloyd Webber, The Phantom of the Opera Original London Cast, Michael Crawford	5:41
38.	"Firestarter"	The Prodigy	4:39
39.	"Fade into You"	Mazzy Star	4:55
40.	"The World I Know"	Collective Soul	4:15
41.	"Gepetto"	Belly	3:23
42.	"Kiss from a Rose"	Seal	4:48
43.	"Rump Shaker"	Wreckx-N-Effect	5:12
44.	"The Haunted"	Dot Allison, Amy Bowman	6:20
45.	"Ladykillers"	Lush	3:13
46.	"Come Out and Play"	The Offspring	3:17
47.	"All That She Wants"	Ace of Base	3:31
48.	"I Touch Myself"	Divinyls	3:47
49.	"Only Time"	Enya	3:38
50.	"Livin' on the Edge"	Aerosmith	6:21
51.	"No Return (Main Title Theme)"	Craig Wedren, Anna Waronker	1:33

== Release ==
A premiere for the series was held on November 10, 2021, at the Hollywood Legion Post 43 in Los Angeles. Yellowjackets debuted on Showtime on November 14. The second season premiered on March 26, 2023, and the episodes became available two days earlier to stream for Showtime subscribers. In November 2024, it was announced that the third season would premiere on February 14, 2025, for Paramount+ subscribers with the Paramount+ with Showtime plan, before making its air debut on Showtime two days later. The fourth and the final season premiered on November 20, 2026, for subscribers with the Paramount+ Premium plan, before making its air debut on Showtime two days later.

The first season was released on DVD and manufactured-on-demand Blu-ray on July 19, 2022. The second season was released on DVD and Blu-ray on October 10, 2023. The third season was released on DVD on November 3, 2026.

== Reception ==
=== Critical response ===
Critical response of Yellowjackets
Season	Rotten Tomatoes	Metacritic
1	100% (77 reviews)	78 (28 reviews)
2	94% (171 reviews)	77 (30 reviews)
3	84% (134 reviews)	64 (25 reviews)
4	82% (22 reviews)	58 (10 reviews)

==== Season 1 ====
On the review aggregator website Rotten Tomatoes, 100% of 77 critics' reviews are positive, with an average rating of 8.2/10. The website's consensus reads: "A genre mashup that blends smoothly, Yellowjackets presents an absorbing mystery with plenty of sting." Metacritic, which uses a weighted average, assigned a score of 78 out of 100 based on 28 critics, indicating "generally favorable" reviews.

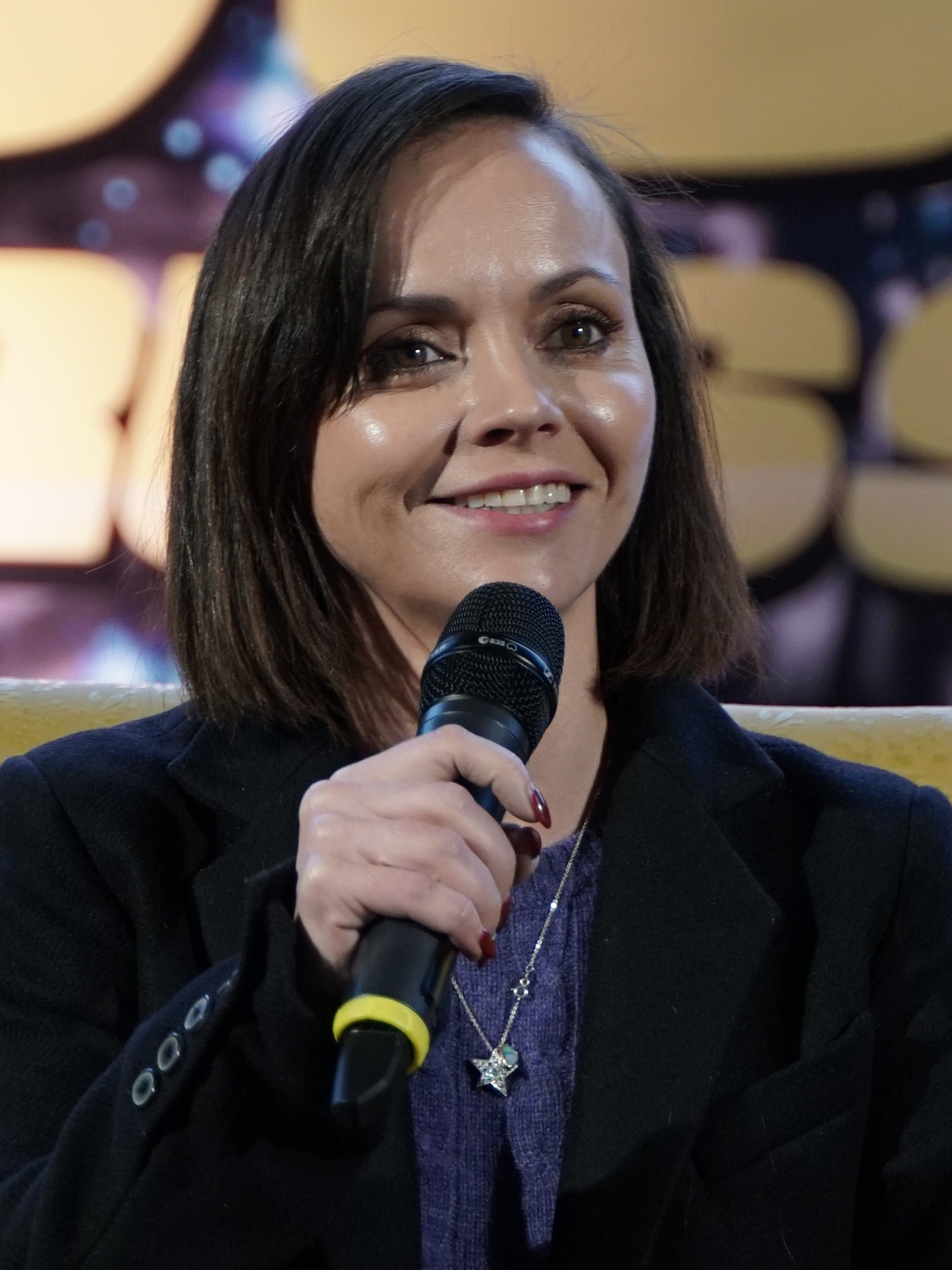
The performances of the cast, especially Christina Ricci (pictured) and Melanie Lynskey's, were praised by critics.

The first six out of ten episodes of the first season were given to critics to review ahead of the series premiere. Entertainment Weekly's Kristen Baldwin graded the show with a B+ and gave praise to the performances and its story:

Yellowjackets maintains an intriguing tonal balance in early episodes. The survival timeline is pure horror, all steadily increasing dread and glimpses of grotesque violence. It helps that the flashback cast is strong enough to carry an entire drama on their own; standouts Brown, Thatcher, and Nélisse are particularly adept at delivering performances that feel distinct and yet authentically echo the personas of their adult counterparts.

Candice Frederick from TheWrap found the storyline to be a bit complicated:

Yellowjackets can feel tiresome with the sheer frequency of all those flashbacks, and the fact that it dabbles in too many genres when it could settle on its solid mystery thriller elements. But when it commits to its chilling suspense, the show is utterly fascinating to watch. Even more, it finds compelling ways to explore issues like trauma and the façades we build for ourselves that carry from youth through adulthood—elevating what would otherwise be a much flatter genre piece.

Writing for Rolling Stone, Alan Sepinwall gave the series three stars and a half out of four and described it as a combination of Lord of the Flies, It, Lost, Alone, and the works of Megan Abbott. Sepinwall added that "many of its influences already overlap, and thus work together well. The ones that don't can at times combine to create something that feels new and potent, but at others make it feel like the stew could have done with fewer ingredients."

==== Season 2 ====
On the review aggregator website Rotten Tomatoes, 94% of 171 critics' reviews are positive, with an average rating of 8.15/10. The website's consensus reads: "Having already made a startling first impression, Yellowjackets coils itself in a second season preparing for the long haul—thankfully, its superb performances and mesmeric ambience are fine substitutes for fast answers." Metacritic, which uses a weighted average, assigned a score of 77 out of 100 based on 30 critics, indicating "generally favorable" reviews.

==== Season 3 ====
On the review aggregator website Rotten Tomatoes, 84% of 134 critics' reviews are positive, with an average rating of 7.25/10. The website's consensus reads: "Still at its very best when lost in the wilderness, Yellowjackets' third season is inescapably uneven but carried along effortlessly by its stronger elements." Metacritic assigned a score of 64 out of 100 based on 25 critics, indicating "generally favorable" reviews.

==== Season 4 ====
On the review aggregator website Rotten Tomatoes, 82% of 22 critics' reviews are positive, with an average rating of 6.9/10. Metacritic assigned a score of 58 out of 100 based on 10 critics, indicating "mixed or average" reviews.

=== Critics' top ten list ===
2021
- No. 2 The A.V. Club (Eric Thurm)
- No. 2 Vanity Fair
- No. 3 Chicago Sun-Times
- No. 3 Houston Press
- No. 5 The Playlist
- No. 6 RogerEbert.com (Brian Tallerico)
- No. 6 Time
- No. 7 Reason
- No. 8 The A.V. Club (Danette Chavez)
- No. 8 The Ringer
- No. 9 Nylon
- No. 9 Variety (Caroline Framke)
- No. 10 Film School Rejects
- – Los Angeles Times (Lorraine Ali)
- – Nerdist
- – New York Post
- – Vox
- – Wired

2022
- No. 3 PopBuzz
- No. 4 Exclaim!
- No. 7 Polygon
- No. 10 The A.V. Club

=== Ratings ===
Yellowjackets is the second-most streamed series in Showtime's history behind Dexter: New Blood. According to Showtime, the penultimate episode of the first season was watched by 1.41 million viewers across all platforms, while the season finale (the first episode to not air after an episode of Dexter: New Blood) brought 1.3 million viewers across all platforms. Yellowjackets averaged more than 5 million weekly viewers, the highest for a freshman series on the network since Billions in 2016. In January 2022, Vulture's Alison Willmore and Kathryn VanArendonk discussed Showtime's decision to release episodes weekly instead of launching the entire season on the same day, noting the positive word-of-mouth and time given to a viewer to theorize: "In an era when shows and movies seem to barely manage to break through before being pushed aside by whatever's new, and when Netflix is so dominant that other platforms have to really fight for attention at all, Yellowjackets has sustained a conversation all while airing on Showtime."

The third season became the show's most-watched season yet. The season premiere garnered over two million viewers in its opening weekend, most of it from streaming, which is a 58% increase over the second season's premiere. The season finale drew three million cross-platform viewers in its first seven days, marking a 19% cross-platform increase and a 54% streaming increase from the season two finale, as well as the series' highest-viewed season finale yet.

=== Awards and nominations ===
Awards and nominations received by Yellowjackets
Award	Date of ceremony	Category	Nominee(s)	Result	Ref.
AACTA International Awards	February 10, 2024	Best Drama Series	Yellowjackets	Nominated	
Art Directors Guild Awards	February 10, 2024	Excellence in Production Design for a One-Hour Contemporary Single-Camera Series	Margot Ready (for "Digestif")	Nominated	
Artios Awards	March 9, 2023	Outstanding Achievement in Casting – Television Pilot and First Season Drama Series	Junie Lowry Johnson, Libby Goldstein, Corinne Clark, Jennifer Page, Josh Ropiequet	Won	
Artios Awards	March 7, 2024	Outstanding Achievement in Casting – Television Drama Series	Junie Lowry Johnson, Libby Goldstein, Corinne Clark, Jennifer Page, Josh Ropiequet, Rebecca Davidson	Nominated	
Critics' Choice Awards	March 13, 2022	Best Actress in a Drama Series	Melanie Lynskey	Won	
Critics' Choice Awards	March 13, 2022	Best Drama Series	Yellowjackets	Nominated	
Critics' Choice Awards	January 14, 2024	Best Supporting Actress in a Drama Series	Christina Ricci	Nominated	
Critics' Choice Super Awards	March 17, 2022	Best Horror Series	Yellowjackets	Won	
Critics' Choice Super Awards	March 17, 2022	Best Actress in a Horror Series	Melanie Lynskey	Won	
Critics' Choice Super Awards	April 4, 2024	Best Horror Series, Limited Series or Made-for-TV Movie	Yellowjackets	Nominated	
Critics' Choice Super Awards	April 4, 2024	Best Actress in a Horror Series, Limited Series or Made-for-TV Movie	Melanie Lynskey	Nominated	
Critics' Choice Super Awards	August 7, 2025	Best Actress in a Horror Series, Limited Series or Made-for-TV Movie	Melanie Lynskey	Nominated	
Final Draft Awards	March 16, 2022	New Voice Award (TV)	Ashley Lyle and Bart Nickerson	Won	
GLAAD Media Awards	April 2, 2022	Outstanding New TV Series	Yellowjackets	Nominated	
GLAAD Media Awards	March 14, 2024	Outstanding Drama Series	Yellowjackets	Won	
Golden Globe Awards	January 7, 2024	Best Supporting Actress – Series, Miniseries or Television Film	Christina Ricci	Nominated	
Golden Trailer Awards	June 29, 2023	Best Horror/Thriller Poster for a TV/Streaming Series	"Teen Queen" (AV Print)	Nominated	
Gracie Awards	April 13, 2022	Actress in a Leading Role – Drama	Melanie Lynskey	Won	
Gotham Independent Film Awards	November 28, 2022	Breakthrough Series – Long Form	Yellowjackets	Nominated	
Gotham Independent Film Awards	November 28, 2022	Outstanding Performance in a New Series	Melanie Lynskey	Nominated	
Hollywood Critics Association Creative Arts TV Awards	January 8, 2024	Best Guest Actress in a Drama Series	Ella Purnell	Nominated	
Hollywood Critics Association Creative Arts TV Awards	January 8, 2024	Best Casting in a Drama Series	Yellowjackets	Nominated	
Hollywood Critics Association Creative Arts TV Awards	January 8, 2024	Best Contemporary Costumes	Yellowjackets	Nominated	
Hollywood Critics Association Awards	August 13, 2022	Best Actress in a Broadcast Network or Cable Series, Drama	Juliette Lewis	Nominated	
Hollywood Critics Association Awards	August 13, 2022	Best Actress in a Broadcast Network or Cable Series, Drama	Melanie Lynskey	Won	
Hollywood Critics Association Awards	August 13, 2022	Best Cable Network Series, Drama	Yellowjackets	Nominated	
Hollywood Critics Association Awards	August 13, 2022	Best Directing in a Broadcast Network or Cable Series, Drama	Karyn Kusama (for "Pilot")	Won	
Hollywood Critics Association Awards	August 13, 2022	Best Supporting Actress in a Broadcast Network or Cable Series, Drama	Christina Ricci	Nominated	
Hollywood Critics Association Awards	August 13, 2022	Best Writing in a Broadcast Network or Cable Series, Drama	Ashley Lyle and Bart Nickerson (for "Pilot")	Nominated	
Hollywood Critics Association Awards	January 8, 2024	Best Cable Series, Drama	Yellowjackets	Nominated	
Hollywood Critics Association Awards	January 8, 2024	Best Actress in a Broadcast Network or Cable Series, Drama	Juliette Lewis	Nominated	
Hollywood Critics Association Awards	January 8, 2024	Best Actress in a Broadcast Network or Cable Series, Drama	Melanie Lynskey	Nominated	
Hollywood Critics Association Awards	January 8, 2024	Best Supporting Actor in a Broadcast Network or Cable Series, Drama	Elijah Wood	Nominated	
Hollywood Critics Association Awards	January 8, 2024	Best Supporting Actress in a Broadcast Network or Cable Series, Drama	Christina Ricci	Nominated	
Hollywood Critics Association Awards	January 8, 2024	Best Supporting Actress in a Broadcast Network or Cable Series, Drama	Lauren Ambrose	Nominated	
Hollywood Critics Association Awards	January 8, 2024	Best Supporting Actress in a Broadcast Network or Cable Series, Drama	Sophie Thatcher	Nominated	
Hollywood Critics Association Awards	January 8, 2024	Best Directing in a Broadcast Network or Cable Series, Drama	Ben Semanoff (for "Edible Complex")	Nominated	
Hollywood Critics Association Awards	January 8, 2024	Best Directing in a Broadcast Network or Cable Series, Drama	Karyn Kusama (for "Storytelling")	Nominated	
Hollywood Critics Association Awards	January 8, 2024	Best Writing in a Broadcast Network or Cable Series, Drama	Jonathan Lisco (for "Edible Complex")	Nominated	
Hollywood Critics Association Awards	January 8, 2024	Best Writing in a Broadcast Network or Cable Series, Drama	Liz Phang and Rich Monahan (for "Burial" )	Nominated	
Hollywood Critics Association Awards	June 10, 2025	Best Cast Ensemble in a Streaming Series, Drama	Yellowjackets	Nominated	
Hollywood Critics Association Awards	June 10, 2025	Best Actress in a Drama Series	Melanie Lynskey	Nominated	
Hollywood Critics Association Awards	June 10, 2025	Best Guest Actor in a Drama Series	Joel McHale	Nominated	
Hollywood Critics Association Awards	June 10, 2025	Best Guest Actress in a Drama Series	Hilary Swank	Won	
Hollywood Critics Association Awards	June 10, 2025	Best Directing in a Drama Series	Jennifer Morrison (for "Croak")	Nominated	
Hollywood Music in Media Awards	November 16, 2022	Best Music Supervision—Television	Jen Malone and Whitney Pilzer	Nominated	
Hollywood Music in Media Awards	November 16, 2022	Main Title Theme—TV Show/Limited Series	Craig Wedren and Anna Waronker	Nominated	
Hollywood Music in Media Awards	November 16, 2022	Original Score—TV Show/Limited Series	Craig Wedren and Anna Waronker	Won	
Hollywood Music in Media Awards	November 15, 2023	Best Music Supervision – Television	Nora Felder	Nominated	
MTV Millennial Awards	August 6, 2023	Killer Series / Movie	Yellowjackets	Nominated	
Peabody Awards	June 6–9, 2022	Entertainment	Yellowjackets	Nominated	
Primetime Creative Arts Emmy Awards	September 4, 2022	Outstanding Casting for a Drama Series	Junie Lowry Johnson, Libby Goldstein, Corinne Clark, and Jennifer Page	Nominated	
Primetime Creative Arts Emmy Awards	January 6, 2024	Outstanding Casting for a Drama Series	Junie Lowry Johnson, Libby Goldstein, Corinne Clark, and Jennifer Page	Nominated	
Primetime Emmy Awards	September 12, 2022	Outstanding Drama Series	Yellowjackets	Nominated	
Primetime Emmy Awards	September 12, 2022	Outstanding Lead Actress in a Drama Series	Melanie Lynskey	Nominated	
Primetime Emmy Awards	September 12, 2022	Outstanding Supporting Actress in a Drama Series	Christina Ricci	Nominated	
Primetime Emmy Awards	September 12, 2022	Outstanding Directing for a Drama Series	Karyn Kusama (for "Pilot")	Nominated	
Primetime Emmy Awards	September 12, 2022	Outstanding Writing for a Drama Series	Ashley Lyle and Bart Nickerson (for "Pilot")	Nominated	
Primetime Emmy Awards	September 12, 2022	Outstanding Writing for a Drama Series	Ashley Lyle, Jonathan Lisco, and Bart Nickerson (for "F Sharp")	Nominated	
Primetime Emmy Awards	January 15, 2024	Outstanding Drama Series	Yellowjackets	Nominated	
Primetime Emmy Awards	January 15, 2024	Outstanding Lead Actress in a Drama Series	Melanie Lynskey	Nominated	
Satellite Awards	March 3, 2024	Best Genre Series	Yellowjackets	Won	
Satellite Awards	March 3, 2024	Best Actress – Drama or Genre Series	Melanie Lynskey	Nominated	
Satellite Awards	March 3, 2024	Best Supporting Actress – Series, Miniseries & Limited Series, or Motion Picture Made for Television	Christina Ricci	Won	
Saturn Awards	October 25, 2022	Best Actress in a Network or Cable Television Series	Melanie Lynskey	Nominated	
Saturn Awards	October 25, 2022	Best Network or Cable Action-Thriller Television Series	Yellowjackets	Nominated	
Saturn Awards	February 4, 2024	Best Action / Adventure / Thriller Television Series	Yellowjackets	Nominated	
Set Decorators Society of America Awards	August 10, 2025	Best Achievement in Décor/Design of a One Hour Period Series	Ide Foyle, Margot Ready	Nominated	
Television Critics Association Awards	August 6, 2022	Individual Achievement in Drama	Melanie Lynskey	Nominated	
Television Critics Association Awards	August 6, 2022	Outstanding Achievement in Drama	Yellowjackets	Nominated	
Television Critics Association Awards	August 6, 2022	Outstanding New Program	Yellowjackets	Nominated	
Television Critics Association Awards	August 6, 2022	Program of the Year	Yellowjackets	Nominated	
Television Critics Association Awards	August 7, 2023	Outstanding Achievement in Drama	Yellowjackets	Nominated	
Writers Guild of America Awards	March 20, 2022	Best Drama Series	Yellowjackets (Note: Nominees: Cameron Brent Johnson, Katherine Kearns, Jonathan Lisco, Ashley Lyle, Bart Nickerson, Liz Phang, Ameni Rozsa, Sarah L. Thompson, Chantelle M. Well)	Nominated	
Writers Guild of America Awards	March 20, 2022	Best New Series	Yellowjackets	Nominated	
Writers Guild of America Awards	March 5, 2023	Best Drama Series	Yellowjackets	Nominated	

== See also ==
- Cannibalism in popular culture
