= A Beautiful Soul (film) =

- Directed by: Jeffrey W. Byrd
- Written by: Allison Elizabeth Brown; Deitrick Haddon
- Produced by: Holly Carter; Dominique Telson
- Starring: Deitrick Haddon; Robert Ri'chard; Harry Lennix; Lesley-Ann Brandt; Barry Floyd
- Music by: Deitrick Haddon
- Production companies: Relevé Entertainment; Manhaddon Entertainment; Tyscot Film + Entertainment
- Distributed by: Tyscot Music & Entertainment
- Release date: May 4, 2012
- Country: United States
- Language: English
- Box office: $54,000

A Beautiful Soul is a 2012 drama film directed by American director Jeffrey W. Byrd. The film was released May 4, 2012, and stars Deitrick Haddon, Lesley-Ann Brandt, and Harry Lennix.

== Plot ==
R&B superstar Andre Stephens (Deitrick Haddon) is on top of the world. He has success, fame, and fortune but spiritually he has lost his way. However, his "perfect" life is shattered when his entourage is brutally attacked, leaving Andre and his best friend Chris Johnson (Robert Ri'chard) clinging to life. On a spiritual journey that exists in a place that is neither on Earth nor in Heaven, Andre is given the opportunity to reevaluate his life and his faith. Andre realises he has a long way to go at church before being great.

== Cast ==
- Deitrick Haddon as Andre Stephens
- Skylan Brooks as Young Andre Stephens
- Robert Ri'chard as Chris Scott
- Lesley-Ann Brandt as Angela Berry
- Harry Lennix as Jeff Freeze
- Barry Floyd as Terrance Wilson
- Trevor Jackson as Quincy Smith
- Monica Ramon

== Reception ==
Variety gave a mostly negative review for A Beautiful Soul, remarking that the "slackness of the storytelling has the effect of subjecting the low-budget pic’s supernatural elements to charm-killing scrutiny."

=== Awards ===
- 2013: Black Reel Award for Outstanding Television Film or Mini-Series

== See also ==
- List of black films of the 2010s
