= Jeffrey W. Byrd =

American film producer

Jeffrey W. Byrd is an American film director, producer and screenwriter. Once a protégé of Spike Lee, Byrd started his film career by working on several of Lee's films including Mo' Better Blues, Malcolm X and Jungle Fever. Byrd directed more than one hundred music videos and numerous television commercials as well as feature films such as Jasper Texas, Seventeen Again and King's Ransom. His film, A Beautiful Soul, was released in 2012.

Byrd is a native of Brooklyn, New York.

== Filmography ==
Film

- Seventeen Again (2000)
- Book of Love (2002) (Also writer)
- King's Ransom (2005)
- A Beautiful Soul (2012)

Television

Year	Title	Notes
2001–04	Soul Food	5 episodes
2015	Single Ladies	2 episodes
2017	The Quad	2 episodes
2017	Switched at Birth	Episode "Occupy Truth"
2017	Rebel	2 episodes
2017–18	Runaways	2 episodes
2018–20	Dynasty	7 episodes
2018	The Originals	Episode "Don't It Just Break Your Heart"
2018	Light as a Feather	2 episodes
2018–20	Charmed	3 episodes
2019	Black Lightning	2 episodes
2020–22	Good Trouble	3 episodes
2020–22	The Flash	4 episodes
2021	Nancy Drew	2 episodes
2021–22	Our Kind of People	4 episodes
2022	Star Trek: Discovery	Episode "Rosetta" (Co-directed with Jen McGowan)
2022	Tom Swift	Episode "...And Nine Inches of Danger"
2023–25	Yellowjackets	2 episodes
2023	Star Trek: Strange New Worlds	Episode "Under the Cloak of War"
2024	The Irrational	Episode "Bad Blood"
2025–26	Watson	2 episodes
2026	The 'Burbs	2 episodes
