= Steven Krueger =

American actor (born 1989)

- Born: May 25, 1989 (age 36); Appleton, Wisconsin, United States
- Education: University of Virginia
- Occupation: Actor
- Years active: 2009–present
- Spouse: Candice King (m. 2026)
- Children: 1

Steven Krueger (born May 25, 1989) is an American actor. He is known for his roles as Coach Ben Scott on the Showtime series Yellowjackets and as Josh Rosza on The CW's The Originals.

== Life and career ==
Krueger was born in Appleton, Wisconsin, and grew up in Sarasota, Florida. He made his acting debut shortly after moving to Los Angeles in late 2009 in an episode of The CW's 90210. Over the next few years he made a number of guest star and recurring appearances in television shows like Pretty Little Liars, Workaholics, Parenthood and Two and a Half Men.

In 2013, Krueger was cast in a recurring role on The Originals, The CW's spinoff of The Vampire Diaries. His character, Josh, was the first gay character introduced on the series and was originally slated to appear in three episodes The character became a fan favorite and at the end of 2013, Krueger was named one of TV's Top Scene Stealers of the year by E! News. He appeared in a recurring role through the first four seasons, and was promoted to the main cast for its final season in 2018.

In November 2019 it was announced that Krueger was joining the cast of the Showtime pilot Yellowjackets. Krueger stayed with the series as Ben Scott, the assistant coach of the high school girls' soccer team that is stranded in the mountains after surviving a plane crash 25 years ago. Yellowjackets debuted in November 2021. Also in 2021, Krueger played a recurring role as Heath on the third season of Roswell, New Mexico.

== Personal life ==
In December 2023, Krueger confirmed he was dating American actress, Candice King. They married in a private ceremony in 2026.

In May 2026, Krueger and King welcomed their first child, a son.

== Filmography ==
Key
†	Denotes films that have not yet been released

Year	Title	Role	Notes
2009	Cold Case	Debate student #6	Episode: "Forensics"
2009	90210	Vince – Football Buddy #2	Episode: "Wild Alaskan Salmon"
2010	CSI: NY	Greg	Episode: "Point of View"
2010	The Middle	Esteban	Episode: "Foreign Exchange"
2010	No Ordinary Family	Reynolds	Episode: "No Ordinary Vigilante"
2010	Parenthood	Brody	Episode: "What's Goin' On Down There?"
2010	Pretty Little Liars	Ben Coogan	3 episodes
2011	Madison High	Pete	Unsold TV pilot
2011	Workaholics	Quaid Franklin	Episode: "Heist School"
2012–2013	Two and a Half Men	Sean	3 episodes
2013	Anger Management	Ryan Hoggett	Episode: "Charlie and Kate Start a Sex Study"
2013	Escape Plan	Gabriel	Film; uncredited
2013–2018	The Originals	Joshua Rosza	Recurring role (season 1–4), main cast (season 5)
2014	A Lesson in Romance	Brady	TV movie
2015	Hawaii Five-0	Eran Dobrian	Episode: "Kahania"
2015	Goosebumps	Davidson	Film
2016	Satanic	David	Film
2017	Ryan Hansen Solves Crimes on Television	Orson	Episode: "Joel McHale Is: Ryan Hansen"
2019	NCIS	Andrew Townsley	Episode: "Crossing The Line"
2019	Good Trouble	Eli	Episode: "Swipe Right"
2021–2022	Roswell: New Mexico	Heath Tuchman	Recurring role (season 3), guest star (season 4)
2021–present	Yellowjackets	Ben Scott	Main cast
TBA	Leaving the Light †	N/A	Director, short film, post-production
