= Sarah Desjardins =

Canadian actress (born 1994)

- Born: 16 July 1994 (age 32); Vancouver, British Columbia, Canada
- Occupation: Actress
- Years active: 2011–present

Sarah Desjardins (born 15 July 1994) is a Canadian actress. She starred in the Hub miniseries Clue (2011), the YouTube Premium series Impulse (2018–2019), the Netflix thriller The Night Agent (2023), and the third season of Showtime series Yellowjackets (2021–) after recurring for the first two seasons.

She also had recurring roles in the first season of the Syfy horror series Van Helsing (2016), the last four parts of the Netflix spy series Project MC^{2} (2016–2017), and the fourth season of The CW series Riverdale (2019–2020).

== Early life ==
Desjardins was born and raised in Vancouver, British Columbia, and she has one younger brother.

Desjardins knew she wanted to act from a young age and upon expressing interest in acting at age six, her parents got her an agent. However, realizing the work that would be involved including the expenses, travel, and line memorization, they pulled her out and encouraged her to pursue it if she was still interested when she got older. In high school, Desjardins decided to try acting again and got headshots and an agent.

== Career ==
Desjardins first role was in 2011 in Magic Beyond Words, a made-for-TV movie about the life of J.K. Rowling where Desjardins portrays a younger version of Rowling's sister Dianne. As well, Desjardins has guest starred in numerous shows such as Supernatural and Imaginary Mary. Desjardins has also starred in numerous made-for-TV movies, including the 2016 TV movie Unleashing Mr. Darcy, in which she portrayed Zara Darcy in a modern remake of Pride and Prejudice. In 2017, she starred in the Drink, Slay, Love, a Lifetime movie about teenage vampires.

In 2016, she had a recurring role in Van Helsing, a post-apocalyptic show about a woman who can turn vampires human. Desjardins finds herself playing Catherine, a character who comes in with a group of refugees and takes a younger girl, Callie, under her wing. That same year, she began a recurring role on the Netflix series Project MC2. In the series she portrays Maddy McAlister, the older sister to main character McKeyla, who, along with her friends, is recruited to join a spy organization and use STEM to save the day. Her character is a top spy agent and must figure out whether her sister has crossed over into the dark side. She describes her character as having two sides, both loving and supportive as well as cold and sinister.

In December 2016, it was announced that Desjardins would star in Impulse, a show on YouTube Premium about a 16-year-old girl named Henry who can teleport. The series is set in the same universe as the 2008 science-fiction film Jumper and is based on the 2013 book of the same name by Steven Gould. Initially auditioning for the lead role of Henrietta "Henry" Coles, Desjardins instead plays her soon-to-be stepsister, Jenna, whom she grows close to after finding out she was sexually assaulted by a classmate. Desjardins describes her character as multifaceted, being both a popular girl and Henry's confidante after her assault. As well, she describes Jenna as someone who doesn't know what she wants or who she is. The first season premiered on June 6, 2018, while the second premiered on October 16, 2019, however the series was cancelled in March 2020.

In 2019, Desjardins began a recurring role on the fourth season of The CW drama series Riverdale, as Donna Sweett, a classmate whom Jughead Jones meets at his new school, Stonewall Prep, and later becomes one of the antagonists. In 2021, Desjardins began a recurring role on the Showtime series Yellowjackets as the teenage daughter of Shauna, a woman who survived a plane crash and a lot more when she was in high school.

In July 2023, it was announced that Desjardins would join the cast of Tron: Ares alongside Jared Leto and Cameron Monaghan.

== Filmography ==
Television and film roles
Year	Title	Role	Notes
2011	Magic Beyond Words	Diane Rowling (13–15)	Television film
2011	Clue	Whitney	Miniseries (Note: Also released as the 2014 television film, Clue: A Movie Mystery Adventure.)
2012	Kiss at Pine Lake	15-year old Zoe	Television film
2013	Romeo Killer: The Chris Porco Story	Melanie Sullivan	Television film
2013	Supernatural	Young Robin	Episode: "Bad Boys"
2015	Into the Grizzly Maze	Sydnee	Film
2015	Truth and Lies	Barb	Television film
2015	Wayward Pines	Carrie	Episode: "The Truth"
2016	A.R.C.H.I.E.	Isabel	Film
2016	Unleashing Mr. Darcy	Zara Darcy	Television film
2016	I Didn't Kill My Sister	Brooke	Television film
2016	Van Helsing	Catherine	Recurring role (season 1), 5 episodes
2016–2017	Project Mc^{2}	Maddy McAlister	Recurring role (parts 3–4, 6)
2017	Cold Zone	Claire	Film
2017	Imaginary Mary	Melissa	Episode: "Alice the Mole"
2017	Drink, Slay, Love	Tara	Television film
2017	Woman of the House	Misty	Television film
2018–2019	Impulse	Jenna Hope	Main role
2019–2021	Riverdale	Donna Sweett	Recurring role (season 4); guest role (season 5)
2020	Chilling Adventures of Sabrina	Katie	Episode: "Chapter Thirty-Four: The Returned"
2021	Debris	Nicole Hegmann	Episode: "Solar Winds"
2021–present	Yellowjackets	Callie Sadecki	Recurring role (season 1–2); main role (season 3)
2022	Under the Banner of Heaven	Young Emma Smith	Miniseries
2023	The Night Agent	Maddie Redfield	Main role
2023	Float	Isabel Hamilton	Film
2024	Dead Boy Detectives	Shelby Khan	Episode: "The Case of the Two Dead Dragons"
2025	Tron: Ares	Erin	Film
2026	Law & Order: Special Victims Unit	April Deieso (Jaded_Ember)	Episode: "Vivid"
