= Yellowjackets season 3 =

Season of television series

Yellowjackets
- Season 3
- Promotional poster
- Starring: Melanie Lynskey; Tawny Cypress; Sophie Nélisse; Jasmin Savoy Brown; Sophie Thatcher; Samantha Hanratty; Steven Krueger; Warren Kole; Courtney Eaton; Liv Hewson; Kevin Alves; Sarah Desjardins; Lauren Ambrose; Simone Kessell; Christina Ricci
- No. of episodes: 10

Release
- Original network: Paramount+ with Showtime
- Original release: February 16 – April 13, 2025

Season chronology
- ← Previous; Season 2 Next → Season 4

The third season of the American thriller drama television series Yellowjackets premiered on Showtime on February 16, 2025. Series creators Ashley Lyle and Bart Nickerson serve as the showrunners for the season, alongside executive producer Jonathan Lisco. The series is centered on the teenage survivors of a 1996 plane crash in the wilderness. The narrative is set in dual timelines: the first follows the teens in the 1990s as they must learn to survive in the wild after the crash, while the second takes place 25 years later and focuses on the survivors' attempts to readjust after rescue and confront the truth about what they did to survive.

The ensemble cast includes Melanie Lynskey, Tawny Cypress, Sophie Nélisse, Jasmin Savoy Brown, Sophie Thatcher, Samantha Hanratty, Steven Krueger, Warren Kole, and Christina Ricci, who all return from the previous season. Sarah Desjardins was promoted to the main cast after featuring in a recurring role in the previous seasons. Hilary Swank and Joel McHale joined the cast in guest starring roles.

In December 2022, ahead of Yellowjackets' second season, Showtime renewed the series for a third season. Season three was originally expected to premiere sometime in 2024; however, production was delayed due to the WGA and SAG strikes of 2023. Season three consists of ten episodes. Reviews were generally positive, though critics were unsure about the direction of the series and criticized the present-day storyline.

== Cast ==
=== Main ===
- Melanie Lynskey as Shauna Sadecki, née Shipman
  - Sophie Nélisse as teen Shauna
- Tawny Cypress as Taissa Turner
  - Jasmin Savoy Brown as teen Taissa
- Christina Ricci as Misty Quigley
  - Samantha Hanratty as teen Misty
- Sophie Thatcher as Natalie Scatorccio
- Steven Krueger as Ben Scott
- Warren Kole as Jeff Sadecki
- Simone Kessell as Lottie Matthews
  - Courtney Eaton as teen Lottie
- Lauren Ambrose as Vanessa "Van" Palmer
  - Liv Hewson as teen Van
- Kevin Alves as teen Travis Martinez
- Sarah Desjardins as Callie Sadecki

=== Special guest ===
- Hilary Swank as Melissa Kaplan

=== Recurring ===
- Ella Purnell as Jackie Taylor
- Elijah Wood as Walter Tattersall
- Alexa Barajas as Mari Ibarra
- Nia Sondaya as Akilah
- Jenna Burgess as teen Melissa
- Ashley Sutton as Hannah Sophia Finch
- Vanessa Prasad as Gen
- Anisa Harris as Robin
- Silvana Estifanos as Britt

=== Guest ===
- Joel McHale as Kodiak
- Nicole Maines as Lisa
- Rukiya Bernard as Simone Abara
- Aiden Stoxx as Sammy Abara-Turner

== Episodes ==
No. overall	No. in season	Title	Directed by	Written by	Original release date (Note: Every episode was also available to stream two days earlier on the Paramount+ with Showtime plan.)	U.S. viewers (millions)
20	1	"It Girl"	Bart Nickerson	Jonathan Lisco & Ashley Lyle & Bart Nickerson	February 16, 2025	0.092
It is the late days of spring, and the Yellowjackets are living comfortably, thanks to Natalie's leadership. While under the influence of hallucinogens, Travis hears the wilderness screaming, and Lottie encourages him to connect with it. Shauna is still full of resentment towards her teammates and begins a feud with Mari, with a fight at dinner pushing Mari to leave the group. Coach Ben wanders the woods alone. He finds a survival kit and sets up game traps; one of his pit traps captures Mari. In the present, the Yellowjackets pay their respects to Natalie, with Misty grieving the loss the hardest; she gets drunk and belligerent at a bar and is rescued by Walter. Callie is suspended from school for attacking classmates with a bag of animal guts after they insult Shauna. Later, a cryptic envelope containing a cassette tape arrives for Shauna, but Callie intercepts it. Taissa, now separated from Simone and Sammy, takes care of Van in her ailing health. The two go out to a fancy dinner but dine and dash, resulting in the waiter suffering a heart attack while in pursuit.
21	2	"Dislocation"	Bille Woodruff	Rich Monahan & Ameni Rozsa	February 16, 2025	0.071
The Yellowjackets go looking for Mari. Misty suspects that Natalie knows where Ben is hiding and tells Shauna her suspicions. Lottie pushes Travis to take more mushrooms to connect with the wilderness, which results in him attacking her. Ben rescues Mari from his pit, but knowing the team thinks he burned down the cabin, refuses to let her leave. He takes Mari to his cave, where she catches him seemingly talking to somebody else. Shauna moves the grave of her stillborn son to a more private location, but JV team member Melissa finds it. When Shauna threatens Melissa, Melissa kisses her in response. Shauna kisses her back. In the present, Taissa returns to the restaurant to settle the unpaid bill but flees when she discovers that she inadvertently killed the waiter. Lottie arrives unannounced at Shauna and Jeff's house, and Callie convinces them to let her stay. Shauna calls Misty to "babysit" while she and Jeff take a meeting with potential furniture store clients. Callie drugs Misty and bonds with Lottie. Walter warns Misty that they are not truly her friends and only call her when convenient, but Misty rebukes him. While meeting with the potential clients, Shauna is followed into the bathroom, where she is left a cell phone with no caller ID. Later, she nervously calls the restaurant to find out who retrieved the phone.
22	3	"Them's the Brakes"	Jonathan Lisco	Jonathan Lisco & Ashley Lyle & Bart Nickerson	February 23, 2025	0.079
After a scuffle and a heart to heart, Ben lets Mari go. She finds her way back to camp and quickly reveals Ben's location. She leads most of the team to the tunnel into his cave, and they split up to find him. Shauna, Van, and Akilah team up, but are soon haunted by detailed visions – Van is trapped in a fiery cabin, Akilah is swallowed up by the earth, and Shauna is unable to swim to shore to greet her son. Their visions all converge into one, in a classroom with Lottie and Jackie. They're saved by Ben, who reveals that the cave has some kind of noxious gas. Natalie and Taissa then find them and tell Ben he has to come with them. In the present, Van learns that her cancer has stopped metastasizing. Taissa suggests the waiter's death saved Van's life. Later, Taissa spots The Man With No Eyes in a vintage ice cream store commercial. She and Van drive to the abandoned store and break in. Callie meets up with Lottie, who encourages her to shoplift. Misty invites Shauna out for coffee to explain her side of the previous night. In the car, Shauna finds that her brakes have been tampered with and immediately blames Misty, who denies it and storms off, denouncing Shauna as a friend. Shauna comes home to find Lottie has given Jackie's heart necklace to Callie. Furious, Shauna orders Lottie to leave.
23	4	"12 Angry Girls and 1 Drunk Travis"	Jennifer Morrison	Julia Bicknell & Terry Wesley	March 2, 2025	0.058
The team holds a trial to determine Ben's guilt, with Natalie as judge, Taissa as the prosecutor, and Misty as the defense. Shauna blames Ben for not being there for her birth, while Lottie expresses reasonable doubt. Shauna tells Tai that Nat knew Ben was alive. When questioned, Nat admits that she knew but had trusted Ben to leave them in peace. Ben defends himself and apologizes to Shauna and the team for abandoning them when they needed him. When the team struggles to meet a two-thirds majority, Shauna strong-arms everyone into voting against Ben. The team ultimately finds Ben guilty of burning down the cabin. In the present, Shauna learns that her brakes were never cut and it was simply a faulty brake booster. Jeff feels that they are haunted by bad karma, and signs them up for volunteer work at the residential home where Misty works. Shauna is locked in the freezer and haunted by Jackie. Taissa calls Lottie and asks her to clarify what she meant during the night that Natalie died, but Lottie dodges the question. Tai and Van test the wilderness by planting a Queen of Hearts card for a random passerby to choose, but they back out before they can hurt him. While scrolling through her Citizen Detective forum, Misty finds a photo of Lottie dead at the bottom of a flight of stairs.
24	5	"Did Tai Do That?"	Jeffrey W. Byrd	Sarah L. Thompson & Elise Brown	March 9, 2025	0.058
The team decides to execute Ben firing squad style, so they draw cards to pick the gunman, and Taissa draws the King of Hearts. Van encourages Tai to connect with "other Tai" to make it easier. Lottie and Travis take Akilah back to the cave to connect with the wilderness, and she hallucinates Ben as a bridge home. Lottie rescues Ben from the firing squad, but Melissa, with Shauna's encouragement, cuts his Achilles tendon to prevent him from running away. In the present, Misty tells the other women of Lottie's death and begins a Citizen Detective investigation. Shauna is cornered by Walter and recruited into investigating Lottie's death with him. The three of them infiltrate Lottie's father's home. He is dealing with dementia and imagines Shauna as Lottie, and she has an emotional discussion with him. Tai and Van have an awkward reunion with Simone and Sammy, but Sammy backs away from Tai. Tai suggests to Van that they pursue "a change of scenery."
25	6	"Thanksgiving (Canada)"	Pete Chatmon	Libby Hill & Emily St. James	March 16, 2025	N/A
Ben, suffering from his wound and tired of captivity, repeatedly asks Natalie to kill him when she brings him food. When she refuses, he goes on a hunger strike, prompting the rest of the team to restrain and force-feed him. Unable to watch him suffer further, Natalie sneaks into his pen one night and euthanizes him with her knife. A devastated Misty demands Natalie be held to account, and the rest of the team, outraged by Natalie's choice, agrees. Shauna is named their new leader, and makes Natalie butcher Ben's body for meat so that they can "honor" him with a feast. That night, while eating, they hear the wilderness screaming again. They respond by singing, and are interrupted by the arrival of three adult strangers, who react with horror upon seeing Ben's severed head resting on a tree stump. In the present, Callie gives Shauna the cassette tape after learning of Lottie's death. Shauna, convinced her family may be targeted next, moves them to a hotel. Unable to play the tape, she contacts Van and Taissa, who bring a DAT player to the hotel. The three are unnerved by the contents of the tape, believing it to be a threat. Callie plants a phone in Shauna's bag in an attempt to eavesdrop on the recording, but Shauna finds it and deletes it. However, Callie retrieves it from the phone's "Recently Deleted" folder. Meanwhile, Misty continues her investigation, obtaining and analyzing a DNA sample from the crime scene. With nothing to compare the analysis to, she reluctantly asks Walter for help. She also tracks down Lisa, who reveals that Lottie gave her $50,000 cash and met with Taissa the day she died.
26	7	"Croak"	Jennifer Morrison	Alisha Brophy & Ameni Rozsa	March 23, 2025	0.068
The strangers are revealed to be two frog scientists, Edwin and Hannah, and their guide, Kodiak. Lottie quickly kills Edwin with an axe, claiming that the wilderness does not want them there. Hannah and Kodiak run, and the team pursues them. Hannah hides behind a log and records a message to her child into her DAT recorder. Taissa and Van find the scientists' tent, but are dismayed to see that their satellite phone is broken. Travis and Akilah save Kodiak from falling off the cliffside. Natalie and Shauna find Hannah, and the team takes her back to their camp. In the present, Misty questions Taissa about her having been with Lottie the night she died. Shauna listens to the tape and hears Hannah's message; she concludes that Hannah's daughter is the one harassing her and decides to confront her. Walter calls Misty and tells her the DNA found under Lottie's fingernails is a match for Shauna. Van begins to cough up blood, and she is quickly brought to the hospital, where she has visions of her teenage self and of "other Tai". Callie reveals to Jeff that she knows about the frog scientists and wonders if Shauna is truly a bad person. That night, Shauna drives to a suburban home and patiently waits in her car with a leather-bound hunting knife.
27	8	"A Normal, Boring Life"	Anya Adams	Julia Bicknell	March 30, 2025	0.094
The girls interrogate Hannah, who recognizes the girls from the plane crash news. She reveals that there was a search party, but they eventually gave up, disappointing them. Travis reveals to Akilah that he lied about his visions and that she is not "a seer", disappointing her. Hannah and Kodiak claim they can get the girls to a rescue point; Lottie claims "it" does not want them back there. Natalie rounds the team up to go, but Lottie, Taissa, and Shauna announce they are staying, and Shauna forbids the group from leaving. In the present, Taissa and Misty learn that Van might need to enter hospice. To appease "it", Tai attempts to suffocate a patient on his death bed, but does not follow through before he naturally dies. Callie and Jeff conclude that they are not actually in danger. Jeff reencounters the furniture clients and quickly blames their prior bad meeting on Shauna's behavior. Meanwhile, Shauna breaks into the house and encounters adult Melissa, who is living incognito and is married to Hannah's daughter. Melissa denies any wrongdoing and mocks Shauna for living a lie. Shauna attacks Melissa and bites a chunk out of her arm, forcing her to eat it while threatening to reveal her identity to her family.
28	9	"How the Story Ends"	Ben Semanoff	Sarah L. Thompson	April 6, 2025	0.095
Due to Shauna's threats, the team is forced to stay at the campsite longer. Travis rigs the pit with spikes and lures Lottie over to it, but she manages not to spring it. Melissa rebukes Shauna's attitude in front of everyone. Shauna threatens Melissa with the rifle, but Melissa challenges her further; Shauna shoots, grazing the side of Melissa's jacket. Natalie conspires with some of the team to free Hannah and Kodiak, but when they're caught by Shauna, Hannah kills Kodiak and offers to stay with the team. Natalie cries in despair as the first snowfall arrives. Misty recovers the broken emergency locator beacon and shows a shocked Natalie that she can get them home. In the present, Van hallucinates a conversation with her teen self. She awakes in the hospital and leaves with Taissa and Misty. Melissa manages to escape Shauna, but is picked up along the side of the road by Van, Tai, and Misty, and brought back to the house. Melissa denies killing Lottie, and Misty admits to locking Shauna in the freezer. Misty leaves and meets up with Walter; she steals his copy of Lottie's phone and discovers something in his camera roll. Melissa discreetly shuts the flue and poisons the house with carbon monoxide. Van rescues Tai and Shauna and attacks Melissa with a knife, but cannot bring herself to kill her; Melissa stabs Van in the chest. Van finds herself in the plane with her younger self, explaining that despite her death, this is not the end.
29	10	"Full Circle"	Bart Nickerson	Ameni Rozsa	April 13, 2025	0.125
Natalie is furious with Misty for destroying the emergency transponder, but agrees to not tell the team if Misty helps her. The livestock has mysteriously died, leading the team to declare a new hunt. Taissa and Van try to rig the card selection so Hannah is selected, but Shauna catches on and manipulates it so that Mari is chosen. Mari is chased, but the hunt is largely a distraction to get Natalie the satellite phone. Mari springs the covered spike pit trap and is impaled. (Note: "Pit Girl" in the opening sequence in "Pilot".) After the feast, Shauna realizes Natalie is missing; Natalie has taken the satellite phone to the top of a cliff. A male voice on the other end of the phone responds. In the present, Taissa buries Van's body, but not before carving out her heart and eating it. Misty interrogates Callie, who admits to killing Lottie; Callie had pushed Lottie down the stairs in a moment of rage. Callie reveals this to Jeff, and they both flee the house and disconnect from Shauna. Taissa and Misty meet to discuss what to do about Shauna next. Shauna finds the house empty and the discarded note that had accompanied the DAT tape. She rips it up and journals about her desire to claim her power back.

== Production ==
=== Development ===
Yellowjackets was renewed by Showtime for a third season on December 15, 2022, ahead of the release of season two. It was originally anticipated to premiere sometime in 2024. The writers' room was one day into work on the new season when the WGA went on strike, delaying production.

On October 31, 2024, Vanity Fair released an exclusive first look which confirmed an "early 2025" release for season three. The show's creators said the new season would resolve many outstanding mysteries, with Ashley Lyle stating that it will "realize much of the vision for the show that she and her co-creator, Bart Nickerson, developed at the very outset", and that there will be at least "two very big questions with very clear answers." She also noted that this season would see "an overlapping of the past and present."

In an interview with The Hollywood Reporter, the show's creators stated that the death of adult Natalie would drive season three. They also stated that Juliette Lewis will not appear in the third season, as it did not make sense to them, but that they are open to the possibility of her appearing in some form or another, such as flashbacks, in the future. They also stated that while the season is in some ways campier and more fun, it is ultimately not lighter in tone. Christina Ricci said the season has a "really high body count."

On November 19, 2024, a premiere date was scheduled for February 16, 2025. The bonus episode that was planned for release between seasons two and three remained unaired. The episode was widely believed to focus on the origin of the abandoned cabin that was introduced in season one. In December 2024, Lyle stated, "The truth is that there is a bonus episode but we may need to wait a bit longer for it." In November 2026, Nickerson confirmed that the episode will not air, stating that when making the series "lots of paths considered and things like that were explored" but "the final version of the show is what it was supposed to be" and the fourth season is "the final installment of a complete story".

On May 20, 2025, Showtime renewed Yellowjackets for a fourth season. In October, the show's creators confirmed the fourth season would be the series' final one.

=== Casting ===
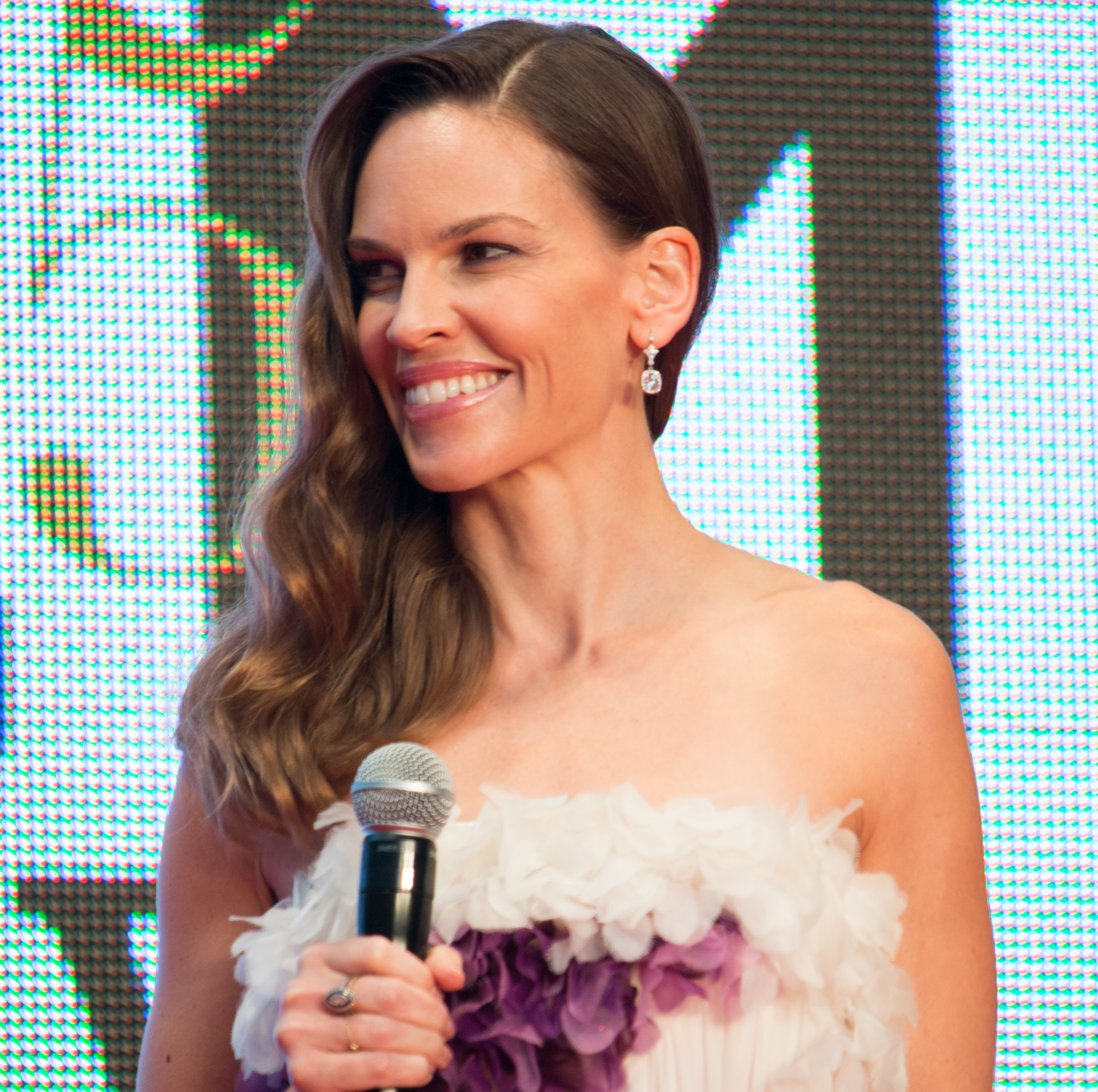
Hilary Swank joined the cast in a recurring guest role.

On November 21, 2024, it was reported that Sarah Desjardins, who portrayed Shauna Sadecki's daughter Callie in the first and second seasons of Yellowjackets in a recurring role, was promoted to the regular cast. In addition, it was announced that two teen characters would be played by new actresses, Anisa Harris and Silvana Estifanos. In August 2024, Joel McHale was announced to be joining the cast in a guest starring role. The following month, Hilary Swank joined the cast as another guest star. In January 2025, it was reported that Ashley Sutton was cast in an unknown recurring role, appearing in four out of ten episodes.

=== Filming ===
Filming began in the Vancouver area on May 14, 2024. After primarily filming on a soundstage for season two, the production returned to filming outdoors. Showrunners Bart Nickerson and Jonathan Lisco made their directorial debuts this season, with Nickerson directing "It Girl" and Lisco helming "Them's the Brakes."

== Release ==
A first look video for the new season was released on the official Yellowjackets channel on YouTube on December 7, 2024. The full trailer was released on January 22, 2025.

On February 10, 2025, Entertainment Weekly released a set of exclusive photos which depicted, among other things, Shauna biting Mari's arm, with the promise of additional exclusives each day of the week.

The season premiered on Showtime with two episodes on February 16, 2025. As with the previous season, new episodes were made available two days prior to the linear TV date for Paramount+ with Showtime subscribers.

== Reception ==
=== Audience viewership ===
The third season became the show's most-watched season yet. In the weekend of its release, the season premiere gained over two million viewers in its opening weekend, mostly from streaming. The season finale drew three million cross-platform viewers in its first seven days, making it the series' highest-viewed season finale yet.

=== Critical response ===
On review aggregator Rotten Tomatoes, the season holds an approval rating of 84% based on 134 reviews. The website's critical consensus reads, "Still at its very best when lost in the wilderness, Yellowjackets' third season is inescapably uneven but carried along effortlessly by its stronger elements." Metacritic, which uses a weighted average, assigned the season a score of 64 out of 100 based on 25 reviews, indicating "generally favorable" reviews.

Shirley Li of The Atlantic wrote, Yellowjackets "is now built for—and deliberately toying with—the die-hard viewer who's watching the show for its revelations, as silly as they may be." She added, "The show doesn't comment on modern-day politics or today's headlines, but it captures the feeling of being inundated with surreal news. The result is a season that's ludicrous in plot yet freshly unsettling in its portrayal of how people can become resigned to their fate." In The Hollywood Reporter, Angie Han wrote, "Now in its third go-round, the drama still wobbles in pursuit of an ideal balance. But as ever, it's guided by character dynamics juicy enough, and performances excellent enough, to keep you watching."

Salon.com's Melanie McFarland wrote that the absence of Juliette Lewis was akin to "breaking up the actor equivalent of a '90s supergroup", and criticized the writing of adult Taissa, Van, and Lottie's character arcs. Particular praise was given to the performances of Lynskey, Ricci, Nélisse, Thatcher, Hanratty, and Krueger. Elizabeth Alsop of the Los Angeles Review of Books, however, disagreed with "the decision to dial Shauna's psychotic behavior in both timelines up to 11", feeling that an overt villain arc "sends the show careening toward melodrama, turning what was a spiky, original look at group survival dynamics into something more like a morality play".

The present-day timeline received criticisms for its unsteady narrative and tonal dissonance with its 1990s counterpart. In Vulture, Roxana Hadadi noted while it is admirable to give the core adult characters separate plot arcs, "Yellowjackets forgets that a major appeal of this ensemble is what its members get up to together." She added "season three feels like Yellowjackets wiping the board of its adult story lines rather than working them out of the corners they've been written into". Hadadi said the show is at its best when it focuses on "what makes these girls and women tick, maneuvering the characters to reflect the thin line between civility and the feral...But the impenetrability of where this story is going, and the dwindling numbers of who will survive by the end of it, are diminishing shadows that glow."

Reviews were critical of the ongoing mystery storylines and withholding of answers, particularly the question of whether the supernatural force that the survivors face in the wilderness is an actual entity or a symptom of psychological trauma. Some critics said that the show had fallen into the same traps as Lost, another plane crash drama with mystery box elements. In Vanity Fair, Joshua Rivera said the series' "emphasis on mystery and posing questions it can't answer has historically been why its present-day story lacks the dynamism of the '90s plot; if any of the present-day cast is too outspoken about what they experienced, well, that kills the tension of the flashbacks". Rivera concluded, "Depending on what brings you to Yellowjackets, this new season will either bring disappointment or seem like a turn in the right direction…If the series continues to shed its puzzle-box baggage...there remains plenty of room for the series to settle into a sharp, mean survival story, complemented by biting satirical dramedy. That would be more than enough for Yellowjackets to make it through the woods."

=== Accolades ===
At the 5th Astra TV Awards, Yellowjackets received five nominations, including for Best Cast Ensemble in a Streaming Drama Series, and Best Directing in a Drama Series for Jennifer Morrison, who directed the episode "Croak". Hilary Swank won for Best Guest Actress in a Drama Series.
