= Croak (Yellowjackets) =

- Yellowjackets episode
- Episode no.: Season 3 Episode 7
- Directed by: Jennifer Morrison
- Written by: Alisha Brophy; Ameni Rosza
- Cinematography by: Shasta Spahn
- Editing by: Jeff Israel
- Original air date: March 23, 2025
- Running time: 54 minutes

Guest appearances
- Alexa Barajas as Mari; Nia Sondaya as Akilah; Joel McHale as Kodiak; Nelson Franklin as Edwin; Jenna Burgess as Teen Melissa; Ashley Sutton as Hannah; Elijah Wood as Walter Tattersall (uncredited)

Episode chronology
| ← Previous "Thanksgiving (Canada)" | Next → "A Normal, Boring Life" |

"Croak" is the seventh episode of the third season of the American thriller drama television series Yellowjackets. It is the 26th overall episode of the series and was written by Alisha Brophy and executive producer Ameni Rozsa, and directed by Jennifer Morrison. It aired on Showtime on March 23, 2025, but it was available to stream two days earlier on Paramount+ with Showtime.

The series follows a New Jersey high school girls' soccer team that travels to Seattle for a national tournament in 1996. While flying over Canada, their plane crashes deep in the wilderness, and the surviving team members are left stranded for nineteen months. The series chronicles their attempts to stay alive as some of the team members are driven to cannibalism. It also focuses on the lives of the survivors 25 years later in 2021, as the events of their ordeal continue to affect them many years after their rescue. In the episode, Shauna realizes who might be behind the DAT tape, and goes on a road trip with Misty, Taissa and Van. Flashbacks depict a group encountering the Yellowjackets in the woods, with deadly consequences.

According to Nielsen Media Research, the episode was seen by an estimated 0.068 million household viewers and gained a 0.005 ratings share among adults aged 18–49. The episode received generally positive reviews from critics, who praised the flashback sequences and tension, but mixed reviews for the present-day storyline.

== Plot ==
=== Flashbacks ===
Two scientists, Edwin (Nelson Franklin) and Hannah Finch (Ashley Sutton), are researching frogs in the forest with their guide, Kodiak (Joel McHale). Kodiak exhibits an expert knowledge of the area and suggests they should try to eat hunted animals, but Edwin prefers to use his own food, despite being warned that it could run out. Tensions grow between Kodiak and Edwin, as the latter feels intimidated by his presence. One night, they smell a barbecue nearby and Edwin decides to investigate.

They find the Yellowjackets' camp, and Edwin is horrified to find Ben's head on a tree stump. Suddenly, Lottie (Courtney Eaton) plunges an axe into Edwin's head, killing him, stating that "It" does not want them there. Kodiak and Hannah flee into the woods, with Kodiak using his crossbow to shoot Melissa (Jenna Burgess), and Shauna (Sophie Nélisse) demands that Mari (Alexa Barajas) take care of Melissa. Hannah hides behind a tree log and records a message for her daughter, on a DAT tape, professing her love. Taissa (Jasmin Savoy Brown) and Van (Liv Hewson) find the scientists' tent, but are dismayed to see that their remote transmitter is broken.

Hannah surrenders and is taken by Shauna, who holds her at knife point. She offers to help them save Melissa as she knows where a first aid kit is located. Travis (Kevin Alves) and Akilah (Nia Sondaya) trick Kodiak into reaching a cliff but decide to save him from falling. By the early morning, Mari and Gen refuse to let Lottie get involved in saving Melissa, and are forced to break the arrow and plunge it through. The rest of the team arrives, with Hannah introducing herself.

=== Present day ===
Shauna (Melanie Lynskey) listens to the DAT tape, revealing that the recording includes part of Edwin's death. She searches Hannah on the Internet, finding her obituary. She informs Jeff (Warren Kole) that she needs to leave, and asks him to watch over Callie (Sarah Desjardins).

Shauna tells Taissa (Tawny Cypress), Van (Lauren Ambrose) and Misty (Christina Ricci) that the recording belonged to Hannah, deducing that her daughter is the one who sent the envelope with the tape. She has tracked her down to Richmond, Virginia, and they decide to accompany her. During the drive, Misty is called by Walter (Elijah Wood), who reveals that the DNA found under Lottie's fingernails is a match for Shauna's, suggesting Shauna might be Lottie's killer. Misty texts Taissa and Van about her suspicions, and when Shauna asks what is happening, Van coughs blood.

Callie reveals to Jeff that she knows about the frog scientists and wonders if Shauna is truly a bad person. Van is taken to a hospital, with Taissa allowed to stay with her. In her bed, Van has visions of her teenage self and of "other Tai". In the waiting room, Misty accuses Shauna of killing Lottie from the evidence Walter found. Upset, Shauna leaves in her car, abandoning them. Shauna arrives at a suburban house in Richmond, waiting in her car with a knife.

== Development ==
=== Production ===
The episode was written by Alisha Brophy and executive producer Ameni Rozsa, and directed by Jennifer Morrison. This marked Brophy's first writing credit, Rozsa's seventh writing credit, and Morrison's second directing credit. Morrison said that after directing "12 Angry Girls and 1 Drunk Travis", she was asked to return to direct the seventh episode.

=== Casting ===
In August 2024, it was confirmed that Joel McHale would guest star in the series. McHale met series co-creator Ashley Lyle at a Built to Spill concert at the Troubadour in 2024, and she suggested taking the role. McHale accepted after arranging his schedule for his sitcom Animal Control. Describing his role, he said, "I didn't realize that it was helping to evolve the show, and how Ashley would go on a journey with her character that is transformative to the group. I didn't really understand the scope. I thought more like I was a catalyst to get them [rescued]."

=== Filming ===
Jennifer Morrison described the decision to let the episode open with new characters before catching up with the Yellowjackets team, "It was important to make that opening feel like the opening of a horror film, where you get to meet all these people and get to know them and care about them, even though you have an ominous feeling that something terrible will probably happen. I wanted to make sure they all got a moment to really show a sense of who they were, but also a sense of the fractures that were within the group already, so that, by the time they encounter the girls in the wilderness, we're aware of those vulnerabilities."

== Reception ==
=== Viewers ===
The episode was watched by 0.068 million viewers, earning a 0.005 in the 18-49 rating demographics on the Nielsen ratings scale. This means that 0.005 percent of all households with televisions watched the episode.

=== Critical reviews ===
"Croak" received generally positive reviews from critics. The review aggregator website Rotten Tomatoes reported a 100% approval rating for the episode, based on 8 reviews with a 7.8/10 average rating.

Jen Lennon of The A.V. Club gave the episode a "B–" and wrote, "“Croak” wastes no time filling in the backstories of McHale and the two strangers who stumbled upon the Yellowjackets' camp last week in a competent episode that effectively advances the series' various plots. And after “Thanksgiving (Canada)” gave us one of the show's best episodes to date, a largely unflashy entry that adds necessary context without giving too much away is a perfectly acceptable follow-up."

Erin Qualey of Vulture gave the episode a 4 star rating out of 5 and wrote, "This sound, we're meant to understand, is the unholy sound that the Yellowjackets have been hearing in the woods. Sometimes, the things we perceive as threats or horrors are just a bunch of animals in the wilderness, trying to get their evolution on; every organism is simply trying to survive." Samantha Graves of Collider wrote, "The latter half of Season 3 is already making up for the slower start, and from here on out, it's just a race to the finish line as we await answers and learn how the mystery will unravel further."

Esther Zuckerman of The New York Times wrote, "If the end of Episode 6 was a thrilling tease, Episode 7 is the confirmation that Yellowjackets is moving its plot forward both in the past and the present." Melody McCune of Telltale TV gave the episode a 4 star rating out of 5 and wrote, "Ever heard of the Arctic Banshee Frog? Apparently, they get pretty loud during mating season. If there's one thing Yellowjackets does well, it makes us question whether what we're seeing/hearing is real or not."
