= Full Circle (Yellowjackets) =

- Yellowjackets episode
- Episode no.: Season 3 Episode 10
- Directed by: Bart Nickerson
- Written by: Ameni Rozsa
- Cinematography by: Michael Wale
- Editing by: Jeff Israel
- Original air date: April 13, 2025
- Running time: 60 minutes

Guest appearances
- Simone Kessell as Lottie Matthews; Alexa Barajas as Mari; Nia Sondaya as Akilah; Jenna Burgess as Teen Melissa; Ashley Sutton as Hannah; Elijah Wood as Walter Tattersall

Episode chronology
| ← Previous "How the Story Ends" | Next → "Hivemind" |

"Full Circle" is the tenth episode and season finale of the third season of the American thriller drama television series Yellowjackets. It is the 29th overall episode of the series and was written by executive producer Ameni Rozsa, and directed by series co-creator Bart Nickerson. It aired on Showtime on April 13, 2025, but it was available to stream two days earlier on Paramount+ with Showtime.

The series follows a New Jersey high school girls' soccer team that travels to Seattle for a national tournament in 1996. While flying over Canada, their plane crashes deep in the wilderness, and the surviving team members are left stranded for nineteen months. The series chronicles their attempts to stay alive as some of the team members are driven to cannibalism. It also focuses on the lives of the survivors 25 years later in 2021, as the events of their ordeal continue to affect them many years after their rescue. In the episode, Misty confronts Callie for a past incident, while Taissa decides to take action against Shauna. Flashbacks depict the beginning of a new winter for the team, and their attempt to appease the wilderness.

== Plot ==
=== Flashbacks ===
Upon finding that Misty (Samantha Hanratty) was responsible for the broken emergency locator beacon, Natalie (Sophie Thatcher) angrily punches her. Despite her anger, Natalie decides not to report what she's learned to the team.

The team has tried surviving a new winter, with Hannah (Ashley Sutton) now working alongside Shauna (Sophie Nélisse). After finding that their livestock have died, the team concludes that the wilderness needs another sacrifice. They once again draw cards to decide, with Taissa (Jasmin Savoy Brown) and Van (Liv Hewson) conspiring to have Hannah selected. However, Shauna is aware of them and forces them to move the order, and Mari (Alexa Barajas) is selected. She is given a 30-second head start to run, while the rest of the team prepares to hunt her. During the hunt, Shauna is attacked by Melissa (Jenna Burgess), who tries to choke her, but is unable to do so. Natalie is approached by Hannah, who explains that she is simply pretending to be on Shauna's side and helps Natalie retrieve and fix the satellite phone. Akilah (Nia Sondaya) confronts Lottie (Courtney Eaton), revealing Akilah killed the animals to force the hunt.

Mari removes some of her clothing during the run and escapes into the outskirts, but ends up falling in the spike pit, dying. (Note: Mari is revealed to be the "Pit Girl" who dies in the opening sequence in "Pilot".) As the group returns, Shauna confronts Natalie again, only to find that it was Hannah in disguise. Natalie is seen reaching the top of a snowy cliff, trying to get the satellite phone to work. As she uses it to ask for help, she hears a male voice saying "I can hear you."

=== Present day ===
After leaving Melissa (Hilary Swank)'s house, Shauna (Melanie Lynskey) drives Taissa (Tawny Cypress) to the woods. Taissa buries Van (Lauren Ambrose)'s body, refusing to let Shauna touch her. Before burying Van, Taissa cuts out Van's heart and eats it.

Misty confronts Callie (Sarah Desjardins) at school, having concluded that she was the one who killed Lottie (Simone Kessell). Callie explains that Lottie stole the DAT tape and took it back to the apartment complex where she was staying with her father. Callie confronts Lottie, who has set up candles in a flight of stairs, believing that this is what "it" wants. Lottie reveals that the girls committed cannibalism and hunted each other, believing that "it" has possessed Shauna and that she might grow resentful of Callie's life. In a rage, Callie pushes her down the stairs, accidentally killing her. Misty understands Callie's predicament, and Callie confesses this to Jeff (Warren Kole). While shocked, he consoles her, telling her she is a good person. When Shauna returns home, she finds Jeff and Callie gone, with Callie’s phone disconnected.

Shauna visits Misty (Christina Ricci) to demand answers about Callie and Jeff's location, but Misty refuses to divulge it. While Misty will not report anything to the police, she wants nothing to do with Shauna anymore. Later, Taissa and Misty meet at a diner to discuss Shauna's situation. Taissa blames Shauna for everything wrong in their lives and decides to take action, and Misty agrees to help. Unbeknownst to Taissa and Misty, they are being spied on by Walter (Elijah Wood). Back home, Jeff texts Shauna to not contact them for a while. While drinking alone, Shauna finds the note that Melissa slipped in the DAT tape envelope, which Callie dropped unknowingly under the refrigerator. The note confirms Melissa's statements about forgiving herself, but Shauna decides to rip it up and shred it in the garbage disposal. Shauna writes in her journal that she enjoyed her time in the wilderness where she was a warrior and a queen.

== Development ==
=== Production ===
The episode was written by executive producer Ameni Rozsa, and directed by series co-creator Bart Nickerson. This marked Rozsa's eighth writing credit, and Nickerson's second directing credit.

=== Writing ===
Alexa Barajas said that when she was cast, she got a chance to watch the pilot episode and immediately deduced that the "Pit Girl" would be Mari. The crew informed her that Mari was the "Pit Girl" while filming the third season. She said, "I saw this girl running in the woods, and I said, ‘I think I look a whole lot like her.’ So, I had a feeling that that this was where it was gonna all end up, and I am so excited that we finally got to do it." Series co-creator Ashley Lyle explained, "the fact that we didn't want it to be Mari is what let us know that was exactly the right decision, and that we had, at least for ourselves, done the job well. There was no looking back at a certain point."

Lyle described Shauna's development, "to our minds, this has been a very long, slow build towards Shauna as everything the Antler Queen represents, which is the most feral, the most animalistic, the most excited by that power that comes with being the leader and being out in the wilderness." Sophie Nélisse explained, "She's not hated but so feared in the adult storyline that I assumed there would be a turning point in the show. And it's been really fun because it's such a different side to her; it's a completely different arc." Melanie Lynskey added, "It almost felt like a relief to me because she's been repressing. To have been playing for almost three full seasons somebody who's trying to repress the most powerful part of themselves, it felt exciting and like a relief."

=== Music ===
For the final scene, the series used "Livin' on the Edge" by Aerosmith. Originally, the song would be used in the pilot episode, but the cost of licensing were too high back then. Nickerson and Lyle hoped to eventually use it, while executive producer Jonathan Lisco hoped to include more Aerosmith songs as he was a big fan of the band. Nickerson said, "So to finish on a big, high-production-value bombastic song just could not have been more fun for the three of us."

== Reception ==
=== Critical reviews ===
"Full Circle" received mixed-to-positive reviews. The review aggregator website Rotten Tomatoes reported a 71% approval rating for the episode, based on seven reviews with a 6.6/10 average rating.

Jen Lennon of The A.V. Club gave the episode a "C–" and wrote, "The major failure of “Full Circle” isn't that the plot twists are unbelievable or that the answers it provides are unsatisfying. It's that the audience doesn't buy the twists and the answers don't feel satisfying because the show hasn't done the work of building out the characters' internal lives. Their actions feel arbitrary, like they're coming out of nowhere. And three full seasons in, we should have a much better understanding of who these characters are and what they want by now."

Erin Qualey of Vulture gave the episode a four-star rating out of five and wrote, "It should not have taken three full seasons to get to this point. But here we are, and thankfully, the conclusion of the season has much to recommend the show for a fourth (and hopefully final) outing."

Samantha Graves of Collider wrote, "It's an explosive finale, one that rivals its predecessors, complete with spine-tingling needle drops and acting performances that will be all the buzz." Erik Kain of Forbes wrote, "There were moments throughout this episode and this season that I genuinely enjoyed, but this should have been such a big, earth-shattering finale and it was ultimately just another letdown. Less stupid than the Season 2 finale, but just mediocre. There's something tragic about a great show devolving into a mediocre one, but here we are."

Esther Zuckerman of The New York Times wrote, "Shauna, in many ways, began Yellowjackets as the audience surrogate. If Jackie was the pristine queen bee, she was the relatable character — the regular person thrown into this mess. Quietly, all along, however, the show has been revealing her to be the Big Bad. Her monstrosity was not made by some mystical forces. It was in her all along. The Wilderness just helped it emerge." Melody McCune of Telltale TV gave the episode a four-star rating out of five and wrote, "“Full Circle” might bring us full circle, but it also sets the stage for a third timeline — the post-rescue timeline — and indicates that the worst is yet to come. Shauna trying to become Antler Queen again can't be good for anyone."
