= Storytelling (Yellowjackets) =

- Yellowjackets episode
- Episode no.: Season 2 Episode 9
- Directed by: Karyn Kusama
- Written by: Ameni Rozsa
- Cinematography by: Shasta Spahn
- Editing by: Jeff Israel; Genevieve Butler
- Original air date: May 28, 2023
- Running time: 61 minutes

Guest appearances
- Nicole Maines as Lisa; Nia Sondaya as Akilah; Alex Wyndham as Kevyn Tan; John Reynolds as Matt Saracusa; Sarah Desjardins as Callie Sadecki; Alexa Barajas as Mari; Elijah Wood as Walter Tattersall

Episode chronology
← Previous "It Chooses"	Next → "It Girl"

"Storytelling" is the ninth episode and season finale of the second season of the American thriller drama television series Yellowjackets. It is the nineteenth overall episode of the series and was written by executive producer Ameni Rozsa, and directed by executive producer Karyn Kusama. It aired on Showtime on May 28, 2023, but it was available to stream two days earlier on Paramount+ with Showtime.

The series follows a New Jersey high school girls' soccer team that travels to Seattle for a national tournament in 1996. While flying over Canada, their plane crashes deep in the wilderness, and the surviving team members are left stranded for nineteen months. The series chronicles their attempts to stay alive as some of the team members are driven to cannibalism. It also focuses on the lives of the survivors 25 years later in 2021, as the events of their ordeal continue to affect them many years after their rescue. In the episode, the women conspire to get Lottie committed, while Kevyn and Matt close in the commune. Flashbacks depict the team eating Javi's body, and Ben reaches his breaking point.

According to Nielsen Media Research, the episode was seen by an estimated 0.134 million household viewers and gained a 0.02 ratings share among adults aged 18–49. The episode received mixed reviews from critics, with many polarized over the decision to kill Natalie.

== Plot ==
=== Flashbacks ===
The girls return with Javi's body, devastating Travis (Kevin Alves). Misty (Samantha Hanratty) informs Lottie (Courtney Eaton) about their intentions to eat Javi, which she is not pleased with. Misty then leaves, and the girls dismember Javi's body. When Ben (Steven Krueger) returns, he tells Natalie (Sophie Thatcher) about Javi's hideout and wants her to come with him, but she feels guilt for his death. Dejected, he leaves alone to Javi's hideout.

Travis is unable to bring himself to eat his own brother, but Van (Liv Hewson) convinces him in doing so by not letting his love and sacrifice go to waste. That night, Lottie tells the group that the wilderness no longer needs her as their leader because they can all communicate with it now and declares Natalie to be the new leader. Ben returns and steals matches. Later, the cabin is set on fire. Shauna wakes up the other girls and they manage to break down the door (that has been barred) using an axe. The girls barely escape the cabin, staring in horror as it burns, and the season ends without us knowing for sure who - or what - burned down the cabin.

=== Present day ===
Before Lottie (Simone Kessell) gets them to drink the cups, Shauna (Melanie Lynskey) states that "it" wants them to select the sacrifice based on a hunt like they did in the wilderness. The others play along and Lottie leaves to get the commune out of their area, unaware that they are conspiring to get her committed to an institution. As Misty (Christina Ricci) checks out, she runs into Walter (Elijah Wood), who reveals he has a plan.

Jeff (Warren Kole) and Callie (Sarah Desjardins) arrive at Lottie's commune, followed by Kevyn (Alex Wyndham) and Matt (John Reynolds). While Kevyn and Walter talk, Jeff decides to surrender himself, claiming he killed Adam. However, Kevyn collapses, with Walter revealing he poisoned him. During this, Lottie gets the women to draw cards again, with the person getting the Queen of Hearts selected as the hunted. Shauna draws it, and despite her resistance, she is forced to run while the others chase her across the commune.

When Matt checks the car, he finds Kevyn's unconscious body, and Walter suddenly appears and kills Kevyn with a gun. Walter explains that he framed Kevyn with Adam's murder, providing the needed evidence in his bank accounts, and that he can cooperate by supporting the claim or also be framed for it. While the women chase Shauna, Callie takes a gun from Jeff's car and shoots Lottie in the shoulder, forcing them to retreat. Taissa (Tawny Cypress) and Van (Lauren Ambrose) then reveal that they called off the assistance to commit Lottie, having decided she does not deserve it.

When Lisa (Nicole Maines) arrives with a shotgun, Misty charges towards her with a phenobarbital injection. However, Natalie (Juliette Lewis) jumps in the way and takes the injection, dying in Misty's arms. While Misty cries over her body, Natalie imagines boarding a plane with Javi, Lottie and her young self. The authorities arrive, taking Natalie's body, and also taking Lottie in an ambulance. Before leaving, she tells them that "it" is satisfied, telling them "you'll see."

== Development ==
=== Production ===
The episode was written by executive producer Ameni Rozsa, and directed by executive producer Karyn Kusama. This marked Rozsa's fifth writing credit, and Kusama's second directing credit.

=== Writing ===
Regarding Natalie's death, Ashley Lyle and Bart Nickerson explained, "As upsetting as it always is to lose a character who is as important to our story as Natalie, the fact is that the stakes of the world are life and death. The ritual itself awakens something in them that had been dormant for a really long time. What we're trying to do with the present-day story is to show that that force is not one that ends when they get rescued." Sophie Thatcher explained Natalie's young self in the plane scene, "she's been so far removed from herself and gone in and out of these suicidal feelings and thoughts, I think my character is talking about when she let herself go in the wilderness."

== Reception ==
=== Viewers ===
The episode was watched by 0.134 million viewers, earning a 0.02 in the 18-49 rating demographics on the Nielsen ratings scale. This means that 0.02 percent of all households with televisions watched the episode. This was a slight decrease from the previous episode, which was watched by 0.143 million viewers with a 0.03 in the 18-49 demographics.

Showtime reported that 1.5 million viewers watched the episode across streaming and linear ratings on its first weekend, making it the second most watched season finale for a Showtime drama.

=== Critical reviews ===
"Storytelling" received mixed reviews from critics. The review aggregator website Rotten Tomatoes reported a 70% approval rating for the episode, with an average rating of 7.4/10 and based on 10 reviews. The site's consensus reads: "Chaotic in both good and bad ways, this season finale suffers from haphazard creative choices but still packs the nasty sting that fans expect."

Hattie Lindert of The A.V. Club gave the episode an "A" and wrote, "As the months dragged on and winter set in, it became more and more confusing where this show could possibly head next, and how much deeper the survivors could actually fall into, well, survival mode. But with their home base on fire and their standing with the wilderness wildly unclear, the only thing that feels certain about this series is that there are deeper, darker depths in store."

Erin Qualey of Vulture gave the episode a 3 star rating out of 5 and wrote, "Losing adult Natalie stings, but the mysteries of the wilderness remain compelling. What's the symbol? What was the pilot doing out there? Who will be the next to die? How will they get rescued? As the show moves into its third season, I'm more concerned about how the present-day storyline will reintegrate with the goings-on in the past. If the wilderness does indeed hear us, I hope it brings us more cohesion in season three."

Proma Khosla of IndieWire gave the episode an "A–" and wrote, "Despite Lottie's best efforts in both past and present, “darkness” (also known as savagery and trauma) fully cloaks the stranded teens of the series, following them well into their tormented adult lives. In a season that has gone from bad to worse (in circumstances, not quality), “Storytelling” is the definitive destruction of hope, light, and sanctuary." Erik Kain of Forbes wrote, "This was a bad episode of TV, not just a disappointing episode of Yellowjackets. Contrived plotlines. Neat and tidy. Like they were hurrying to wrap up all the threads they'd screwed up."

Coleman Spilde of The Daily Beast wrote, "after finishing this season, it comes off more like Natalie admitting her defeat. She fought her way through an impossible life of addiction, suicidal ideation, and unimaginable grief and guilt, only to have all of that courage and perseverance unceremoniously taken from her. It isn't fair. And after this season, I'm not so sure I can learn forgiveness, either." Cade Taylor of Telltale TV gave the episode a 3.5 star rating out of 5 and wrote, "Juliette Lewis is a powerhouse actress with so much raw talent that she exudes through the screen each week. It will be tough to watch Season 3 and deal with her disappearance."

Esther Zuckerman of The New York Times wrote, "The second season of Yellowjackets has been an uneven one — not unusual for a breakout series trying to find its footing after a sensational first go around. But there were frequent moments of transcendence. The farewell to adult Natalie was one of those instances. It was tragic and somehow cathartic and will be hard to shake as the show moves forward." Brittney Bender of Bleeding Cool gave the episode an 8.5 out of 10 rating and wrote, "Showtime's Yellowjackets S02E09 "Storytelling" may have felt rushed at times, it managed to show audiences a stunning depiction of grief & trauma, and the ways survival isn't isolated to the Wilderness. Supernatural elements and certain stories need connecting going forward and this finale helped give that a firm push."
