= Thanksgiving (Canada) (Yellowjackets) =

- Yellowjackets episode
- Episode no.: Season 3 Episode 6
- Directed by: Pete Chatmon
- Written by: Libby Hill; Emily St. James
- Cinematography by: Michael Wale
- Editing by: Daniel Williams
- Original air date: March 16, 2025
- Running time: 54 minutes

Guest appearances
- Alexa Barajas as Mari; Nia Sondaya as Akilah; Nicole Maines as Lisa; Nelson Franklin as Edwin; Jenna Burgess as Teen Melissa; Ashley Sutton as Hannah; Elijah Wood as Walter Tattersall

Episode chronology
← Previous "Did Tai Do That?"	Next → "Croak"

"Thanksgiving (Canada)" is the sixth episode of the third season of the American thriller drama television series Yellowjackets. It is the 25th overall episode of the series and was written by Libby Hill and Emily St. James, and directed by Pete Chatmon. It aired on Showtime on March 16, 2025, but it was available to stream two days earlier on Paramount+ with Showtime.

The series follows a New Jersey high school girls' soccer team that travels to Seattle for a national tournament in 1996. While flying over Canada, their plane crashes deep in the wilderness, and the surviving team members are left stranded for nineteen months. The series chronicles their attempts to stay alive as some of the team members are driven to cannibalism. It also focuses on the lives of the survivors 25 years later in 2021, as the events of their ordeal continue to affect them many years after their rescue. In the episode, Shauna finds that someone is threatening her family, while Misty continues her investigation. Flashbacks depict Ben's hunger strike, and the group's efforts to keep him alive.

The episode received highly positive reviews from critics, who praised the flashback sequences, closure to Ben's story arc and cliffhanger.

== Plot ==
=== Flashbacks ===
Natalie (Sophie Thatcher) delivers food to a captive Ben (Steven Krueger), who is suffering from his injury. Ben asks Natalie to mercy kill him, but she refuses. He continues asking for it over multiple days, but Natalie continues turning it down. Desperate, Ben maintains that he burned down the cabin, but Natalie does not believe it. Shaken, Natalie informs the team that someone else will have to deliver food to Ben.

Later, Mari (Alexa Barajas) finds that Ben has gone on a hunger strike, refusing to eat food from the past week. Natalie begins to hesitate on their purpose with Ben, but Misty (Sammi Hanratty) maintains he is essential and can keep him alive. The team holds Ben down and force feeds him through a tube into his mouth. Needing to reaffirm her visions, Akilah (Nia Sondaya) returns to the cave, where she hallucinates a three-eyed bear near the camp. That night, Natalie sneaks out with a knife, deciding to mercy kill Ben. Travis (Kevin Alves) catches her, but allows her to continue, keeping guard for her. Ben thanks Natalie, and she tearfully plunges a knife into his heart, killing him.

The following morning, Misty sees Natalie leaving Ben's hut and dropping the knife. She is devastated to find Ben's body and embraces him, kissing him goodbye. The team scolds Natalie for her actions, and Lottie (Courtney Eaton) declares that Shauna (Sophie Nélisse) must lead them now. As punishment, Natalie is forced to dismember Ben's body so that the team can eat that night to "honor" him. Lottie feels shaken for eating Ben until she hears the wilderness calling, upon which she screams and convinces the others to join her. Everyone screams and dances around the fire, when Lottie spots someone nearby. Three strangers show up, and react with horror upon seeing Ben's severed head resting on a tree stump.

=== Present day ===
Shauna (Melanie Lynskey) tells Jeff (Warren Kole) and Callie (Sarah Desjardins) that Lottie has died. Panicked, Callie goes to her room and hands over the cassette to Shauna, explaining that someone left it at their door for Shauna. Shauna tells them to pack their stuff, stating that someone is trying to kill them.

Misty (Christina Ricci) continues her investigation, obtaining a DNA sample from the crime scene, and asking a doctor to analyze it. During the day, she receives texts from Walter (Elijah Wood), but she does not want his help. Nevertheless, he has a limo with a chauffeur give her bags with items belonging to Lottie. Shauna calls Van (Lauren Ambrose), asking for help locating a device to play a DAT tape. Van agrees to help, but is disturbed that Taissa (Tawny Cypress) does not seem to care about Lottie's death or Shauna's paranoia. While picking up the player, Van receives a phone call, seemingly from Taissa, saying "I can't... help", even though Taissa is also in the room with her. They get the player to Shauna, and they listen to an unnerving audio of screaming, concluding that this is a threat.

Callie planted a phone in Shauna's bag in an attempt to eavesdrop on Shauna's activities. Shauna finds the phone and deletes the recording; however, Callie is able to retrieve it from the phone's "Recently Deleted" folder. Misty finds that Lisa (Nicole Maines) works as a driver for a restaurant that Lottie had ordered food from just prior to her death. Misty confronts Lisa, and Lisa explains that Lottie gave her $50,000 cash and that she saw her meet with Taissa on the day she died. At home, Misty leaves a message asking Taissa to meet up. While sleeping, Taissa awakens agitated, only to calmly go back to sleep, worrying Van.

== Development ==
=== Production ===
The episode was written by Libby Hill and Emily St. James, and directed by Pete Chatmon. This marked Hill's first writing credit, James's first writing credit, and Chatmon's first directing credit.

=== Writing ===
Steven Krueger had "known from the beginning" that the third season would mark the end to Ben's arc. Series co-creator Ashley Lyle said, "We really ran the thought experiment in the writers room, like, ‘Is there any way to not kill him? Because we want to be around Steven.’ He's so good, but we just knew that it was the story that wanted to be told."

Krueger added, "No actor wants to hear that they're losing their job. That's never a fun phone call to get. In my case, the blow was cushioned because I kind of knew this was coming. My first question was, “Okay, yeah, that sucks, but how does it happen?” I wanted to know if it was an integral part of the story. And once I heard about it, I was so excited. I was ready to dig in because I knew this was going be such an arc." Sophie Thatcher explained Natalie's decision in euthanizing Ben, "She has that special connection with Ben where I think there's still trust, so to see him in this state is confusing and devastating and numbing. This is the biggest turning point for her. Where Javi was a huge turning point, this is truly the loss of all innocence."

=== Filming ===
For Ben's death, Krueger said, "If I remember correctly, that scene was pretty grueling to shoot. They did it from a lot of different angles because I think they weren’t ultimately sure exactly how they wanted it to play." Thatcher commented, "he had lost weight, he had done all this prep, and just to see him in this state and to see his dedication was already so inspiring and brought me into it immediately."

== Reception ==
=== Critical reviews ===
"Thanksgiving (Canada)" received highly positive reviews from critics. The review aggregator website Rotten Tomatoes reported a 100% approval rating for the episode, based on 7 reviews.

Jen Lennon of The A.V. Club gave the episode an "A–" and wrote, "“Thanksgiving (Canada)” pays off all that subtle work when Natalie kills Ben in the episode's first big shocking moment and finally falls apart. After everything she's experienced — her dad's abuse, witnessing her dad's death and having her mom blame her for it, the plane crash, allowing Javi to die in her place — this is the moment that breaks her."

Erin Qualey of Vulture gave the episode a 4 star rating out of 5 and wrote, "Is this it? Are we finally getting rescued?! This introduction of “Others” in the wilderness has the potential to energize the plot and move things in a different direction than various iterations of survival tactics and wilderness worship, and it will certainly also shake up the social dynamics of the group as a whole." Samantha Graves of Collider wrote, "While the previous five episodes were still fascinating and always kept us glued, there was always something missing from it. This week amps up every aspect and finally digs into the story from every angle, every character, and every possible storyline, giving us a juicy and irresistible installment filled with returning characters, shocking reveals, and perhaps the most shocking twist of all."

Esther Zuckerman of The New York Times wrote that the final scene was an "exciting conclusion to a jam-packed episode". Melody McCune of Telltale TV gave the episode a 4 star rating out of 5 and wrote, "Yellowjackets is barreling down an interesting narrative path now. Fingers crossed that the final four episodes of the season maintain this momentum and level of intrigue and offer a satisfying payoff."
