= A Normal, Boring Life =

- Yellowjackets episode
- Episode no.: Season 3 Episode 8
- Directed by: Anya Adams
- Written by: Julia Bicknell
- Cinematography by: Michael Wale
- Editing by: Genevieve Butler
- Original air date: March 30, 2025
- Running time: 55 minutes

Guest appearances
- Hilary Swank as Melissa Kaplan (special guest star); Ella Purnell as Jackie Taylor; Alexa Barajas as Mari; Nia Sondaya as Akilah; Joel McHale as Kodiak; Jenna Burgess as Teen Melissa; Ashley Sutton as Hannah

Episode chronology
← Previous "Croak"	Next → "How the Story Ends"

"A Normal, Boring Life" is the eighth episode of the third season of the American thriller drama television series Yellowjackets. It is the 27th overall episode of the series and was written by co-executive producer Julia Bicknell, and directed by Anya Adams. It aired on Showtime on March 30, 2025, but it was available to stream two days earlier on Paramount+ with Showtime.

The series follows a New Jersey high school girls' soccer team that travels to Seattle for a national tournament in 1996. While flying over Canada, their plane crashes deep in the wilderness, and the surviving team members are left stranded for nineteen months. The series chronicles their attempts to stay alive as some of the team members are driven to cannibalism. It also focuses on the lives of the survivors 25 years later in 2021, as the events of their ordeal continue to affect them many years after their rescue. In the episode, Shauna confronts the woman in the house for the DAT tape, while Taissa gets desperate in trying to save Van. Flashbacks depict the team's decision to use Kodiak and Hannah to return to civilization.

According to Nielsen Media Research, the episode was seen by an estimated 0.094 million household viewers and gained a 0.01 ratings share among adults aged 18–49. The episode received praise from critics for the scenes between Lynskey and Swank, while others criticized some of the storytelling elements.

== Plot ==
=== Dream ===
Adult Shauna dreams of her teenage self working a dead-end job as a grocery store cashier. She is taunted by Jackie for having no further aspirations and nothing to go back to. Shauna is then distracted by a horde of moths that break through the ceiling light.

=== Flashbacks ===
Misty (Sammi Hanratty) finds her glasses and returns to the camp. The girls confront Hannah (Ashley Sutton), who recognizes the girls from the plane crash news. She reveals that there was a search party but they eventually gave up, disappointing them. Whilst Kodiak (Joel McHale) leads them to civilization, Travis (Kevin Alves) reveals to Akilah (Nia Sondaya) that he lied about his visions and that she is not "a seer", instead believing her hallucinations are the result of the noxious cave gases, disappointing her. Akilah thus purposefully leaves clues for others, leading to the trio being caught and forced to return to camp.

Determining that they can use Kodiak and Hannah to get back to civilization, the girls prepare to leave. Lottie (Courtney Eaton) claims "it" does not want them back there, but her concerns are dismissed. Melissa (Jenna Burgess) confronts Shauna (Sophie Nélisse), feeling she does not prioritize her relationship. Shauna explains that she cares for her, but is distracted by a large moth. Taissa (Jasmin Savoy Brown) expresses concern to Van about what they will have to reveal their relationship to the public, but Van assures her that rescue is more important. As the group prepares for the journey, Lottie refuses to leave. Shauna surprises everyone by also staying, feeling something is not right. Taissa declares she is staying, too. Natalie gives up trying to convince them and directs everyone else out, but Shauna coldly declares that no one will be leaving.

=== Present day ===
In the morning, Shauna (Melanie Lynskey) sneaks into the house and hides in a room, which belongs to a woman named Kelly (Hilary Swank), her wife Alex, Hannah's daughter, and their children. After Alex leaves to take the children to school, Kelly immediately grabs a knife, aware that someone is spying on her. Shauna comes out, scaring Kelly, who is actually Melissa.

At the hospital, Taissa (Tawny Cypress) is informed that Van (Lauren Ambrose) is worsening and might need to go into hospice, which she refuses to believe. Hoping to appease "it", she and Misty (Christina Ricci) go to the hospice, entering the room of a patient in coma who is nearing death. Taissa almost smothers the man with a pillow, but cannot bring herself to do it before he passes away from his condition. "The Other Tai" locks herself in with Van. While staying at the hotel, Jeff (Warren Kole) runs into the furniture store clients, who are meeting with a new partner. After talking with Callie (Sarah Desjardins), Jeff concludes they are not really in danger despite Shauna's concerns. They check out of the hotel, and Jeff apologizes to the clients, blaming Shauna's behavior, but still maintaining that he is trustworthy.

During their conversation, Melissa explains that she did not truly love Shauna in the wilderness, and that she is content with her new life, which she started after faking her death shortly after rescue. She also explains that her therapist suggested she should move forward, which is why she sent the tape to Shauna, along with a note asking her to move on, which Shauna did not read. Nevertheless, Shauna still believes Melissa tried to kill her, while Melissa mocks the lie she fabricated through her life after leaving the wilderness. Suddenly, Shauna attacks her and they engage in a brutal fight, which culminates when Shauna bites off a piece of Melissa's skin. She forces her to eat it, threatening to reveal to Melissa's family that she is not really "Kelly", and who she really is.

== Development ==
=== Production ===
The episode was written by co-executive producer Julia Bicknell, and directed by Anya Adams. This marked Bicknell's third writing credit, and Adams' second directing credit.

=== Writing ===
Courtney Eaton explained Lottie's decision to stay, "I think she's someone that's grown up not really trusting herself or her parents. She's been left to her own devices and she doesn't trust her brain — her parents have made her not trust her brain. In the wilderness something just clicks — it feels right, granted, maybe it isn't always. But I think she is well-intentioned out there. I do think that they've found something in themselves that they wouldn't have found at home. Lottie would be a very different person if she didn't have this experience of getting to discover herself fully."

=== Casting ===
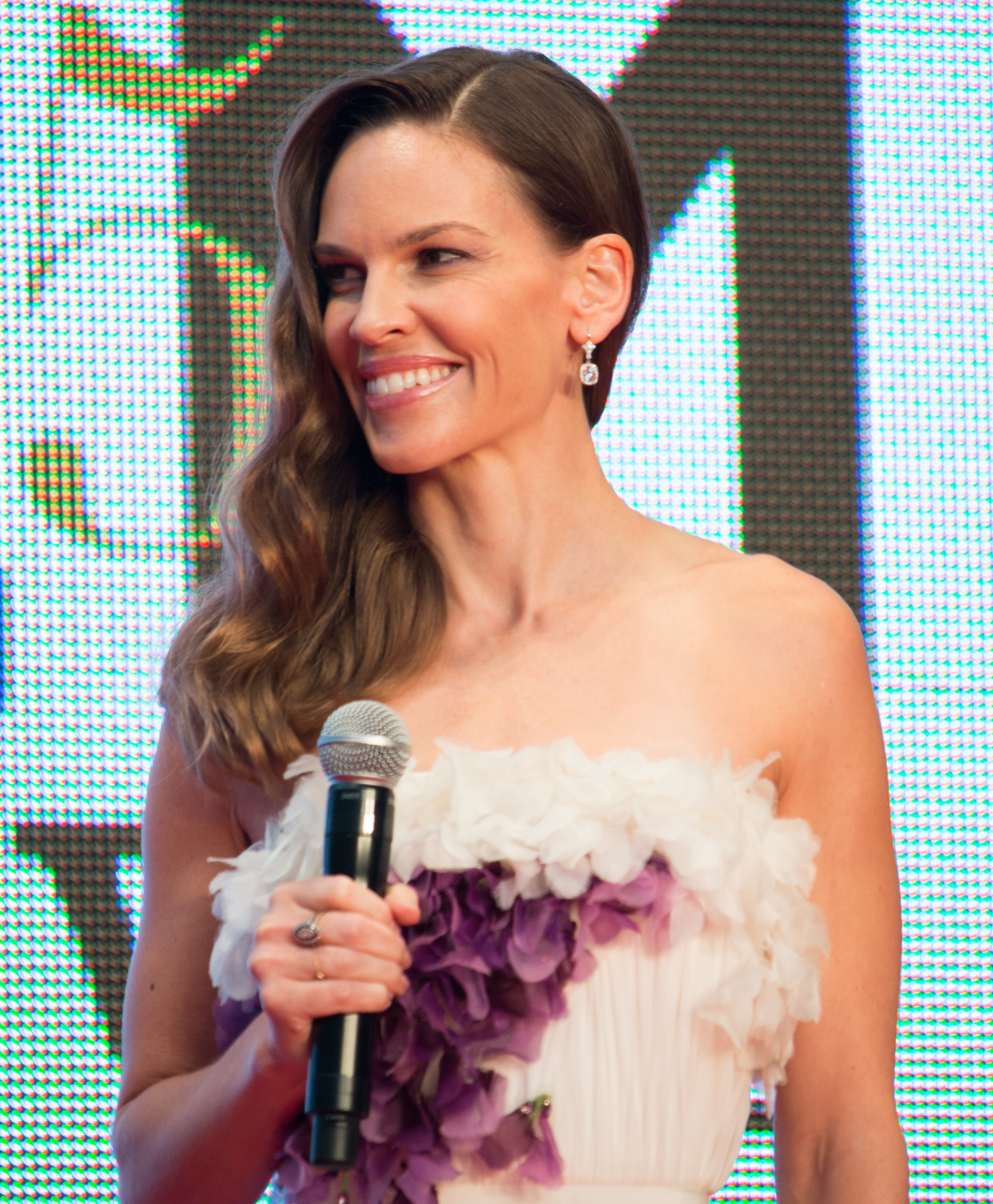
Hilary Swank makes her debut in the series with the episode.

In September 2024, it was reported that Hilary Swank would have a recurring role in the season for an unspecified role. Swank had only watched the pilot episode, feeling it was "too violent for my taste." Nevertheless, she joined the series "after having a conversation with the creators, I was very intrigued to be a part of it, and thought, this is going to be a blast. I love the psychological aspect of it. Ashley Lyle expressed surprise that some fans deduced that she was an adult Melissa a few weeks before the episode aired.

Swank received a pitch for the series just two weeks before the episode started filming. She was intrigued with the role, "I love the idea of all the psychology behind what makes someone tick who's been through such trauma. People who have been through that intense of a past, how do you move on? When is it triggered? How is it triggered? And what choices do you make from there? All of that is really intriguing to me." She explained Melissa's actions, "I pieced together that she really tried to move on. She has a choice. She can either sit and stew and have nightmares about what went on, or she can try and heal and make some type of peace with it. I really believe that. But I think what happens when you've gone through something traumatic and you start getting triggers, the trauma that's still in your tissue starts coming out and you don't have control over it." Regarding the final scene, she said, "They both have experienced so much trauma that that's how they deal. They almost go back to being 2-year-olds. They're like, 'I don't know how to deal with my emotions except for biting your arm off because there's nothing else I can do to get this release and show you that I mean what I'm saying.' It's literally like a 2-year-old."

== Reception ==
=== Viewers ===
The episode was watched by 0.094 million viewers, earning a 0.01 in the 18-49 rating demographics on the Nielsen ratings scale. This means that 0.01 percent of all households with televisions watched the episode. This was a slight increase from the previous episode, which was watched by 0.068 million viewers with a 0.005 in the 18-49 demographics.

=== Critical reviews ===
"A Normal, Boring Life" received mixed reviews. The review aggregator website Rotten Tomatoes reported a 63% approval rating for the episode, based on 8 reviews with a 7.2/10 average rating.

Jen Lennon of The A.V. Club gave the episode a "B–" and wrote, "The show dedicates almost all of adult Shauna's scenes this week to the confrontation between her and Melissa. And even though their conversation is cut up into several different scenes that are interspersed with other characters' plotlines, it's still a lot of dialogue, and Swank and Melanie Lynskey sell every line of it. I almost wish this episode had really gone for it and just been a two-hander. Everything else feels extraneous when you've got two masters of their craft facing each other down with knives at the ready."

Erin Qualey of Vulture gave the episode a perfect 5 star rating out of 5 and wrote, "That the show uses this scene to deploy Sleater Kinney for the very first time in the show's run just makes the moment all the more perfect. 'Dig Me Out' plays over the credits as we're left realizing that Shauna is further from 'normal' than we ever could have dreamed." Samantha Graves of Collider wrote, "Despite their reluctance, Nat declares that the rest of the team is leaving — but then Shauna decides to pull the Antler Queen card and tells everyone that they're not going anywhere. Are the Yellowjackets about to experience a major split?"

Esther Zuckerman of The New York Times wrote, "Melissa isn't wrong. Shauna thrives on drama. Still, the tone with which Melissa says all this is slightly eerie. Perhaps this is just a very good cover. Accurate or not, Melissa's assessment succeeds in getting under Shauna's skin." Melody McCune of Telltale TV gave the episode a 4.1 star rating out of 5 and wrote, "'A Normal, Boring Life' is one of the strongest episodes in Yellowjackets Season 3. For once, the present timeline was more engrossing than the '90s timeline (which is still entertaining in its own right), and that's thanks to Melanie Lynskey and Hilary Swank's natural chemistry and raw visceral performances."

Others critiqued the show's buildup to a late-season twist, with Jean Henegan of Pop Culture Maniacs expressing that Melissa did not feel fully developed enough of a character in the 1990s timeline for her present-day reappearance to land with emotional resonance.
