= It Chooses =

- Yellowjackets episode
- Episode no.: Season 2 Episode 8
- Directed by: Daisy von Scherler Mayer
- Written by: Sarah L. Thompson; Liz Phang
- Editing by: Kevin D. Ross
- Production code: Francois Dagenais
- Original air date: May 21, 2023
- Running time: 51 minutes

Guest appearances
- Nicole Maines as Lisa; Nia Sondaya as Akilah; Alex Wyndham as Kevyn Tan; John Reynolds as Matt Saracusa; Ella Purnell as Jackie; Sarah Desjardins as Callie Sadecki; Alexa Barajas as Mari; Elijah Wood as Walter Tattersall

Episode chronology
← Previous "Burial"	Next → "Storytelling"

"It Chooses" is the eighth episode of the second season of the American thriller drama television series Yellowjackets. It is the eighteenth overall episode of the series and was written by executive producer Sarah L. Thompson and co-executive producer Liz Phang, and directed by Daisy von Scherler Mayer. It aired on Showtime on May 21, 2023, but it was available to stream two days earlier on Paramount+ with Showtime.

The series follows a New Jersey high school girls' soccer team that travels to Seattle for a national tournament in 1996. While flying over Canada, their plane crashes deep in the wilderness, and the surviving team members are left stranded for nineteen months. The series chronicles their attempts to stay alive as some of the team members are driven to cannibalism. It also focuses on the lives of the survivors 25 years later in 2021, as the events of their ordeal continue to affect them many years after their rescue. In the episode, Lottie gets the group to reveal their secrets, while also explaining there might be a reason for their state. Flashbacks depict the team's desperate attempts in finding food, concluding that they must sacrifice one of themselves.

According to Nielsen Media Research, the episode was seen by an estimated 0.143 million household viewers and gained a 0.03 ratings share among adults aged 18–49. The episode received critical acclaim, with critics praising the flashbacks, revelations and performances.

== Plot ==
=== Flashbacks ===
The team begins to experience hallucinations, with Akilah (Nia Sondaya) shocked that her pet rat is actually dead. During this, Ben (Steven Krueger) discovers that a secluded Javi (Luciano Leroux) has been drawing a tree with a strange symbol. He reconfigures his crutches to better suit the snow, hoping to find the location where Javi stayed. He finds a tree that resembles the drawing, and discovers a hot spring underneath, realizing this is where Javi survived.

Lottie (Courtney Eaton) is still recovering from Shauna's beating, and tells Misty (Sammi Hanratty) that if she dies, she does not want them to waste her body as they are running out of food. Unwilling to let Lottie decide her own fate, the group decides to use cards among themselves, with the person that draws the only Queen in the deck is selected to die. Natalie (Sophie Thatcher) finds that her card is the queen of hearts and prepares to let Shauna (Sophie Nélisse) kill her. Before Shauna slices her neck, Travis (Kevin Alves) pushes her, allowing Natalie to escape the cabin. A group of the girls chases after Natalie. Javi also runs out and meets up with Natalie, saying he can help her by taking her to his cave. As they run across a frozen lake, the ice cracks and Javi falls in the icy water. Natalie tries to save Javi, but Misty prevents her efforts. Choosing Javi as their sacrifice, none of the other girls intervene, allowing him to freeze to death in the lake.

=== Present day ===
Shauna (Melanie Lynskey) tells the group that the police found Adam's body, and that Jeff (Warren Kole) already knows, frustrating Misty (Christina Ricci) as Shauna did not follow her plan. As they argue, Shauna reveals Jeff was the real blackmailer and Misty reveals that Taissa (Tawny Cypress) hired Jessica Roberts to spy on them. Misty subsequently shocks the group by telling them she orchestrated Jessica's death.

With the body found, Kevyn (Alex Wyndham) and Matt (John Reynolds) obtain a search warrant for Shauna's house. They question Jeff, making him wonder if Shauna was truly capable of dismembering Adam's body. After they leave, Jeff talks with Callie (Sarah Desjardins) over Shauna's condition, explaining that she went through a lot. He also reveals that she had and lost a baby in the wilderness, shocking Callie. During this, Walter (Elijah Wood) decides to get involved with Adam's case, and emails the police that he has information.

Taissa apologizes for starting their problems by having Jessica begin oppo research on each of them. Lottie (Simone Kessell) explains that they have a greater purpose for their reunion, referring to "it" as wanting something from them. She then presents the group with six cups, one containing phenobarbital, believing that "it" wants a sacrifice. Lottie maintains that they have ruined their own lives, and explains that they cannot decide who dies, as "it" will choose, making them question her sanity.

== Development ==
=== Production ===
The episode was written by executive producer Sarah L. Thompson and co-executive producer Liz Phang, and directed by Daisy von Scherler Mayer. This marked Thompson's fifth writing credit, Phang's fifth writing credit, and von Scherler Mayer's third directing credit.

=== Writing ===
Regarding Javi's death, Sophie Thatcher explained that this layered out more of Natalie's character, "You're like, “OK, so this is why she's so fucked up.” That feeling that I was waiting for and that I kept talking about waiting for was connecting the dots between the two. It always felt like younger Nat, out of everybody, had her shit together. And I think this, Javi's death, is the beginning of the unfolding of Natalie. She's always been focused on survival and so determined. But this kind of taints her morality, and she becomes selfish. And it makes her just a different person."

== Reception ==
=== Viewers ===
The episode was watched by 0.143 million viewers, earning a 0.03 in the 18-49 rating demographics on the Nielsen ratings scale. This means that 0.03 percent of all households with televisions watched the episode. This was a slight decrease from the previous episode, which was watched by 0.165 million viewers with a 0.03 in the 18-49 demographics.

=== Critical reviews ===
"It Chooses" received critical acclaim. The review aggregator website Rotten Tomatoes reported a 100% approval rating for the episode, with an average rating of 8.8/10 and based on 8 reviews.

Hattie Lindert of The A.V. Club gave the episode an "A" and wrote, "When everyone has an equal(ish) hand in carrying the crazy train, no one has to stand in the spotlight on judgment day. So far, it's what's kept them alive, that continual agreement to each sin a little in the name of some greater good, or greater god. But as season two moves into its back half, the jig in both timelines is mercilessly up; and the greater the pressure on the survivors to make hard decisions with their own bare hands, the stronger the pull to leave life, death, and justice up to the wilderness."

Erin Qualey of Vulture gave the episode a perfect 5 star rating out of 5 and wrote, "The eighth episode of the season, “It Chooses,” reveals that many of the things that viewers thought might possibly be supernatural in nature, um, weren't. Mari hearing the dripping noise? Hunger. Akilah's inexplicably tame and cuddly mouse friend? Dead. Again, it was hunger. Hunger will do funky things to the body's major organs before everything goes into full shut-down mode, so everyone in the cabin is literally losing their minds as they slowly starve to death." Proma Khosla of IndieWire gave the episode an "A–" and wrote, "This was not how anyone intended the sacrifice to go, but the chase and the ferocity change it forever. It's might not be what adult Lottie means to invoke when she hands out a poisoned beverage in the future, but surely the others feel it too; The violence of the hunt feeds just as much as the spoils."

Bernard Boo of Den of Geek gave the episode a 3 star rating out of 5 and wrote, "The show continues to benefit from having the present-day characters convened at Charlotte's wellness center, and while the ‘90s segments suffer from some head-scratching character behavior, it's still entertaining as ever watching the group descend ever deeper into madness." Erik Kain of Forbes wrote, "Here's what's happening (almost) every time I watch an episode of Yellowjackets in Season 2: I enjoy the episode a lot while watching it and then afterwards I start to think about what happened and get annoyed. This episode was really gripping and intense, but after taking a few steps back... I'm mostly just irritated by a lot of the choices the show's writers are making."

Coleman Spilde of The Daily Beast wrote, "“It Chooses” was outstanding enough to defer my suspicions past next week's finale, and into Season 3. I am hesitant, but I'm back in again. This season desperately needed something other than the inevitable cannibalistic feast of Jackie in its first half to quell my disappointments, and this harrowing hunting sequence certainly did the trick. Now, Yellowjackets Season 2 just has to land the plane. Here's hoping it's less of a crash-and-burn affair than the group's trip to nationals." Cade Taylor of Telltale TV gave the episode a 4.5 star rating out of 5 and wrote, "Yellowjackets Season 2 Episode 8,” It Chooses,” is another gripping hour of television that continues to push the series' limits and up the stakes."

Esther Zuckerman of The New York Times wrote, "The surviving Yellowjackets can blame the wilderness for only so much. At some point, they have to take responsibility for all the pain they've caused. Still, maybe the guilt would be worse than just drinking Lottie's death potion." Brittney Bender of Bleeding Cool gave the episode a perfect 10 out of 10 rating and wrote, "Showtime's Yellowjackets S02E08 "It Chooses" was one of the series' best episodes so far. Full of brilliant editing choices and superb acting from the entire cast, this is an episode worthy of every ounce of praise it will likely receive."
