= Yellowjackets season 4 =

Season of television series

Yellowjackets
- Season 4
- Promotional poster
- Starring: Melanie Lynskey; Tawny Cypress; Sophie Nélisse; Jasmin Savoy Brown; Sophie Thatcher; Samantha Hanratty; Warren Kole; Courtney Eaton; Liv Hewson; Kevin Alves; Sarah Desjardins; Nia Sondaya; Jenna Burgess; Christina Ricci
- No. of episodes: 1

Release
- Original network: Paramount+ with Showtime; Paramount+ Premium
- Original release: November 20, 2026 – present

Season chronology
- ← Previous; Season 3

The fourth and final season of the American thriller drama television series Yellowjackets premiered on November 20, 2026, on Paramount+ Premium. (Note: Every episode will be released two days later on Paramount+ with Showtime.) Series creators Ashley Lyle and Bart Nickerson serve as the showrunners for the season, alongside executive producer Jonathan Lisco. The series is centered on the survivors of a 1996 plane crash in the wilderness. The narrative is set in dual timelines: the first follows the teens in the 1990s after the crash and the second follows the survivors 25 years later.

The ensemble cast includes Melanie Lynskey, Tawny Cypress, Sophie Nélisse, Jasmin Savoy Brown, Sophie Thatcher, Samantha Hanratty, Warren Kole, and Christina Ricci, who all return from the previous season. Nia Sondaya and Jenna Burgess were promoted to the main cast after featuring in a recurring role in the previous seasons.

== Cast ==
=== Main ===
- Melanie Lynskey as Shauna Sadecki, née Shipman
  - Sophie Nélisse as teen Shauna
- Tawny Cypress as Taissa Turner
  - Jasmin Savoy Brown as teen Taissa
- Christina Ricci as Misty Quigley
  - Samantha Hanratty as teen Misty
- Sophie Thatcher as Natalie Scatorccio
- Courtney Eaton as Lottie Matthews
- Liv Hewson as Van Palmer
- Warren Kole as Jeff Sadecki
- Kevin Alves as teen Travis Martinez
- Sarah Desjardins as Callie Sadecki
- Nia Sondaya as Akilah
- Jenna Burgess as teen Melissa

=== Special guest ===
- Hilary Swank as Melissa Kaplan
- June Squibb as Geraldine

=== Recurring ===
- Elijah Wood as Walter Tattersall
- Ashley Sutton as Hannah Sophia Finch
- Vanessa Prasad as Gen
- Anisa Harris as Robin
- Silvana Estifanos as Britt
- Molly Ringwald as Vicky Palmer
- Devon Sawa as Howard
- Dulé Hill as Officer Rollins
- Ken Marino as Russell
- Jaylee Hamidi as Alex
- Samuel Braun as teen Jeff

== Episodes ==
No. overall	No. in season	Title	Directed by	Written by	Original release date	U.S. viewers (millions)
30	1	"Hivemind"	Bart Nickerson	Julia Bicknell & Elise Brown	November 20, 2026	TBD
31	2	"Human Interest"	TBA	Rich Monahan & Ameni Rozsa	November 27, 2026	TBD
32	3	TBA	TBA	Kristen Layden & Terry Wesley	December 4, 2026	TBD
33	4	TBA	TBA	Alisha Brophy & Michael Russo	December 11, 2026	TBD
34	5	TBA	TBA	Cameron B. Dupont & Sarah L. Thompson	December 18, 2026	TBD
35	6	TBA	TBA	Libby Hill & Emily St. James	December 25, 2026	TBD
36	7	TBA	TBA	Kristen Layden & Danny Mears	January 1, 2027	TBD
37	8	TBA	TBA	Sarah L. Thompson	January 8, 2027	TBD
38	9	TBA	TBA	Ameni Rozsa	January 15, 2027	TBD
39	10	TBA	TBA	TBA	January 22, 2027	TBD

== Production ==
=== Development ===
Showtime renewed the series for a fourth season on May 20, 2025. In October, it was announced as the series' final season, with production starting in 2026 and the season premiering that year. Lyle and Nickerson stated:

After three incredible seasons, and great consideration, we're excited to announce that we will be bringing the story of Yellowjackets to its twisted conclusion in this fourth and final season. We've always known there would come a point when the story would tell us it wants to end, and it's our belief that our job – our responsibility – is to listen. Telling this emotional, wild, and deeply human story has been a profoundly meaningful experience and a true honor for us.

=== Casting ===
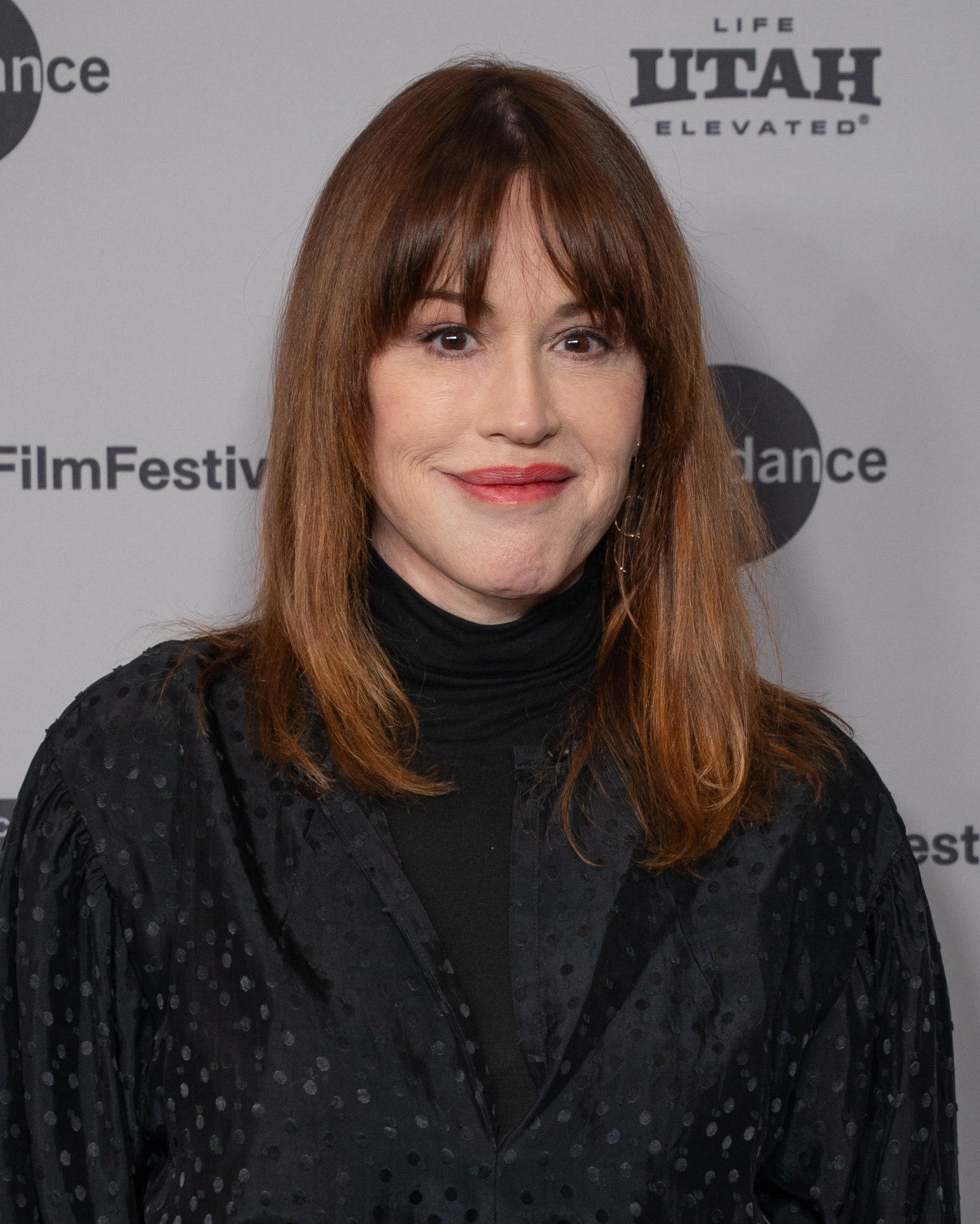
Molly Ringwald joined the cast in a recurring guest role.

In February 2026, Nia Sondaya, who plays Akilah, was promoted to series regular for the fourth season. Also in February, Molly Ringwald and June Squibb were announced to have been cast in the fourth season. On March 18, 2026, Jenna Burgess, who plays teenage Melissa, was promoted to series regular for the fourth season.

=== Filming ===
Filming for the fourth and final season began on March 2, 2026, and finished on July 27, 2026.

== Reception ==
On the review aggregator website Rotten Tomatoes, 82% of 22 critics' reviews are positive, with an average rating of 6.9/10. Metacritic assigned a score of 58 out of 100 based on 10 critics, indicating "mixed or average" reviews.

== Release ==
A teaser video for the final season was released on October 13, 2026. The next day, the full trailer was released. The season premiered on November 20, 2026, on Paramount+, and will release weekly until its series finale on January 22, 2027; episodes will air two days later on Showtime.
