= It Girl (Yellowjackets) =

- Yellowjackets episode
- Episode no.: Season 3 Episode 1
- Directed by: Bart Nickerson
- Written by: Jonathan Lisco; Ashley Lyle; Bart Nickerson
- Cinematography by: Shasta Spahn
- Editing by: Kevin D. Ross
- Original air date: February 16, 2025
- Running time: 59 minutes

Guest appearances
- Alexa Barajas as Mari; Nia Sondaya as Akilah; Jenna Burgess as Teen Melissa; Jeff Holman as Randy Walsh; Naomi Simpson as Vera; Elijah Wood as Walter Tattersall

Episode chronology
← Previous "Storytelling"	Next → "Dislocation"

"It Girl" is the first episode of the third season of the American thriller drama television series Yellowjackets. It is the 20th overall episode of the series and was written by executive producer Jonathan Lisco and series creators Ashley Lyle and Bart Nickerson, and directed by Nickerson. It aired on Showtime on February 16, 2025, but it was available to stream two days earlier on Paramount+ with Showtime.

The series follows a New Jersey high school girls' soccer team that travels to Seattle for a national tournament in 1996. While flying over Canada, their plane crashes deep in the wilderness, and the surviving team members are left stranded for nineteen months. The series chronicles their attempts to stay alive as some of the team members are driven to cannibalism. It also focuses on the lives of the survivors 25 years later in 2021, as the events of their ordeal continue to affect them many years after their rescue. In the episode, Shauna, Misty, Taissa and Van try to move on after Natalie's death. Flashbacks depict the team's new status in spring, when Shauna becomes distant from the group.

According to Nielsen Media Research, the episode was seen by an estimated 0.092 million household viewers and gained a 0.02 ratings share among adults aged 18–49. The episode received generally positive reviews from critics, who praised the performances, although some criticized the slow pacing and lack of progress.

== Plot ==
=== Flashbacks ===
A few months after the cabin burned down, summer solstice has arrived. The group has built huts in the forest, and tensions appear to have worn out, with Natalie (Sophie Thatcher) leading the group. Nevertheless, Shauna (Sophie Nélisse) is growing distant from the group, unwilling to participate in some of their activities.

The team has been trying to find Ben (Steven Krueger) for months, but Natalie convinces the others that he is dead. Ben has been wandering through the woods on his own, setting traps to prevent the girls from catching him. He stumbles upon a pit with a crate with supplies. After eating a protein bar, Ben hides the pit and walks away with the crate. Lottie (Courtney Eaton) helps Travis (Kevin Alves) in moving past his grief by giving him a tea made from mushrooms. Travis is shaken by the experience, as he begins to hear the trees screaming, but Lottie asks him to connect with it.

That night, the girls prepare for a feast. Tensions between Shauna and Mari (Alexa Barajas) arise when Shauna spits in her soup, causing a fight. Fed up, Mari chooses to leave the group. While holding a memorial for the fallen, the group begins to hear strange noises, similar to what Travis heard. In the morning, Ben sees that something fell in his trap pit. He looks upon it, seeing an injured Mari yelling for help.

=== Present day ===
Six weeks after the events at the commune, Shauna (Melanie Lynskey), Taissa (Tawny Cypress) and Van (Lauren Ambrose) attend Natalie's funeral. Misty (Christina Ricci) chooses not to go, still feeling guilty over her role in Natalie's death, despite Walter (Elijah Wood) trying to convince her to move forward.

Having separated from Simone, Taissa takes Van on a date to a lavish restaurant. When they decide to simply not pay the bill and escape the restaurant, they are chased by the waiter, who is nearly hit by a bus and collapses due to a heart attack. As Taissa and Van kiss in an alleyway, Van has a vision of the Man with No Eyes. At a bar, Misty has several shots of whisky and almost gets in a fight with a few bar patrons before leaving. As she walks off, Walter shows up in his car, as she left her phone in the bar and he was called. Misty finally breaks down, expressing her guilt for Natalie's death.

When her classmates begin mocking Shauna and the other survivors, Callie (Sarah Desjardins) drops animal guts in front of them, getting suspended from school. While Jeff (Warren Kole) is upset, Shauna tries to make sense of the situation. She discusses the incident with Callie, but actually laughs with her when they watch the video. Later, Callie finds an envelope outside the house, addressed to Shauna. She finds a cassette, which she hides from Jeff.

== Development ==
=== Production ===
The episode was written by executive producer Jonathan Lisco and series creators Ashley Lyle and Bart Nickerson, and directed by Nickerson. This marked Lisco's third writing credit, Lyle's fifth writing credit, Nickerson's fifth writing credit, and Nickerson's first directing credit. Commenting on his debut, Nickerson said "What was the most different, and probably the part that was the most exciting and rewarding, was getting to work in such a granular way with the cast."

=== Writing ===
Sophie Nélisse explained young Shauna's new personality, "I think it's difficult for her because she feels extremely responsible for both of these events even though they weren't really directly her fault, and I think what's hard is that Lottie seems to be steering the group in a way of honoring those deaths and to try to make the best out of what's happened as where I don't think Shauna is ready to quite move on and doesn't see it in that perspective. And I don't think she wants the death of her baby to be a shared experience. It's something that's so close and personal to her, and I don't think anyone in the group can truly understand the trauma and the loss that she's had to undergo. I think it's too personal of a story to be shared with everyone, and so I think she just wants to live that moment and be able to grieve on her own."

== Reception ==
=== Viewers ===
The episode was watched by 0.092 million viewers, earning a 0.02 in the 18-49 rating demographics on the Nielsen ratings scale. This means that 0.02 percent of all households with televisions watched the episode. This was a 32% decrease from the previous episode, which was watched by 0.134 million viewers with a 0.02 in the 18-49 demographics.

Showtime reported that counting its streaming numbers on Paramount+, 2.03 million viewers watched the episode in its first weekend, the most-streamed episode in the series.

=== Critical reviews ===
"It Girl" received generally positive reviews from critics. The review aggregator website Rotten Tomatoes reported a 100% approval rating for the episode, based on 10 reviews.

Jen Lennon of The A.V. Club gave the episode a "B" and wrote, "He hears a whimpering sound and smiles to himself, thinking he's caught an animal in one of his traps. It's actually Mari, though, who's fallen into the pit and injured herself. Cake's cover of 'I Will Survive' drops in, and Mari really starts screaming once she realizes who's standing at the edge of the pit, looking down on her from above."

Erin Qualey of Vulture gave the episode a 4 star rating out of 5 and wrote, "Are we ever going to get answers to the questions that linger like that killer Cranberries song? Or is the show continuing to string us along until it runs out of gas? If the opening scene of this season is any indication, the answer might be the latter. But it's a good thing we don't just have the opening scene to go on."

Brynna Arens of Den of Geek wrote, "The third season of Showtime's Yellowjackets has left the harsh, unforgiving winter behind in favor of the warm comforts of summer, and with this change in seasons comes an incredibly strong dual episode season opener." Erik Kain of Forbes wrote, "Just as bad, while the modern-day storyline was really compelling in Season 1, it dragged out endlessly in Season 2, and ended in one of the most ludicrous, silly, mind-blowingly stupid ways imaginable. So I come to Season 3 with skepticism and with that lingering bad taste in my mouth. Because after two episodes that were, in some ways, definitely much better than the final episodes of Season 2, I still don't like any of these people."

Esther Zuckerman of The New York Times wrote, "Based on this first episode back, Yellowjackets seems to be trying to recapture the juicy magic of its breakout first season, which sucked us in with its tale of bloodthirsty would-be high school soccer stars. Right off the bat, this premiere is a little goofier, a little cattier and a little less self-serious." Melody McCune of Telltale TV gave the episode a 4 star rating out of 5 and wrote, "Beyond that, Yellowjackets delves deeper into the aforementioned character dynamics, specifically Travis and Lottie. Admittedly, there was trepidation on my end that this could go down the romantic route, but what we've seen between them thus far is significantly more interesting. Initially, Lottie believes that because she can no longer 'hear' the Wilderness, what she experienced isn't real."
