= Dislocation (Yellowjackets) =

- Yellowjackets episode
- Episode no.: Season 3 Episode 2
- Directed by: Bille Woodruff
- Written by: Rich Monahan; Ameni Rozsa
- Cinematography by: Michael Wale
- Editing by: Daniel Williams
- Original air date: February 16, 2025
- Running time: 58 minutes

Guest appearances
- Alexa Barajas as Mari; Nia Sondaya as Akilah; Jenna Burgess as Teen Melissa; Elijah Wood as Walter Tattersall

Episode chronology
← Previous "It Girl"	Next → "Them's the Brakes"

"Dislocation" is the second episode of the third season of the American thriller drama television series Yellowjackets. It is the 21st overall episode of the series and was written by story editor Rich Monahan and executive producer Ameni Rozsa, and directed by Bille Woodruff. It aired on Showtime on February 16, 2025, but it was available to stream two days earlier on Paramount+ with Showtime.

The series follows a New Jersey high school girls' soccer team that travels to Seattle for a national tournament in 1996. While flying over Canada, their plane crashes deep in the wilderness, and the surviving team members are left stranded for nineteen months. The series chronicles their attempts to stay alive as some of the team members are driven to cannibalism. It also focuses on the lives of the survivors 25 years later in 2021, as the events of their ordeal continue to affect them many years after their rescue. In the episode, Lottie makes her way back into Shauna's life, while Taissa discovers she might be responsible for a death. Flashbacks depict the team's search for Mari, unaware that Ben has caught her.

According to Nielsen Media Research, the episode was seen by an estimated 0.071 million household viewers and gained a 0.02 ratings share among adults aged 18–49. The episode received generally positive reviews from critics, who praised the themes and cliffhanger, although some criticized the characterization.

== Plot ==
=== Flashbacks ===
After falling in the pit, an injured Mari (Alexa Barajas) asks Ben (Steven Krueger) for help, as her knee has dislocated. Ben guides her through the process, getting her to straighten it up. Despite helping her, he is unwilling to let her get out of the pit, while maintaining that he did not burn down the cabin.

The girls begin a search party for Mari, but Shauna (Sophie Nélisse) refuses to participate. Lottie (Courtney Eaton) also gets Travis (Kevin Alves) to continue using the mushroom tea in order to learn more about the wilderness. During the search party, Misty spies some man-made traps, but Natalie quickly directs her away. Misty suspects that Natalie really knows where Ben is, and she reports her suspicions to Shauna. Ben reluctantly pulls a ladder for Mari but holds her hostage, as he cannot risk her telling the group. He takes Mari to his cave, where she catches him seemingly talking to somebody else.

Shauna moves the grave of her stillborn son to a more private location, but JV team member Melissa (Jenna Burgess) finds it. Melissa tells Shauna that she is sorry for everything that has happened to her but is not afraid of her. Shauna puts a knife to Melissa's throat and threatens her silence, but Melissa kisses her in response. Surprised, Shauna kisses her back.

=== Present day ===
Shauna (Melanie Lynskey) and Jeff (Warren Kole) are surprised when Lottie (Simone Kessell) arrives unannounced at their house, having been released from a psychiatric hospital, but asks to stay with them. They flatly refuse, but Callie (Sarah Desjardins) convinces them in letting her stay for one night, as she needs help. As Shauna and Jeff have to leave for a dinner with Jeff's potential furniture store clients, Shauna calls Misty (Christina Ricci) over to stay with Callie and Lottie.

Taissa (Tawny Cypress) continues taking care of Van (Lauren Ambrose) at her house. Van accidentally steps on a glass, and while Taissa takes cares of her, she still refuses to go to a hospital. Feeling guilt over their dine and dash, Taissa returns to the restaurant to pay the bill. She is shaken upon seeing a memorial for the waiter, who died of a heart attack while pursuing them, and flees when the employees recognize her. Feeling confused, she finds a place where a sermon is held, and decides to light a candle.

While meeting with the potential clients, Shauna is followed into the bathroom, where she is left a cell phone with no caller ID. She then gives it to the restaurant staff. When she returns to the table, the clients get upset that Shauna is not paying attention. This prompts Shauna to insult them and demand Jeff leave with her, causing friction. At home, Lottie tries to appease Misty's guilt by explaining that Natalie's death was meant to happen. They decide to play "truth or dare?" with Callie, but they are unwilling to share details about the wilderness. Callie drugs Misty and bonds with Lottie. When Misty returns home, Walter (Elijah Wood) warns her that they are not truly her friends and only call her when convenient, but Misty rebukes him and kicks him out. Shauna and Jeff return home, with the latter upset with her actions. After he leaves, Shauna nervously calls the restaurant to find out who retrieved the phone.

== Development ==
=== Production ===
The episode was written by story editor Rich Monahan and executive producer Ameni Rozsa, and directed by Bille Woodruff. This marked Monahan's second writing credit, Rozsa's sixth writing credit, and Woodruff's second directing credit.

=== Writing ===
Questioned over introducing Melissa despite not being acknowledged in the previous seasons, Bart Nickerson explained, "I don't think we always knew that at this point in season whatever we'd meet this one. But the idea of turning over more cards down the road had always been built into the show. They [the seasons] take a long time to make, but it feels like it happens fast, too. I guess we knew pretty early in conceiving season three. The driving narrative question of who is on the periphery was built pretty early."

Commenting on the kiss between Shauna and Melissa, Sophie Nélisse said, "I was surprised by that moment just because Shauna is so not in that head space, I feel like. And because she has that attitude of, 'Don't touch me, don't talk to me, leave me alone,' I'm shocked but also not that much because there have been hints of Shauna's sexuality." Jenna Burgess added, "Melissa has a knife to her throat, and she's closer to Shauna than she's ever been. There's this flurry of heightened emotions. I don't think Melissa has anything left to lose. At this point she's scared, but also very intrigued. The stakes are so high."

== Reception ==
=== Viewers ===
The episode was watched by 0.071 million viewers, earning a 0.02 in the 18-49 rating demographics on the Nielsen ratings scale. This means that 0.02 percent of all households with televisions watched the episode. This was a 23% decrease from the previous episode, which was watched by 0.092 million viewers with a 0.02 in the 18-49 demographics.

=== Critical reviews ===
"Dislocation" received generally positive reviews from critics. The review aggregator website Rotten Tomatoes reported a 100% approval rating for the episode, based on 8 reviews.

Jen Lennon of The A.V. Club gave the episode a "B" and wrote, "The first two episodes of season three don't quite reach the highs of the supernatural-tinged mystery in season one, but I appreciate the attempt to course correct after season two with a more grounded approach. I'm suitably intrigued."

Erin Qualey of Vulture gave the episode a 3 star rating out of 5 and wrote, "Um, is it possible that Bad Tai set the cabin fire? This scene was literally the first time I'd ever considered that as an option, but it's starting to feel like that might be what actually happened."

Brynna Arens of Den of Geek wrote, "Toeing the line between terrifying and realistic takes immense skill, and Yellowjackets has once again crafted a season premiere that will keep us guessing what's real and what isn't for the episodes to come." Erik Kain of Forbes wrote, "I adored the spooky score and the 90s' vibes. Now? I feel like we're spinning in circles. Yellowjackets has lost not only that deliciously frightening sense of mystery and creepiness that kept the story humming, but also the humanity that made its characters so compelling to watch."

Esther Zuckerman of The New York Times wrote, "Mari is now trapped with a man who appears to have lost some of himself. If this episode hints that Melissa will see adulthood, it also suggests that Mari may very well not." Melody McCune of Telltale TV gave the episode a 4 star rating out of 5 and wrote, "Who are we when the stakes are life or death? Can we forgive ourselves for what we had to do in survival mode? Few shows like Yellowjackets can successfully tackle these questions while offering a thought-provoking yet respectful deep dive into what trauma does to us."
