= Them's the Brakes =

- Yellowjackets episode
- Episode no.: Season 3 Episode 3
- Directed by: Jonathan Lisco
- Written by: Jonathan Lisco; Ashley Lyle; Bart Nickerson
- Cinematography by: Shasta Spahn
- Editing by: Jeff Israel
- Original air date: February 23, 2025
- Running time: 54 minutes

Guest appearances
- Ella Purnell as Jackie Taylor; Alexa Barajas as Mari; Nia Sondaya as Akilah; Jenna Burgess as Teen Melissa

Episode chronology
← Previous "Dislocation"	Next → "12 Angry Girls and 1 Drunk Travis"

"Them's the Brakes" is the third episode of the third season of the American thriller drama television series Yellowjackets. It is the 22nd overall episode of the series and was written by executive producer Jonathan Lisco and series creators Ashley Lyle and Bart Nickerson, and directed by Lisco. It aired on Showtime on February 23, 2025, but it was available to stream two days earlier on Paramount+ with Showtime.

The series follows a New Jersey high school girls' soccer team that travels to Seattle for a national tournament in 1996. While flying over Canada, their plane crashes deep in the wilderness, and the surviving team members are left stranded for nineteen months. The series chronicles their attempts to stay alive as some of the team members are driven to cannibalism. It also focuses on the lives of the survivors 25 years later in 2021, as the events of their ordeal continue to affect them many years after their rescue. In the episode, Taissa begins to question her purpose, while Lottie continues influencing Callie's actions. Flashbacks depict the group's attempt to find Mari, while the latter is kept captive in Ben's cave.

According to Nielsen Media Research, the episode was seen by an estimated 0.079 million household viewers and gained a 0.01 ratings share among adults aged 18–49. The episode received mixed reviews from critics, who were polarized over the episode's climax.

== Plot ==
=== Flashbacks ===
At the cave, Mari tries to escape by spraying Ben with bear spray, but he uses the spray back on her, and she is unable to escape. After they recover, they both share different experiences over their respective lives and conflicts. After hesitating, he finally decides to release her.

When Mari returns to the group, she claims her injury is due to falling into a hole, but Shauna questions her. Mari finally reveals that Ben saved her and took her to his cave. Shauna decides to go to the cave, with the other girls joining her. As they descend, Shauna, Van and Akilah split up and begin experiencing hallucinations. In Van's vision, she enters a cabin and sits before the fireplace in an airplane seat. When the cabin goes up in flames, she is trapped in her seat by her seatbelt and the hands of Javi, Laura Lee, and the cabin man. In Akilah's vision, she is tending to a farm, but is approached by a talking alpaca, who tells her that "It's gonna get what it wants." She is then swallowed up into the earth. In Shauna's vision, she is floating in a lake and sees a young boy, presumably her son, waving for her on the shore. She tries to swim to him but seemingly cannot move, and is suddenly dragged violently down below the surface.

The three girls' hallucinations converge, and they find themselves in a classroom taught by Lottie, with Jackie in attendance. Jackie throws a slap bracelet around Shauna's neck, causing her to bleed, and Akilah and Van try to take it off. They regain consciousness, having been pulled to safety by Ben, who warns them that the cave is full of some kind of poison gas. Natalie and Taissa arrive and hold Ben at gunpoint, demanding that he come with them.

=== Present day ===
Van visits a doctor, who informs her that her cancer has stopped metastasizing, which is extremely rare for her condition. She tells the news to Taissa, but is shocked when Taissa reveals that the waiter who chased them died from a heart attack. Taissa deduces that the waiter's death was a "sacrifice" needed to save Van.

Shauna meets with Misty, who claims to have new intel. She reluctantly accompanies Misty on a few errands, but while driving, she finds that the brakes suddenly stop working. Shauna avoids cars and pedestrians, eventually managing to stop the car in a field. She blames Misty, who angrily leaves the car. Lottie babysits Callie for the day, helping with errands. Callie takes her clothes shopping, and Lottie gets her to shoplift. That evening they cook together. Shauna tries some of the food, but is shocked that Lottie gave Jackie's necklace to Callie and angrily kicks Lottie out of her house.

While watching a VHS tape with Van, Taissa is shocked to see the Man with No Eyes in a commercial for an ice cream shop. She forces Van to accompany her to the now-closed ice cream parlor, where they find a fox with a dead rabbit staring at them. Van then says, "We know what It wants. It wants more."

== Development ==
=== Production ===
The episode was written by executive producer Jonathan Lisco and series creators Ashley Lyle and Bart Nickerson, and directed by Lisco. This marked Lisco's fourth writing credit, Lyle's sixth writing credit, Nickerson's sixth writing credit, and Lisco's first directing credit.

=== Writing ===
On Jackie's return during Shauna's hallucination, Sophie Nélisse explained, "I think it's just a metaphor that your demons will haunt you forever until you've made peace with it. [Shauna] still holds a lot of grief and a lot of guilt for Jackie's death. She feels extremely responsible, even though it wasn't fully her fault, and she can't forgive herself for those events. So, I think, obviously, the demons keep chasing her is the reason why she also sees her son in her dream."

=== Casting ===
Besides bringing Ella Purnell back for the hallucination sequence, the episode also features a voice cameo by Vincent Pastore (in his final television role before his passing in 2026) who voices a talking llama in Akilah's hallucination. Lisco said, "We wanted that New York Brooklyn mobster type of accent. But it's basically like the llama and the animals that she allegedly loves are delivering this message that these screams are for her — as she gets sucked down into the earth by the very blackberry vines that she's been having a delightful time eating. The signs are not good."

=== Filming ===
Sophie Nélisse explained the process of filming her hallucination sequence, "We shot it in a lake and I had a diver underneath that was holding ropes that were tied to my legs, so I was treading water. So that part of it was shot in the lake, and then whenever I'd go down, they would pull me down really hard."

== Reception ==
=== Viewers ===
The episode was watched by 0.079 million viewers, earning a 0.01 in the 18-49 rating demographics on the Nielsen ratings scale. This means that 0.01 percent of all households with televisions watched the episode. This was a slight increase from the previous episode, which was watched by 0.071 million viewers with a 0.02 in the 18-49 demographics.

=== Critical reviews ===
"Them's the Brakes" received mixed reviews from critics. The review aggregator website Rotten Tomatoes reported a 78% approval rating for the episode, based on 9 reviews.

Jen Lennon of The A.V. Club gave the episode a "C–" and wrote, "You can't just end an episode of television with a massive cliffhanger and then fully ignore it in the next installment — or at least, if you do, it needs to be a lot more skillfully and intentionally executed than “Them's The Brakes,” a frustrating Yellowjackets entry that tests the limits of the Showtime series' mystery box only to find it structurally unsound and in danger of collapsing. Oh, sure, the show gestures at the enigma of the cell phone from “Dislocation” when Shauna accuses Misty of leaving it in the bathroom for her to find, but no one's buying that, right? Misty might have cut Shauna's brakes, but I'm not sure I believe that, either. That's the problem with this episode: Not only is the plot unbelievable, but the show treats the audience like we're dumb. We're not, but this show might be."

Erin Qualey of Vulture gave the episode a 3 star rating out of 5 and wrote, "While this side quest feels like it was pretty unnecessary overall, Van's claim about the wilderness does ring true. The world that the Yellowjackets know is a callous and cruel one, and of course their survivors' guilt would steer them toward believing in an entity that would never be satisfied." Sam Adams of Slate wrote, "We don't need to know what a show's master plan is, but it's crucial to feel that there is one, or at least that the writers are capable of coming up with an explanation that makes everything seem inevitable in retrospect. We don't need to know where we're going, but we need the sense that we’re going somewhere. Otherwise we'll start shaking that mystery box, listening for the rattle until we wonder if there's anything inside it at all."

Brynna Arens of Den of Geek gave the episode a 4 star rating out of 5 and wrote, "Last season featured multiple instances of cannibalism, and yet this still might be the scariest and most unsettling episode in the series thus far in the best possible way. It feels like the Wilderness is making its presence known to us as well, insisting that it’s very real and very hungry. And after watching this episode, I too am ravenous for more." Erik Kain of Forbes wrote, "So I am tempering my expectations even after a strong episode because they've made some big, structural errors with the narrative that I'm just not sure can be entirely overcome even if Season 3 is better than the last. I want to believe, as Mulder always says, but my guard is up. Season 2 was heartbreaking for all the wrong reasons. But I'm willing to keep an open mind for Season 3."

Esther Zuckerman of The New York Times wrote, "This week's episode highlights what has always been the strong suit of Yellowjackets — the ways in which being a teenage girl, or an emotionally stunted grown woman, dovetail with fantastical horror. The fights based on interpersonal drama can feel just as operatic as any hallucinogenic nightmare brought on by a mysterious woodland entity." Melody McCune of Telltale TV gave the episode a 4 star rating out of 5 and wrote, "Yellowjackets Season 3 Episode 3, “Them's the Brakes,” delivers Lynchian dream sequences with a ferocious turn from Melanie Lynskey. It's the strongest episode in Season 3 thus far, cultivating the seeds planted in the double-episode premiere, specifically in the ’90s timeline scenes."
