= How the Story Ends =

- Yellowjackets episode
- Episode no.: Season 3 Episode 9
- Directed by: Ben Semanoff
- Written by: Sarah L. Thompson
- Cinematography by: Shasta Spahn
- Editing by: Kevin D. Ross
- Original air date: April 6, 2025
- Running time: 55 minutes

Guest appearances
- Hilary Swank as Melissa Kaplan (special guest star); Alexa Barajas as Mari; Nia Sondaya as Akilah; Joel McHale as Kodiak; Jenna Burgess as Teen Melissa; Ashley Sutton as Hannah; Elijah Wood as Walter Tattersall

Episode chronology
← Previous "A Normal, Boring Life"	Next → "Full Circle"

"How the Story Ends" is the ninth episode of the third season of the American thriller drama television series Yellowjackets. It is the 28th overall episode of the series and was written by executive producer Sarah L. Thompson, and directed by Ben Semanoff. It aired on Showtime on April 6, 2025, but it was available to stream two days earlier on Paramount+ with Showtime.

The series follows a New Jersey high school girls' soccer team that travels to Seattle for a national tournament in 1996. While flying over Canada, their plane crashes deep in the wilderness, and the surviving team members are left stranded for nineteen months. The series chronicles their attempts to stay alive as some of the team members are driven to cannibalism. It also focuses on the lives of the survivors 25 years later in 2021, as the events of their ordeal continue to affect them many years after their rescue. In the episode, Shauna, Van and Misty debate on what to do with Melissa's situation. Flashbacks depict the group struggling with Shauna's deteriorating state as Shauna forbids anyone from leaving the camp.

According to Nielsen Media Research, the episode was seen by an estimated 0.095 million household viewers and gained a 0.01 ratings share among adults aged 18–49. The episode received positive reviews from critics; while Lauren Ambrose and Liv Hewson received high praise for their performances, critics considered the closure to Van's arc anticlimactic.

== Plot ==
=== Flashbacks ===
Shauna (Sophie Nélisse) refuses to let anyone leave the camp, even grabbing the rifle from Natalie (Sophie Thatcher) and threatening to kill Kodiak (Joel McHale). The group is forced to stay while they discuss how to proceed, but the girls grow frustrated with Shauna.

Growing distrustful of Lottie (Courtney Eaton), Travis (Kevin Alves) builds a spike pit in the forest, hoping to lure and kill her. When he brings her close, he scolds her for trying to prevent the group from leaving. Lottie apologizes, explaining that she simply wanted him to connect with Javi through the Wilderness. She leaves, after stepping on the trap without collapsing through it. After seeing Melissa (Jenna Burgess) talking with Hannah (Ashley Sutton), Shauna insults Melissa. When Melissa fights back, Shauna surprises everyone by shooting at Melissa, almost hitting her in the arm and causing Melissa to urinate.

Unwilling to tolerate Shauna's actions, some of the girls—Gen, Melissa, Mari, Akilah, and Natalie—begin conspiring with Kodiak and Hannah, giving them a knife which they will use to release themselves and flee that night. After releasing themselves, Kodiak and Hannah are held at gunpoint by Shauna, who demands to know who gave them the knife. Hannah impulsively stabs Kodiak in the eye, killing him, and asks Shauna to let her stay. The girls inform Natalie about the events, realizing they will not be able to leave. Natalie begins to cry out of despair, just as snow begins to fall, signaling the beginning of winter. Misty recovers the broken emergency locator beacon and finds its intact antenna that can be used with the sat-phone. Natalie finds her and is shocked that she has the locator beacon.

=== Present day ===
Van (Lauren Ambrose) begins hallucinating conversations with her younger self (Liv Hewson), who compares her journey to the film The Goonies. The young Van injects a substance in her bag, and Van regains consciousness. She decides to get out of her bed and leave the hospital with Taissa (Tawny Cypress) and Misty (Christina Ricci).

Back at the house, Shauna (Melanie Lynskey) forces Melissa (Hilary Swank) to eat her own flesh. Melissa grabs it in her teeth but spits it in Shauna's face. Melissa seizes the opportunity to flee in her car. However, due to low gas, the car stops on the road just as Van, Taissa and Misty drive right by her. Recognizing her, they drive her back to her house. They confront Shauna over her actions, and she explains that she could not have killed Lottie as she went to an animal shelter. She believes Melissa killed her and blames her for locking her in the freezer, but Misty reveals that she knew the freezer malfunctioned and knowingly led Shauna there. Fed up with the situation, Misty leaves and contacts Walter (Elijah Wood), who takes her to his house. As the women wonder what to do next, Melissa shuts the flue on the fireplace without anyone watching.

At Walter's house Misty uses a trick to get Walter to leave momentarily, allowing her to look at Lottie's cloned phone. Scrolling through pictures, she is shocked by something and immediately leaves the house.

When Van returns to Melissa's house, she finds that Taissa and Shauna fell unconscious due to carbon monoxide poisoning. She takes them outside, with Taissa hallucinating another encounter with the "Other Tai", finally winning. Taissa regains consciousness and they proclaim their love for one another. Van then re-enters the house, deciding that she must kill Melissa in order to live and appease "It". Nevertheless, she is unable to go through with it and Melissa comforts her. However, Melissa grabs the knife and fatally stabs Van in the chest. She flees the house just as Taissa and Shauna enter, with Taissa devastated over Van's body. Van finds herself in the plane with her younger self, explaining that despite her death this is not the end.

== Development ==
=== Production ===
The episode was written by executive producer Sarah L. Thompson, and directed by Ben Semanoff. This marked Thompson's seventh writing credit, and Semanoff's third directing credit.

=== Writing ===
Director Ben Semanoff explained Melissa's decision to kill Van, "I think she wanted to be back in the game, and now she's essentially being chased through the woods again, had she pulled the card. That's the reason for me. I love how that all happened, and that's why I think she stabs her at the end. This is the game. This is what you do."

Liv Hewson and Lauren Ambrose wanted to work together on screen, and pitched the idea of Van talking with her younger self in the opening sequence, with Hewson commenting "The framing device of the younger and older counterparts talking to each other already exists as a narrative device in the show, so there was precedent. We thought it would be meaningful for Van and selfishly, we just wanted to work together." Hewson explained, "it was really sad, and it sort of reminded me that the show is really sad. It was so confronting initially, and then I was like, “Right, the show is sad. That's right, I forgot. OK, yeah, makes sense.”" Hewson also added, "I went through a little grief process of my own as we were filming season 3, and it was just really important to me that we do it to the fullest and that Lauren and I were able to give it our all in saying goodbye to this character."

Ambrose was informed of the fate of her character at the beginning of the season; while the writers did not disclose how the character would be written out, she hoped it would feel "earned", saying "if you're going to have this person succumb to their mortality, finally, it should be earned. I guess that was sort of a big discussion of how that would go down." Tawny Cypress was not content with the decision, saying "When I read it, it did not feel earned, quite honestly, and I didn't really understand it. Now I see that we're saying goodbye to one character but introducing another character. It's the most gruesome way to start [Melissa's] story, so I get why they did it. But as a fan, I'd have liked it to have gone differently for sure — and as a fan of Lauren, I would have liked for her to stick around."

== Reception ==
=== Viewers ===
The episode was watched by 0.095 million viewers, earning a 0.01 in the 18-49 rating demographics on the Nielsen ratings scale. This means that 0.01 percent of all households with televisions watched the episode. This was a slight increase from the previous episode, which was watched by 0.094 million viewers with a 0.01 in the 18-49 demographics.

=== Critical reviews ===
"How the Story Ends" received mixed reviews. The review aggregator website Rotten Tomatoes reported a 71% approval rating for the episode, based on 7 reviews with a 6.6/10 average rating.

Jen Lennon of The A.V. Club gave the episode a "C" and wrote, "When it played out onscreen, I initially reacted to the shock of what just happened, not the sadness I felt at Van's death. Ben's death evoked both of those feelings at the same time. By drawing such strong parallels between the two death scenes, one was bound to be compared unfavorably to the other, and Van's death feels like a cheap knock-off of Ben's."

Erin Qualey of Vulture gave the episode a 3 star rating out of 5 and wrote, "Sorry not sorry, but this little reverie is anticlimactic, and the entire Tai-not-Tai plotline was a huge, unnecessary snooze. In fact, Van's entire arc this season was pretty lame. This episode attempts to wrap all of the nothing up in a nice bow, but despite Lauren Ambrose's best efforts to sell what's happening, it all verges on the nonsensical and, even worse, boring."

Samantha Graves of Collider wrote, "The episode doesn't pull any punches, giving us plenty of drama in both timelines and two shocking deaths, honoring the promise that Season 3 would be Yellowjackets' most fatal season yet." Erik Kain of Forbes wrote, "Even this season, we had the pretty wild visit to the ice cream parlor, the weird commercial with the Man With No Eyes, the creepy voice message you could listen to if you called the phone number in the commercial. So many clues and breadcrumbs leading... nowhere. Nothing has been done with any of this for the rest of the season and now Adult Van is dead. What a waste."

Esther Zuckerman of The New York Times wrote, "The conclusion to Van's story line is messy, but so is The Goonies. In many ways, that makes it the perfect reference for Teen Van, who is stuck in adolescence. It also fits with the general tone of this episode, which is all over the place, offering shocking twists that also seem strangely disappointing." Melody McCune of Telltale TV gave the episode a 4 star rating out of 5 and wrote, "Yellowjackets Season 3 Episode 9, “How the Story Ends,” sees tensions escalate between the adults while the teens splinter into factions. It's an engrossing penultimate episode that deftly lays the groundwork for the season finale. “How the Story Ends” also adds to this season's already high body count, proving that, especially in the present timeline, nobody is safe."
