= 12 Angry Girls and 1 Drunk Travis =

- Yellowjackets episode
- Episode no.: Season 3 Episode 4
- Directed by: Jennifer Morrison
- Written by: Julia Bicknell; Terry Wesley
- Cinematography by: Michael Wale
- Editing by: Genevieve Butler
- Original air date: March 2, 2025
- Running time: 58 minutes

Guest appearances
- Ella Purnell as Jackie Taylor; Alexa Barajas as Mari; Nia Sondaya as Akilah; Jenna Burgess as Teen Melissa; Jeff Holman as Randy Walsh

Episode chronology
← Previous "Them's the Brakes"	Next → "Did Tai Do That?"

"12 Angry Girls and 1 Drunk Travis" is the fourth episode of the third season of the American thriller drama television series Yellowjackets. It is the 23rd overall episode of the series and was written by co-executive producer Julia Bicknell and Terry Wesley, and directed by Jennifer Morrison. It aired on Showtime on March 2, 2025, but it was available to stream two days earlier on Paramount+ with Showtime.

The series follows a New Jersey high school girls' soccer team that travels to Seattle for a national tournament in 1996. While flying over Canada, their plane crashes deep in the wilderness, and the surviving team members are left stranded for nineteen months. The series chronicles their attempts to stay alive as some of the team members are driven to cannibalism. It also focuses on the lives of the survivors 25 years later in 2021, as the events of their ordeal continue to affect them many years after their rescue. In the episode, Jeff gets Shauna to help at Misty's retirement home to overcome "karma", while Taissa and Van consider a new sacrifice. Flashbacks depict the group's capture of Ben, and a trial to determine if he burned the cabin.

According to Nielsen Media Research, the episode was seen by an estimated 0.058 million household viewers and gained a 0.01 ratings share among adults aged 18–49. The episode received mostly positive reviews from critics, who praised the flashbacks sequences, performances and surprise ending.

== Plot ==
=== Flashbacks ===
The girls bring Ben (Steven Krueger) into their camp. Shauna (Sophie Nélisse), Melissa (Jenna Burgess), and others want to punish Ben for burning the cabin, but Natalie (Sophie Thatcher) feels that Ben deserves a chance to defend himself. They subsequently decide to hold a trial for Ben, appointing Misty (Sammi Hanratty) as his defender, Taissa (Jasmin Savoy Brown) as the prosecutor, and Natalie as the judge.

The girls try to paint Ben as uncaring and signal that he is responsible for burning down the cabin, with Shauna testifying that he did not help her at all during her child's birth. Misty defends him by pointing out that everyone had a motive to burn the cabin, with Lottie expressing reasonable doubt. As a last tactic, Shauna tells Taissa that Natalie knew where Ben was staying. Taissa summons Natalie for interrogation, exposing Natalie's knowledge and accusing her of trying to get Ben back with a fixed trial. Natalie confesses, believing that she simply wanted to leave Ben on his own.

Desperate, Misty names Ben himself as her last witness. Ben testifies, defending himself, apologizing to Shauna and the team for abandoning them when they needed him, and calling himself out for his cowardice. With the trial over, everyone except Natalie, Taissa, and Misty are asked to vote. Only Shauna, Melissa, and Van (Liv Hewson) find Ben guilty, while the other six vote for his innocence. However, per their agreement, Ben can only be found innocent if two thirds vote in his favor, and one of the girls abstained from voting. After failing to come to a conclusion, Shauna angrily maintains that Ben burned the cabin and they could have died. Lottie (Courtney Eaton), Travis (Kevin Alves), Akilah (Nia Sondaya), and another girl change their votes, reaching the two thirds for conviction. Fighting tears, Natalie declares Ben guilty.

Shortly after the trial, Travis hands Lottie an etching on a piece of bark that depicts three bodies gathered around one body, which he simply describes as "the outcome."

=== Present day ===
Shauna (Melanie Lynskey) takes her car to a shop, where she is surprised to learn her brakes were never cut; it was simply a brake booster failure. Jeff (Warren Kole) believes this is a result of karma and tries to make amends through good deeds, such as looking for a long-lost cat. He signs them up to volunteer at the retirement home where Misty (Christina Ricci) works. Misty is disappointed that Shauna is not there to apologize, but gleefully assigns her to the kitchens, in which she is locked in the freezer. As Jeff takes well to hosting a bingo game, Shauna imagines Jackie (Ella Purnell), who mocks her, having died in the cold. (Note: As seen in Sic Transit Gloria Mundi.") She is freed by Randy Walsh, Jeff's friend who works there, and immediately suspects Misty, but she had already left a few hours ago. That night she impulsively adopts a cat, telling Jeff they can give hope to the lost cat's owners by passing it off as the same.

Lottie (Simone Kessell) practices an apology speech to an unknown person. Taissa (Tawny Cypress) phones Lottie but is dismissed out of hand. Taissa tests the Wilderness by planting a Queen of Hearts card for a random passerby to choose. A man picks up the card, so she and a reluctant Van (Lauren Ambrose) stalk him to his apartment. At the threshold of his door, Van has second thoughts. Taissa argues that the Wilderness will prolong Van's cancer, but Van maintains she does not want to live this way. Taissa is convinced to spare the man and spontaneously arranges a surprise horse-and-carriage ride date they once dreamed of. At the date, Van's hand is shaking.

Having spent most of her time at the retirement home looking for nonexistent clues left by Walter, Misty receives a text directing her to the Citizen Detective forum, where she finds an image of Lottie dead at the bottom of a flight of stairs.

== Development ==
=== Production ===
The episode was written by co-executive producer Julia Bicknell and Terry Wesley, and directed by Jennifer Morrison. This marked Bicknell's second writing credit, Wesley's first writing credit, and Morrison's first directing credit. Morrison met with producer Drew Comins, who offered her a chance to direct an episode for the season. To prepare for the episode, Morrison rewatched 12 Angry Men for inspiration.

=== Writing ===
The episode features the death of Lottie in the present day storyline. Executive producer Jonathan Lisco explained the decision, "This will tell audiences there are true consequences to our characters' actions and that things actually matter. If the bodies don't drop in this manner, in a way that's embedded and wrapped around story, then what are we doing?" Simone Kessell was informed of the decision before the season started, while working on Montreal, remarking "I still don't know why they made that decision." She expressed sadness with leaving the show, saying "I was a bit shocked because also the character of Lottie is so unique and she's so different." She also added, "I just felt it was premature because I wanted to see — and I know that the fans and the supporters of the show did too — where Lottie was going. So to have that just cut off didn't feel good."

Regarding whether Ben burned the cabin or not, Steven Krueger said, "it doesn't really matter whether he burned the cabin down or not. It's like all of the domino effects that happen based on people thinking that he did or thinking that he didn't, it's just the through line that allows the dynamics to happen that ultimately, lead to all the crazy s–t that goes down." Sophie Nélisse commented, "I think Shauna sees this as an opportunity to regain power. Not that she doesn't care so much about the trial, but I don't think she's quite grasping the scope of what she's doing and understanding the ramifications of what this might imply."

Warren Kole was delighted with Jeff's storyline, "In this episode, we start to get into Jeff having a growth mindset as opposed to this fixed mindset that everything is happening from outside forces. He wants to fix things — and he's getting more and more desperate. He's venturing into metaphysical realms of karma and karmic debt, and he just wants to get back to some familiar streets in his life. He's willing to try anything. So maybe we can just start doing good things and good things will happen as opposed to repeatedly walking into danger every corner that we turn here."

== Reception ==
=== Viewers ===
The episode was watched by 0.058 million viewers, earning a 0.01 in the 18-49 rating demographics on the Nielsen ratings scale. This means that 0.01 percent of all households with televisions watched the episode. This was a 27% decrease from the previous episode, which was watched by 0.079 million viewers with a 0.01 in the 18-49 demographics.

=== Critical reviews ===
"12 Angry Girls and 1 Drunk Travis" received mostly positive reviews from critics. The review aggregator website Rotten Tomatoes reported an 89% approval rating for the episode, based on 9 reviews, with an average rating of 7.8/10.

Jen Lennon of The A.V. Club gave the episode an "A–" and wrote, "“12 Angry Girls And 1 Drunk Travis” is easily the best episode of this season so far. It centers the deliciously captivating teen drama, which has consistently been the show's greatest strength, and builds upon the series' established thesis that the source of whatever's going on in the wilderness — whether it's supernatural or a collective delusion — doesn't matter: Only the resulting power, and how it affects whomever it attaches itself to, does. And a trial is a perfect way to explore that shifting power dynamic."

Erin Qualey of Vulture gave the episode a 4 star rating out of 5 and wrote, "The idea of karmic retribution has informed the overarching storyline of the series for the entirety of its run. But, as we're learning, the wilderness needs sacrifices, and it doesn't really care how it gets them. From what we know so far, “It” is a capricious god, taking what it wants, no matter what the cost. In that way, “It” is kind of like a vengeful teenage girl." Erik Kain of Forbes wrote, "I was about to type “Hopefully we get some answers soon” but I'm honestly not sure that any answers to any of these questions will really be satisfying at this point, simply because so many threads have been dropped, so many others make no sense, and the entire tone and tenor of the show has changed so radically from Season 1 that it just doesn't feel like the same terrifying series we fell in love with in the first place. It's all such a huge shame."

Brynna Arens of Den of Geek gave the episode a 4 star rating out of 5 and wrote, "This episode is all about foreshadowing, connecting dots, and setting up another big mystery. And while these are all things that Yellowjackets episodes have done before, “12 Angry Girls and 1 Drunk Travis” still manages to keep us engaged and on the edge of our seats, eager to see what may befall these survivors next, in the past and in the present." Samantha Graves of Collider wrote, "Her eyes are wide open, but she's unmoving; she's dead, and tragically so. But who killed her? She was hardly around this week, and when we did see her it was in suspicious little glimpses. All we know is that the pool of surviving Yellowjackets is getting smaller and smaller."

Esther Zuckerman of The New York Times wrote, "It's unclear what they plan to do with Ben if they find him guilty, but death is surely on the table. And yet, they also seem like kids playing dress up — which they are. As is familiar for Yellowjackets, childlike behavior and real stakes make for a potent concoction." Melody McCune of Telltale TV gave the episode a 3.5 star rating out of 5 and wrote, "Yellowjackets Season 3 Episode 4, “12 Angry Girls and 1 Drunk Travis,” sees the survivors bring one of their own to justice while the Sadeckis try on charity for size. It's not as strong as last week's Lynchian homage, but the startling cliffhangers in both timelines, particularly for the adults, will undoubtedly pave the narrative road for the remainder of the season."
