= Did Tai Do That? =

- Yellowjackets episode
- Episode no.: Season 3 Episode 5
- Directed by: Jeffrey W. Byrd
- Written by: Sarah L. Thompson; Elise Brown
- Cinematography by: Shasta Spahn
- Editing by: Kevin D. Ross
- Original air date: March 9, 2025
- Running time: 55 minutes

Guest appearances
- Alexa Barajas as Mari; Nia Sondaya as Akilah; Jenna Burgess as Teen Melissa; Michael St. John Smith as Mr. Matthews; Rukiya Bernard as Simone Abara; Aiden Stoxx as Sammy Abara-Turner; Elijah Wood as Walter Tattersall

Episode chronology
← Previous "12 Angry Girls and 1 Drunk Travis"	Next → "Thanksgiving (Canada)"

"Did Tai Do That?" is the fifth episode of the third season of the American thriller drama television series Yellowjackets. It is the 24th overall episode of the series and was written by executive producer Sarah L. Thompson and story editor Elise Brown, and directed by executive producer Jeffrey W. Byrd. It aired on Showtime on March 9, 2025, but it was available to stream two days earlier on Paramount+ with Showtime.

The series follows a New Jersey high school girls' soccer team that travels to Seattle for a national tournament in 1996. While flying over Canada, their plane crashes deep in the wilderness, and the surviving team members are left stranded for nineteen months. The series chronicles their attempts to stay alive as some of the team members are driven to cannibalism. It also focuses on the lives of the survivors 25 years later in 2021, as the events of their ordeal continue to affect them many years after their rescue. In the episode, Shauna, Misty and Walter investigate Lottie's death. Flashbacks depict the group's decision on how to execute Ben.

According to Nielsen Media Research, the episode was seen by an estimated 0.058 million household viewers and gained a 0.01 ratings share among adults aged 18–49. The episode received generally positive reviews from critics, who praised the episode's humor, although some criticized the pacing and lack of momentum.

== Plot ==
=== Flashbacks ===
After declaring Ben (Steven Krueger) guilty, the group debates on how to proceed with the punishment. They settle on a firing squad-style execution, deciding that whoever draws the King of Hearts card should shoot him. Taissa (Jasmin Savoy Brown) draws the card, much to her chagrin.

Misty (Sammi Hanratty) delivers food to a captive Ben, revealed to be his last meal. Misty breaks down, lamenting that she could not save him. Lottie (Courtney Eaton) and Travis (Kevin Alves) take Akilah (Nia Sondaya) back to Ben's cave, persuading her that she must connect with "It". Akilah experiences an hallucination, where Ben's body is enlarged and set out as a bridge between two cliffs. She explains to Lottie and Travis that despite the experience, she was feeling hope.

Taissa struggles with the idea of pulling the trigger, so Van (Liv Hewson) encourages Tai to connect with "other Tai" to make it easier. Despite their attempts, Taissa is unable to do it. That night, the group takes Ben to a tree, where they cover his head. As Taissa prepares to shoot, Lottie and Travis interrupt them. Lottie explains that they need him, based on Akilah's vision. The girls send Ben back to his confinement, where he is visited by Shauna and Melissa (Jenna Burgess). Shauna convinces Melissa to slit Ben's Achilles tendon, preventing him from running away. The girls are astonished by the act, but Shauna and Melissa walk into a hut holding hands.

=== Present day ===
After confirming Lottie's body in the morgue, Misty (Christina Ricci) tells Shauna (Melanie Lynskey), Taissa (Tawny Cypress), and Van (Lauren Ambrose) that she has died. Shauna immediately suspects Misty might have been involved, given that she was gone from work for hours, suspecting that she tried to avenge Natalie's death. Misty angrily dismisses the accusation and throws them out of her house.

While tailing Misty's car, Shauna is stalked by another driver, who is revealed to be Walter (Elijah Wood). He has decided to investigate Lottie's death through Citizen Detective and convinces Shauna to join him. Misty investigates the crime scene, connecting it to Lottie's father (Michael St. John Smith). She visits Mr. Matthews at his house, who is experiencing dementia. To her surprise, Shauna and Walter are already there, pretending to be technicians. Misty reluctantly cooperates, and they find Lottie's cell phone, along with a $50,000 bank withdrawal. Shauna checks Lottie's room, when Mr. Matthews walks in, mistaking her for Lottie's younger self. Shauna plays along with it, leaving Mr. Matthews happy.

Taissa and Van have an awkward reunion with Simone (Rukiya Bernard) and Sammy (Aiden Stoxx). Sammy asks Taissa if she is still his "mommy", to which she replies, "I'll always be your mommy, no matter what." This causes Sammy to back away from Taissa. Tai suggests to Van that they pursue a "change of scenery".

== Development ==
=== Production ===
The episode was written by executive producer Sarah L. Thompson and story editor Elise Brown, and directed by executive producer Jeffrey W. Byrd. This marked Thompson's sixth writing credit, Brown's first writing credit, and Byrd's second directing credit.

=== Writing ===
Tawny Cypress offered her own interpretation of Taissa's other side, "I also think about Other Tai as being like this puppet, with Tai like a master puppeteer that didn't pick up the puppet for like 25 years. So they pick up the puppet again after all these years, and it's kind of wonky. They don't know how to make the mouth go, they forget how to make an arm go like that or whatever. So it looks and sounds a little wonky, but as they get to know the puppet again, their master, it comes back to them, and all of a sudden they're just twirling strings and the puppet's doing anything they want. That's how I look at it."

== Reception ==
=== Viewers ===
The episode was watched by 0.058 million viewers, earning a 0.01 in the 18-49 rating demographics on the Nielsen ratings scale. This means that 0.01 percent of all households with televisions watched the episode. This was steady with the previous episode, which was watched by 0.058 million viewers with a 0.01 in the 18-49 demographics.

=== Critical reviews ===
"Did Tai Do That?" received generally positive reviews from critics. The review aggregator website Rotten Tomatoes reported a 100% approval rating for the episode, based on 9 reviews, with an average rating of 6.4/10.

Jen Lennon of The A.V. Club gave the episode a "B–" and wrote, "It's not what one would call traditionally “good” writing, but you have to admire the show for taking a swing. Maybe it's time to acknowledge that Yellowjackets is rapidly moving from prestige TV to full-on camp, and if “Did Tai Do That?” is any indication, it's a surprisingly viable pivot."

Erin Qualey of Vulture gave the episode a 3 star rating out of 5 and wrote, "After pulling their Annie Wilkes stunt, they celebrate like megalomaniacs as their captive screams into the night. Some teens swap class rings to solidify their relationship, but Melissa and Shauna seal the deal by mutilating their soccer coach. They didn't kill Ben, but I'm betting he's going to wish he were dead very soon." Samantha Graves of Collider wrote, "Lottie's death is arguably the most shocking moment of Episode 4, and though it's clear the circumstances behind it will gradually be revealed, it seems the present-day characters are bent on finding out what happened. The real star of the series this week, however, is the Coach Scott storyline. Now that he's been sentenced to death, he's a sitting duck as the team struggles to come to terms with their decision."

Esther Zuckerman of The New York Times wrote, "The contrast between the darkness of the circumstances and the silliness of the analogy is jarring, but so is the entire episode, which jolts back and forth between horror in the ’90s and quirky caper in the 2020s." Melody McCune of Telltale TV gave the episode a 3 star rating out of 5 and wrote, "Overall, it's a bit weaker than last week's fare, with the teen timeline really fueling the story."
