= Ashley Lyle and Bart Nickerson =

American screenwriter and producer duo

Ashley Lyle and Bart Nickerson are an American screenwriting and producing duo. Lyle and Nickerson, a married couple, are best known for creating and executive producing the Showtime drama series Yellowjackets.

== Biography ==
Lyle was born in New Jersey and grew up in Belmar, New Jersey. She graduated from Lawrenceville School and received her B.A. and MFA from Columbia University. Nickerson hails from Monmouth County, New Jersey, having been raised in Middletown Township, New Jersey. The couple met on the East Coast and moved to Los Angeles in 2007 with the intention of becoming TV writers. They landed their first job writing for The Originals.

Lyle and Nickerson also wrote for other TV shows such as Narcos and Dispatches from Elsewhere.

In 2022, Lyle and Nickerson were nominated for the Writers Guild of America Award for Television: New Series and Writers Guild of America Award for Television: Dramatic Series for creating the Showtime series Yellowjackets. In August 2022, they signed an overall deal with Showtime. Successor company Paramount Television Studios renewed the deal in 2026.

== Filmography ==
Year	Title	Credited as			Notes
Year	Title	Writers	Directors	Executive producers	Notes
2013–2016	The Originals	Yes	No	No	Wrote 11 episodes Also story editors and executive story editors
2017	Narcos	Yes	No	Co-producers	Wrote: "MRO"
2018	Narcos: Mexico	Yes	No	Consulting	Wrote 2 episodes
2020	Dispatches from Elsewhere	Yes	No	Co-Executive	Wrote 3 episodes
2021–present	Yellowjackets	Yes	Nickerson	Yes	Also creators, wrote 6 episodes Directed 3 episodes (only Bart Nickerson)
2023	Celebrity Family Feud	No	No	No	Contestant (only Ashley Lyle)
