= Warren Kole =

American actor

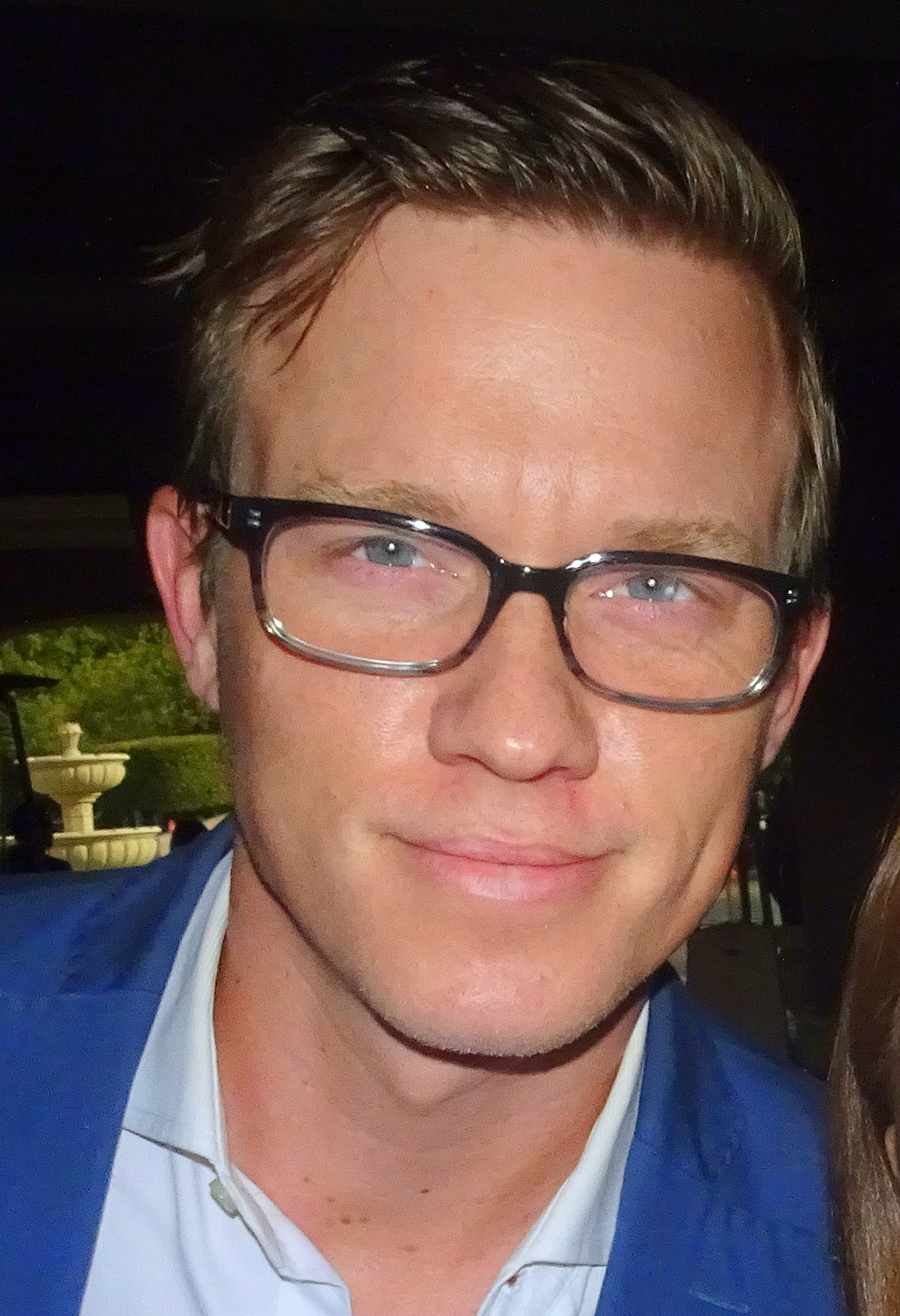
- Kole in 2015
- Born: Warren David Blosjo Jr. September 23, 1977 (age 49); San Antonio, Texas, U.S.
- Education: Boston University (BFA)
- Occupation: Actor
- Years active: 2004–present

Warren David Blosjo Jr., (born September 23, 1977) known professionally as Warren Kole, is an American actor. He is known for his role as LAPD Detective Wes Mitchell on the USA Network original series Common Law. He also played Roderick on the FOX original series The Following in its first season, and starred as FBI Agent Robert Stahl in the NBC crime drama Shades of Blue. Since 2021, he has had a main role in Showtime's Yellowjackets as the character Jeff Sadecki. He also portrayed Rafe Adler in the video game Uncharted 4: A Thief's End and Commander Phillip Graves in 2022's Call of Duty: Modern Warfare II and 2023's Call of Duty: Modern Warfare III, and he reprises the character in Call of Duty: Warzone and 2026's Call of Duty: Modern Warfare 4.

== Early life ==
Warren Kole was born in San Antonio, Texas, and spent much of his early life in the Washington, D.C. area. He studied acting at Boston University in Massachusetts where he began his career performing in local theater productions.

== Career ==
Kole made his feature film debut in A Love Song for Bobby Long opposite John Travolta, Scarlett Johansson, and fellow USA Network star, Gabriel Macht. He also starred as Addley Koffin opposite Rebecca De Mornay and Jaime King in the independent thriller Mother's Day, and he made an appearance in 2012 blockbuster The Avengers. He also had a role in the TV show Rizzoli & Isles. Kole had a recurring role as Roderick on the Fox series The Following.

Prior to his role on Common Law, he had recurring roles on the Fox series The Chicago Code, 24, and Mental. He also had a starring role as Robert Wheeler in the 6-part TNT miniseries Into the West, produced by Steven Spielberg and DreamWorks. He also starred in the "Pick Me Up" episode of Showtime's Masters of Horror anthology series. He appears in the fifth season of the USA Network's White Collar.

In 2016, Kole began a supporting role as FBI Special Agent Robert Stahl on the NBC series Shades of Blue opposite Jennifer Lopez and Ray Liotta. Kole would then later portray Rafe Adler, main antagonist of the 2016 video game Uncharted 4: A Thief's End.

Kole began a series regular role on Showtime's Yellowjackets in 2021.

He portrayed Commander Phillip Graves in 2022's Call of Duty: Modern Warfare II and its sequels.

== Filmography ==
=== Film ===
Year	Title	Role
2004	Company K	Pvt. Jakie Brauer
2004	A Love Song for Bobby Long	Sean
2005	One Last Thing...	Bo
2007	Cougar Club	Marshall Hogan III
2010	Mother's Day	Addley Koffin
2012	The Avengers	Carrier Bridge Tech
2013	Game of Assassins	David Hellar

=== Television ===
Year	Title	Role	Notes
2004	Third Watch	Tommy Shepherd	Episode: "A Call for Help"
2005	Law & Order: Trial by Jury	Justin Birch	Episode: "Truth or Consequences"
2005	Into the West	Robert Wheeler	Miniseries; 2 episodes
2006	Masters of Horror	Walker	Episode: "Pick Me Up"
2007	Medium	Wesley King	Episode: "1-900-Lucky"
2008	CSI: Miami	Russell Brooks	Episode: "You May Now Kill the Bride"
2009	24	Special Agent Brian Gedge	6 episodes
2009	Mental	Rylan Moore	5 episodes
2009	Cold Case	Grady Giles '09	Episode: "Hood Rats"
2009	NCIS: Los Angeles	Air Force Capt. Mark Holden Briggs	Episode: "Predator"
2010	Rizzoli & Isles	Sumner Fairfield	Episode: "Money for Nothing"
2011	The Chicago Code	Ray Bidwell	5 episodes
2012	Common Law	Wes Mitchell	Main role
2013	The Following	Tim "Roderick" Nelson	6 episodes
2013	Person of Interest	Ian Murphy	Episode: "Lady Killer"
2013	White Collar	David Siegel	2 episodes
2014–2015	Stalker	Detective Trent Wilkes	5 episodes
2016–2018	Shades of Blue	FBI Special Agent Robert Stahl	Main role
2016	Blue Bloods	Officer Thomas Sculley	Episode: "Blast from the Past"
2020	68 Whiskey	Cameron	Episode: "Fight or Flight"
2020	The Wilds	Dave Goodkind	Episode: "Day Sixteen"
2021	Why Women Kill	Detective Rowbin	4 episodes
2021–present	Yellowjackets	Jeff Sadecki	Main role
2022	The Terminal List	NCIS Special Agent Josh Holder	2 episodes

=== Video games ===
Year	Title	Role
2016	Uncharted 4: A Thief's End	Rafe Adler
2022	Call of Duty: Modern Warfare II	Commander Phillip Graves
2023	Call of Duty: Warzone 2.0	Commander Phillip Graves
2023	Call of Duty: Modern Warfare III	Commander Phillip Graves
2026	Call of Duty: Modern Warfare 4	Commander Phillip Graves
