= Yellowjackets season 1 =

Season of television series

Yellowjackets
- Season 1
- Promotional poster
- Starring: Melanie Lynskey; Tawny Cypress; Ella Purnell; Sophie Nélisse; Jasmin Savoy Brown; Sophie Thatcher; Sammi Hanratty; Steven Krueger; Warren Kole; Christina Ricci; Juliette Lewis
- No. of episodes: 10

Release
- Original network: Showtime
- Original release: November 14, 2021 – January 16, 2022

Season chronology
- Next → Season 2

The first season of the American thriller drama television series Yellowjackets premiered on Showtime on November 14, 2021. Series creators Ashley Lyle and Bart Nickerson serve as the showrunners for the season, alongside executive producer Jonathan Lisco. The series is centered on the teenage survivors of a 1996 plane crash in the wilderness. The narrative is set in dual timelines: the first follows the teens in 1996 as they must learn to survive in the wild after the crash, while the second takes place 25 years later and focuses on the survivors' attempts to piece their lives back together after being rescued and returning to civilization. The ensemble cast includes Sophie Nélisse, Jasmin Savoy Brown, Sophie Thatcher, and Sammi Hanratty as the core teenage survivors, while Melanie Lynskey, Tawny Cypress, Juliette Lewis, and Christina Ricci portray their adult counterparts.

In September 2019, Showtime gave Yellowjackets a pilot order and filming commenced in Los Angeles that November. In December 2020, the series was picked up for a season order and filming then moved to Vancouver in May 2021, concluding in early October. The season consists of ten episodes and received critical acclaim for its performances, writing, and direction. It was also a ratings success, becoming the second-most streamed series on Showtime behind Dexter: New Blood. Yellowjackets was nominated for six Primetime Emmy Awards, including Outstanding Drama Series. At the 27th Critics' Choice Awards, Lynskey won for Best Actress in a Drama Series.

== Cast ==
=== Main ===
- Melanie Lynskey as Shauna Sadecki, née Shipman
  - Sophie Nélisse as teen Shauna
- Tawny Cypress as Taissa Turner
  - Jasmin Savoy Brown as teen Taissa
- Ella Purnell as Jackie Taylor
- Christina Ricci as Misty Quigley
  - Sammi Hanratty as teen Misty
- Juliette Lewis as Natalie "Nat" Scatorccio
  - Sophie Thatcher as teen Natalie
- Steven Krueger as Ben Scott
- Warren Kole as Jeff Sadecki

=== Recurring ===
- Courtney Eaton as Lottie Matthews
- Liv Hewson as Vanessa "Van" Palmer
- Keeya King as Akilah
- Kevin Alves as Travis Martinez
- Jane Widdop as Laura Lee
- Alexa Barajas as Mari Ibarra
- Rekha Sharma as Jessica Roberts
- Sarah Desjardins as Callie Sadecki
- Rukiya Bernard as Simone Abara
- Luciano Leroux as Javi Martinez
- Aiden Stoxx as Sammy Abara-Turner
- Mya Lowe as Gen
- Peter Gadiot as Adam Martin
- Alex Wyndham as Kevyn Tan

=== Guest ===
- Jack DePew as teen Jeff
- Carlos Sanz as Coach Bill Martinez
- Gabrielle Rose as Mrs. Taylor
- Tonya Cornelisse as Allie Stevens
  - Pearl Amanda Dickson as teen Allie

== Episodes ==
No. overall	No. in season	Title	Directed by	Written by	Original release date	U.S. viewers (millions)
1	1	"Pilot"	Karyn Kusama	Ashley Lyle & Bart Nickerson	November 14, 2021 (Note: The first episode was released for free by Showtime on its platforms and on YouTube on November 6, 2021.)	0.246
A young woman, dressed only in a nightgown, runs in fear through a snow-covered forest. She is killed by falling into a trap, and her body is dragged away by people wearing Yellowjackets t-shirts, animal furs, and masks. She is then slaughtered. In 1996, a New Jersey girls' high-school soccer team, known as the Yellowjackets, achieves a place in a national tournament in Seattle. During practice, Taissa tackles Allie, a freshman player she considers a liability, breaking Allie's leg and ruling her out of the tournament. At a party, Shauna tries to start a fight with Taissa and several of their teammates become involved. Team captain Jackie, Shauna's best friend, intervenes. Shauna secretly has sex with Jackie's boyfriend Jeff. On the day of the trip, the team boards a private plane to Nationals that includes Coach Martinez, Assistant Coach Ben Scott, equipment manager Misty Quigley, and Martinez' two sons, Travis and Javi. During a storm that forces a reroute over Canada, the plane crashes, leaving the survivors stranded in the wilderness. In 2021, Shauna and Jeff are married with a teenage daughter. Jessica Roberts, a fake journalist, offers Shauna a seven-figure book deal if she will reveal the details of what happened in the wilderness. Taissa poses with her wife Simone and their son Sammy for photographs as she launches her campaign for state senator. Misty is employed as a geriatric nurse. Natalie has completed rehab and returns to New Jersey to "reconnect with some old friends".
2	2	"F Sharp"	Jamie Travis	Jonathan Lisco & Ashley Lyle & Bart Nickerson	November 21, 2021	0.168
Misty uses her advanced knowledge of first aid to care for the injured after the plane crash. She saves the life of Ben Scott, the assistant coach, by amputating and cauterizing his mangled leg. Travis discovers his father's dead body impaled on a tree branch. Revelling in the attention and praise her survival skills bring her, Misty destroys the plane's emergency locator beacon after discovering it by chance. In 2021, Shauna and Jeff's marriage therapist advises them to rekindle their relationship by exploring sexual fantasies. Shauna meets an intriguing stranger named Adam after she rear-ends his car, and they exchange information. After Shauna and Jeff have sex, she sees a text message on his phone from a woman who is arranging to meet him the following day when he says he will be working late. Natalie holds Misty at gunpoint in an attempt to find out who sent her a postcard with an ominous symbol from their past. Misty states that she also received the postcard and shows Natalie that she has tracked down Travis with amateur detective work. Misty and Natalie embark on a road trip to find Travis after Misty covertly removes some wiring from Natalie's car. Taissa is concerned about her son Sammy's disturbing drawings that are similar to visions she had in her childhood.
3	3	"The Dollhouse"	Eva Sørhaug	Sarah L. Thompson	November 28, 2021	0.210
Three days following the plane crash, the survivors bury the deceased crash victims. Taissa convinces the group to hike towards a nearby lake. Tensions rise as the group question whether they will be rescued and what their strategy is for survival. The group discovers an abandoned cabin. Lottie feels that something is wrong with the cabin and later discovers its former occupant dead in the attic. In 2021, Taissa's political opponent Phil Bathurst airs a campaign ad insinuating that she is a cannibal. Taissa's concerns for Sammy grow after he purposefully hurts a child at a playground. Shauna follows her husband to a hotel, where she runs into Adam and spots Jeff with another woman. Shauna and Adam go to a hotel room together. Meanwhile, Misty and Natalie go to Travis's home but are arrested for breaking and entering. After they are released, they visit the ranch where he works and find he has hanged himself. His death appears to be a suicide but Natalie believes someone has murdered him.
4	4	"Bear Down"	Deepa Mehta	Liz Phang	December 5, 2021	0.161
The group find a rifle with a plentiful supply of ammunition inside the cabin. Natalie and Travis prove to be best suited to handle the firearm. They bond as they hunt a deer and recover a keepsake ring from the buried body of Travis' father. In a flashback, it is revealed that Natalie's abusive father died in a gun discharge accident during an argument about her best friend Kevyn spending time in her bedroom. The rest of the group finds a functional propeller aircraft. Shauna bonds with Travis's younger brother Javi. In 2021, Natalie runs into an adult Kevyn, now a police officer, and uses his affection for her to entice him to dig into Travis's murder. Misty texts Kevyn, posing as Nat. Taissa rejects an endorsement from a powerful potential donor when she tries to probe into the plane crash. Shauna and Adam begin an intimate affair, enacting Shauna's missed teen fantasies, while Adam is shown to probe for personal information on her. Misty threatens Jessica while following Nat and Kevyn on a date. Misty calls Shauna to tell her that Travis is dead.
5	5	"Blood Hive"	Eva Sørhaug	Ameni Rozsa	December 12, 2021	0.295
Lottie has run out of Loxapine, the medication she takes to manage the symptoms of schizophrenia. Relationships form between Taissa and Van as well as Natalie and Travis. The group holds a seance in the attic where Lottie appears to become possessed. Ben is poisoned by Misty but does not die. In order to get her to leave him alone, Ben deceives Misty by saying he has feelings for her too. After Taissa suspects Shauna's pregnancy, Shauna confesses. In 2021, Taissa finds the word "spill" painted on the front door of her home. She confronts Sammy after discovering a container of paint in his room. Sammy denies painting the word and blames "the lady in the tree". Later, with her political opponent attacks increasing, Taissa contemplates dropping out of the Senate race but decides not to. Shauna attends a Halloween party where she runs into her teenage daughter Callie. The following day, what initially seems like Callie bonding with Shauna ends in Callie unsuccessfully threatening to tell Jeff about Adam. Natalie and Misty gain access to Kevyn's files, and they find the same ominous symbol at the scene of Travis' murder. Natalie calls Taissa to her motel room, telling her what she has learned. Nat calls Shauna to tell her but learn that Misty already informed her. Meanwhile, Misty watches them through a hidden camera.
6	6	"Saints"	Bille Woodruff	Chantelle M. Wells	December 19, 2021	0.289
In a flashback to Lottie's childhood, Lottie distracts her parents seconds before the car traveling in front of them is involved in a fatal accident. Shauna tells Taissa that the baby is Jeff's, Jackie's then-boyfriend. With Taissa's assistance, Shauna tries to perform a self-induced abortion but is unable to go through with it. Lottie begins having hallucinations of a deer. She tells the religious Laura Lee that she is having visions and agrees to be baptized. Later, Natalie and Travis kill a maggot-infested deer. Laura Lee concludes that Lottie is having premonitions. In 2021, Natalie and Taissa tell Shauna what happened to Travis. Taissa's wife, Simone, makes an appointment with a child psychologist who says Sammy is under significant stress. Natalie and Kevyn develop feelings for one another and have sex. Misty kidnaps Jessica. Late at night, Taissa is revealed to be "the lady in the tree".
7	7	"No Compass"	Eva Sørhaug	Katherine Kearns	December 26, 2021	0.327
Taissa, Van, Misty, Akilah, and Mari agree to go on an expedition to find a way out of the wilderness. As they depart, Lottie tells Van that they will encounter a "river of blood" and "red smoke". While walking, the group finds a red-colored river. Later, they are attacked by a pack of wolves. Taissa defends the group using a flare gun, but Van is severely wounded. Meanwhile, Shauna tells Jackie that she is pregnant but lies about who the father is. At night, Jackie reads Shauna's diary. In 2021, Natalie, Shauna, and Taissa agree to pay $50,000 to a blackmailer. After spotting the blackmailer, the group chases them. The blackmailer falls into a box of glitter during the pursuit before getting away. Misty questions Jessica, believing her to be the blackmailer. Jessica reveals she was hired by Taissa to learn about the rest of the group. Back home, Shauna has sex with Adam. In the morning, they are almost caught by Jeff. Kevyn learns that Natalie used his gun but she does not tell him about the blackmailer.
8	8	"Flight of the Bumblebee"	Ariel Kleiman	Cameron Brent Johnson & Liz Phang	January 2, 2022	0.311
After Van regains consciousness, the group returns to the cabin. Natalie and Travis cut off their relationship when he backs out during sex. Natalie talks to Ben, who offers relationship advice and reveals he is gay. Laura Lee announces her desire to fly the abandoned plane out of the wilderness. Upon ascent, however, it explodes. In 2021, Misty stops Natalie from relapsing and reveals the hidden camera in the process. Misty tells Natalie that someone withdrew all the money from Travis's bank account after he died. The next day, Natalie tries to get information out of Suzie, an acquaintance who works in a bank. After Suzie refuses to cooperate, Natalie resorts to blackmail. Taissa tells Simone about her condition in which she becomes an entirely different person at night. Fearing she will hurt Sammy, she begs Simone to leave her alone in the house for a while. Shauna discovers that someone took all of her journals and she finds glitter in her closet. After learning that Adam is not who he says he is, Shauna goes to his apartment to question him.
9	9	"Doomcoming"	Daisy von Scherler Mayer	Ameni Rozsa & Sarah L. Thompson	January 9, 2022	0.419
The group organizes a homecoming party, dubbed "Doomcoming". Everyone except Jackie unknowingly consumes hallucinogenic mushrooms. Jackie and Travis have sex despite Travis saying he still has feelings for Natalie. Ben and Natalie leave the party to talk alone; Misty follows them. After Natalie leaves to find Travis, Ben tells Misty that he is gay. The rest of the group, on a bad trip, decide to confront Jackie at the cabin, leaving Javi alone in the woods. When the group finds Jackie and Travis, they lock Jackie in a closet and try to rape Travis. When he flees, the group chases while howling like wolves. After catching him, Lottie orders Shauna to slit his throat. Natalie arrives and stops her. In 2021, Shauna kills Adam after confirming that he is digging in her past. She remembers back home that Jeff has access to the safe where she keeps her journals. She questions him, and Jeff reveals he blackmailed the group because his furniture store was going out of business. The woman at the hotel was, in fact, a loan shark, and Jeff was not having an affair. Shauna tells Jeff that she killed Adam and they discuss their options. Shauna convinces Natalie and Taissa that Adam was the blackmailer. Natalie asks Misty to dispose of the body.
10	10	"Sic Transit Gloria Mundi" (Note: Sic transit gloria mundi is a Latin phrase that means "Thus passes the glory of the world".)	Eduardo Sánchez	Ashley Lyle & Bart Nickerson	January 16, 2022	0.333
Van begins to believe Lottie has supernatural abilities. Lottie kills a bear that calmly walks in front of her. Travis and Natalie look for Javi, who disappeared after the "Doomcoming" party. Everyone eats while Jackie refuses. She angrily confronts the group for hurting Travis and reveals that she knows Jeff was cheating on her with Shauna, leading to a fight between the two. Jackie is ordered to sleep outside. The next day, to Shauna's horror, they see that it has snowed and Jackie has frozen to death. Lottie, Misty, and Van offer the bear's heart as a tribute to the wilderness. In 2021, Shauna, Taissa, Natalie, and Misty clean up the murder scene. The group attends a 25-year high school reunion. Shauna confronts Jeff's friend Randy, who knows about the blackmail, and threatens to kill him if he tells anyone else. Callie learns of Adam's disappearance in the news. Simone finds the severed head of her dog, Sammy's doll, and what appears to be a human heart in a hidden room in the basement. Misty poisons Jessica, Taissa wins the Senate race, and a mysterious group kidnaps Natalie. Suzie tells Natalie in a voicemail that Lottie is responsible for emptying Travis' bank account.

== Production ==
=== Development ===
Ashley Lyle said the idea for the show was partly inspired by the public reaction in 2017 to a then-planned female-led adaptation of the Lord of the Flies novel, which critics said would never work because of doubts that girls could descend into the same level of barbarism as the boys in the original story. Lyle said one man's comment posited, "What are [the girls] going to do? Collaborate to death?". The thought that came to Lyle in response was, "You were never a teenage girl, sir." Lyle fleshed out the plot with her husband and producing partner Bart Nickerson. The idea was also influenced by the 1972 Andes flight disaster and the 1993 movie inspired from its events, Alive, as well as the Donner Party. The creators said that the primary aim of the series is to explore "the diverse ways in which women approach friendship, adversity, violence and power - both in adolescence and as adults." Nickerson said the decision to set the story in two different timelines, one in the immediate aftermath of the crash and the other many years later, was to "explore trauma as a lens for continued negotiation of the world. We were very captivated by: How does trauma not only shape your view of the past, but how does it also shape the way that you continue to move forward in the world?"

On May 9, 2018, Showtime announced it had acquired the rights to the series. The network gave an order for a pilot episode in September 2019, with Karyn Kusama set to direct. In December 2020, Showtime greenlit a series order. Kusama brought on Jonathan Lisco as a co-showrunner and executive producer.

=== Casting ===
Melanie Lynskey was the first to join the cast. On casting the younger versions of the adult characters, Lyle said she and Nickerson focused less on a physical match and more on a "a kind of energetic similarity, or a kind of soul match". In October 2019, Lynskey, Tawny Cypress, and Jasmine Savoy Brown were announced as series regulars. Juliette Lewis, Christina Ricci, Ella Purnell, Sammi Hanratty, Sophie Thatcher, and Sophie Nélisse joined the cast that November. Nélisse, who plays young Shauna, was one of the last to be cast a week before filming of the pilot began. In preparation for playing the same characters in different timelines, the older and younger actors had conversations about posture, gesture, personality, and tone of voice.

In December 2019, Ava Allan, Courtney Eaton, and Liv Hewson were cast in recurring roles. In June 2021, it was reported Warren Kole, Peter Gadiot, Keeya King, Alex Wyndham, Sarah Desjardins, Kevin Alves, and Alexa Barajas would also star.

=== Filming ===
Filming for the pilot episode took place in Los Angeles in November 2019. Several scenes from the pilot were filmed on the ski slopes of Mammoth Mountain, while some high school-set scenes were filmed in and around John Marshall High School in Los Feliz. Further production on the series was postponed to the spring of 2021 due to the COVID-19 pandemic. Filming restarted in Vancouver, Canada in May 2021. Interior filming, including the plane crash scene, took place at The Bridge Studios in Burnaby. Filming wrapped in October, with the young and older cast taking weekly turns to shoot their scenes.

== Release ==
On November 10, 2021, Yellowjackets had its premiere at the Hollywood Legion Post 43 in Los Angeles. The season premiered on Showtime on November 14, 2021. The first episode was released for free by Showtime on its platforms and on YouTube on November 6, 2021.

=== Home media ===
Showtime released the first season on DVD and manufactured-on-demand Blu-ray on July 19, 2022.

== Reception ==
=== Audience viewership ===
The series premiere was watched by 0.246 million viewers, earning a 0.02 in the 18-49 rating demographics on the Nielsen ratings scale. The ninth and penultimate episode was watched by 1.41 million viewers across all platforms, making it the second-most streamed series in Showtime's history behind Dexter: New Blood. The season finale brought 1.3 million viewers across all platforms. Yellowjackets averaged more than 5 million weekly viewers, the highest for a freshman series on the network since Billions in 2016.

Showtime CEO David Nevins stated that the series was not initially a marketing priority for Showtime, but after he and other executives took note of the online buzz generated by younger women on social media early in the show's run, the network spent more during the course of the show to promote it.

Viewership and ratings per episode of Yellowjackets season 1
No.	Title	Air date	Rating (18–49)	Viewers (millions)	DVR (18–49)	DVR viewers (millions)	Total (18–49)	Total viewers (millions)	Ref.
1	"Pilot"	November 14, 2021	0.02	0.246	—N/a	—N/a	—N/a	—N/a	
2	"F Sharp"	November 21, 2021	0.02	0.168	0.08	0.287	0.10	0.455	
3	"The Dollhouse"	November 28, 2021	0.03	0.210	—N/a	—N/a	—N/a	—N/a	
4	"Bear Down"	December 5, 2021	0.03	0.161	0.08	0.371	0.11	0.532	
5	"Blood Hive"	December 12, 2021	0.06	0.295	—N/a	—N/a	—N/a	—N/a	
6	"Saints"	December 19, 2021	0.06	0.289	—N/a	—N/a	—N/a	—N/a	
7	"No Compass"	December 26, 2021	0.06	0.327	—N/a	—N/a	—N/a	—N/a	
8	"Flight of the Bumblebee"	January 2, 2022	0.06	0.311	—N/a	—N/a	—N/a	—N/a	
9	"Doomcoming"	January 9, 2022	0.08	0.419	—N/a	—N/a	—N/a	—N/a	
10	"Sic Transit Gloria Mundi"	January 16, 2022	0.10	0.333	—N/a	—N/a	—N/a	—N/a	

=== Critical response ===
On the review aggregator website Rotten Tomatoes, the season holds an approval rating of 100% based on 77 reviews. The website's critical consensus reads, "A genre mashup that blends smoothly, Yellowjackets presents an absorbing mystery with plenty of sting." Metacritic, which uses a weighted average, assigned the season a score of 78 out of 100 based on 28 reviews, indicating "generally favorable" reviews.

The first season was met with highly positive reviews from critics, who praised its mix of different genres, ensemble cast, and themes. John Doyle of The Globe and Mail wrote, "It's a blazing start to a series speculating about the dark, seething rage and violence that lurks in young women given the agency to create and control their own society." Phillip Maciak of Slate wrote, "Sometimes [the show is] a haunted-house, political thriller; sometimes it's a cabin-in-the-woods slasher; sometimes it's a semi-satirical feminist suburban revenge comedy; sometimes it's an odd couple, buddy cop, road trip adventure. Whether the show's baseline understanding of itself is in constant, generative flux or in tailspin, Yellowjackets' instability is precisely what makes it so fun to watch week in and week out." In Time, Judy Berman said Yellowjackets "is the rare series whose execution improves upon an already strong premise. Each episode has its puzzles and twists, just as each woman has her secrets, all set up carefully enough to make you wonder why you didn't unravel them sooner." The New York Times' James Poniewozik observed that the show is "not the 'Lord of the Flies' downer you might expect", as "the horror is cut with hormones and mordant humor".

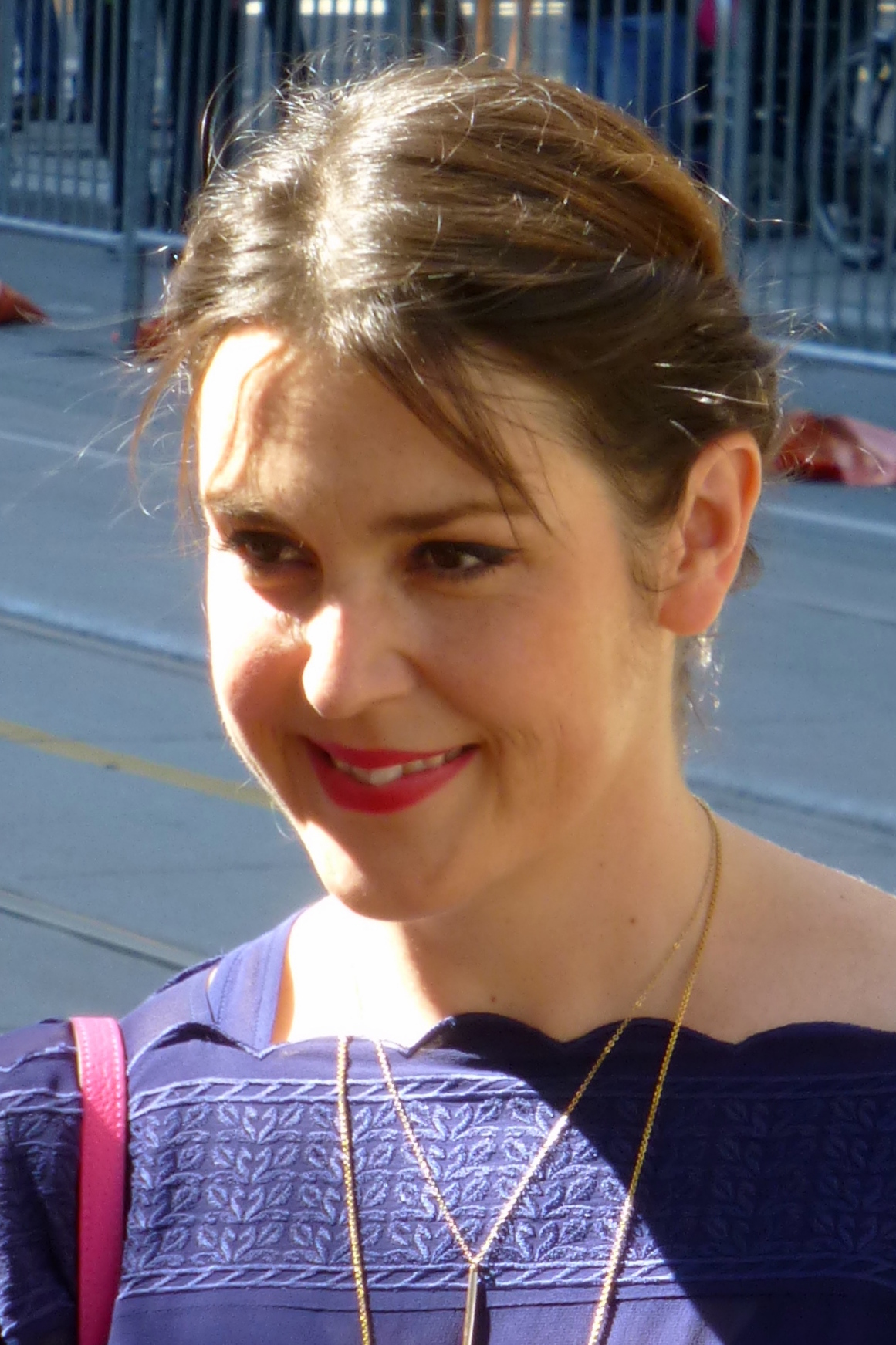
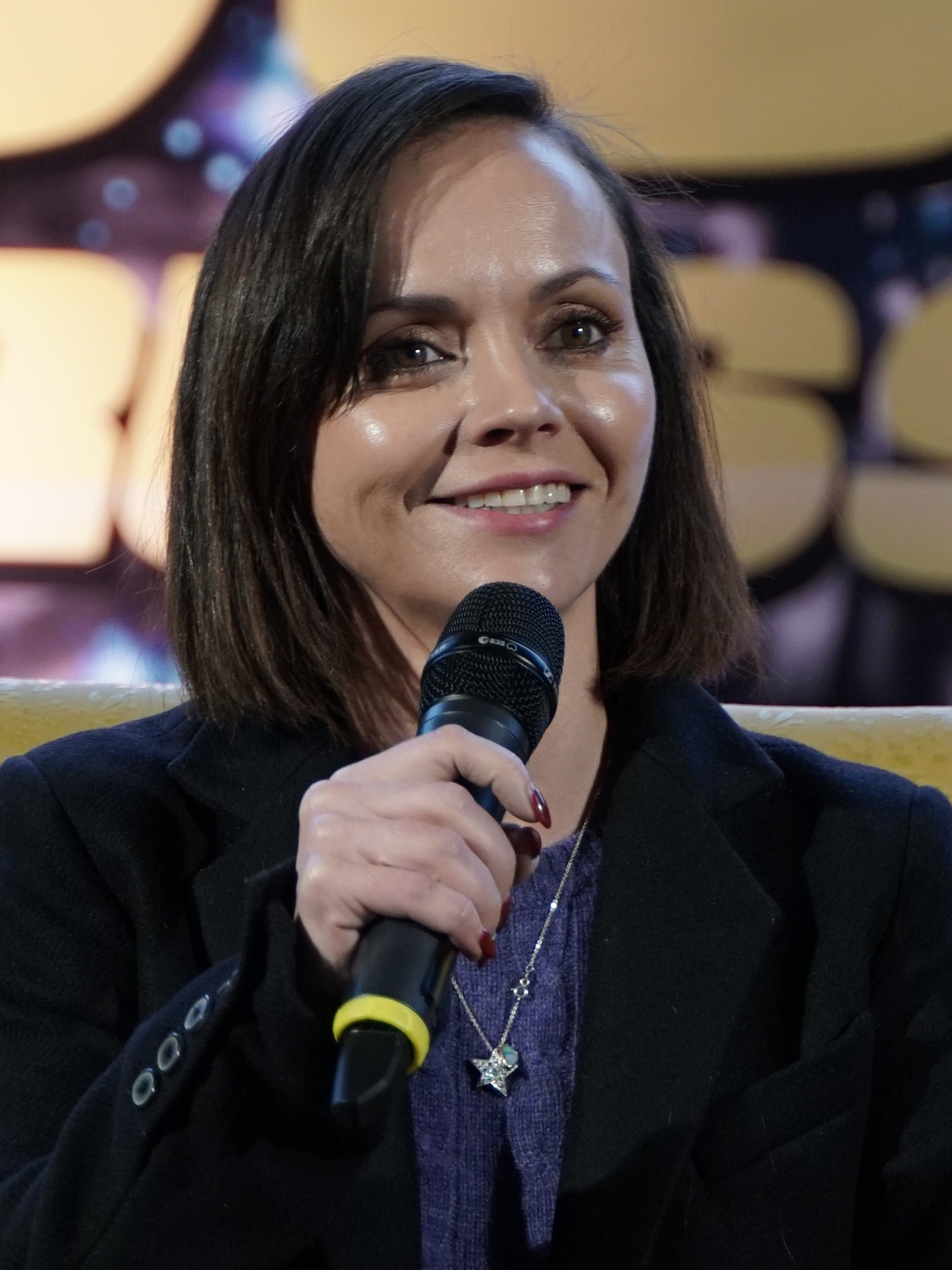
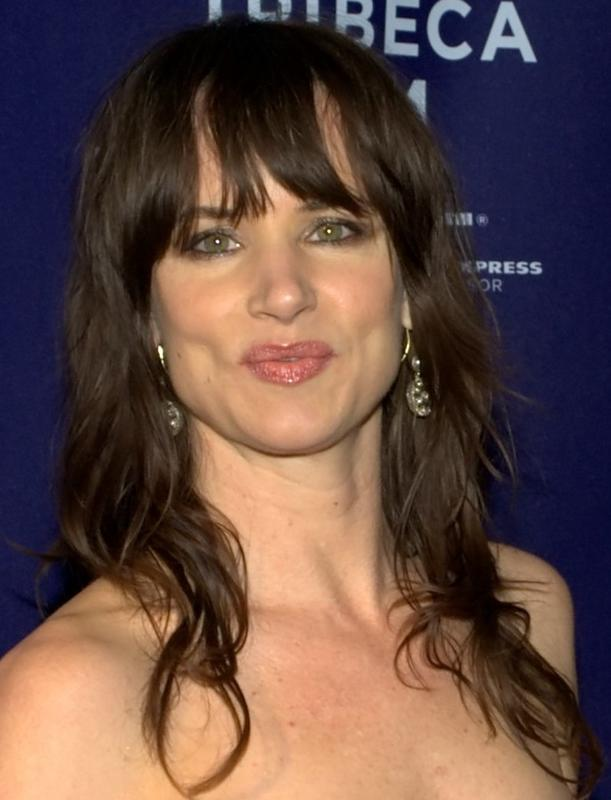
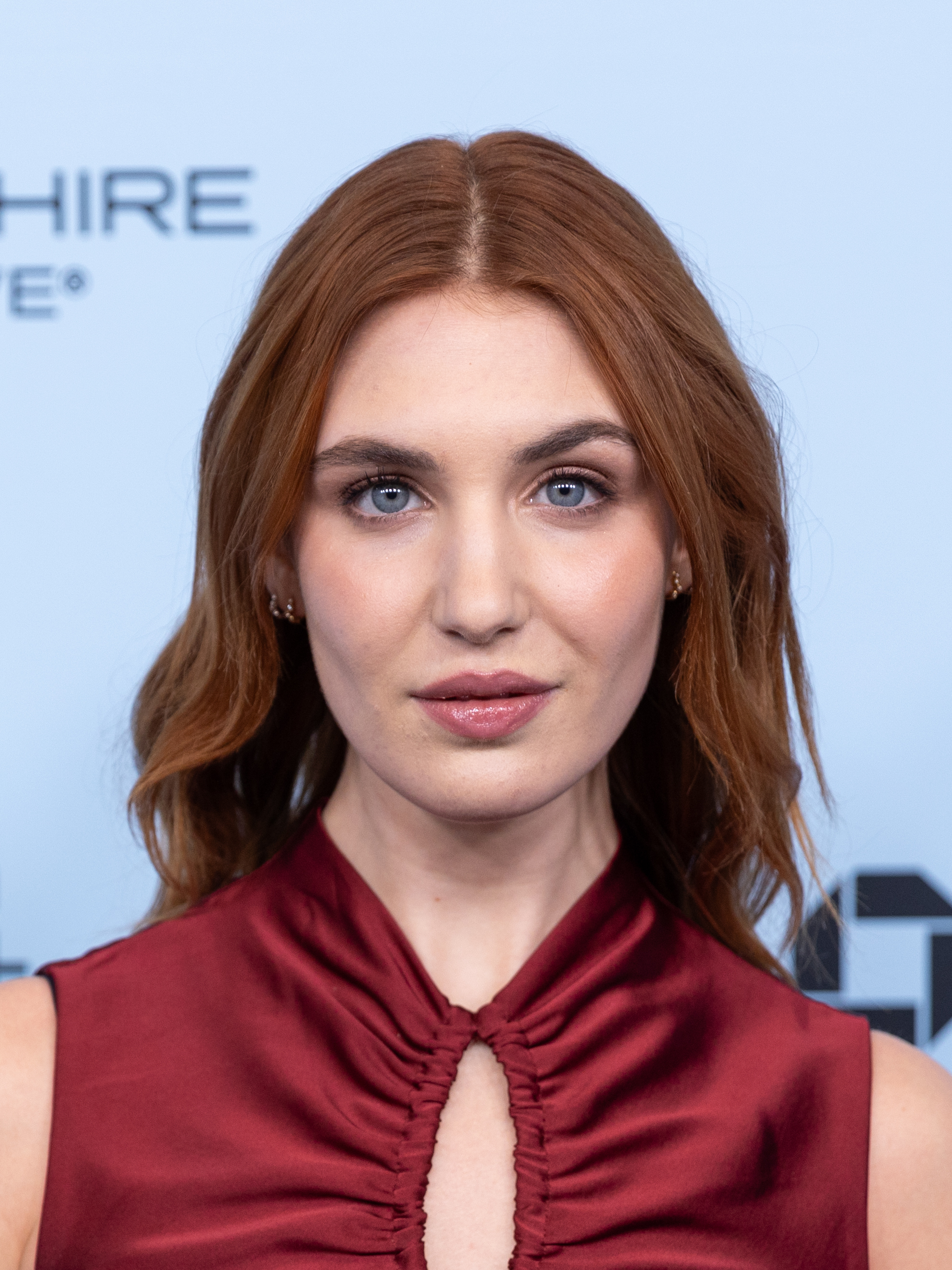
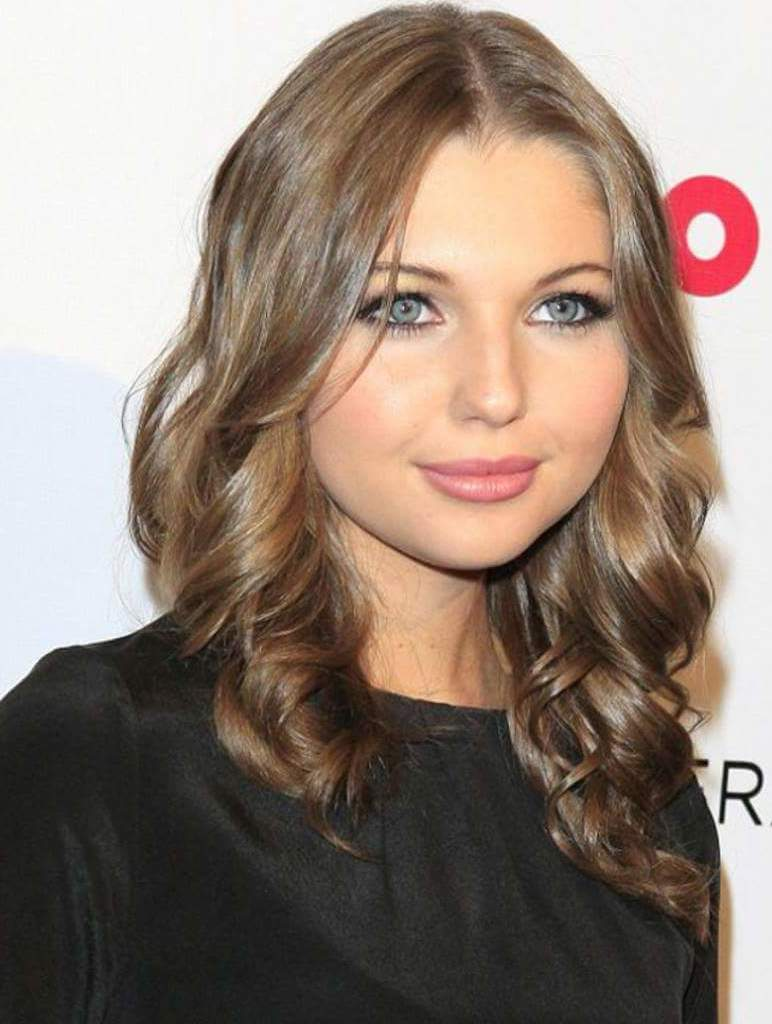
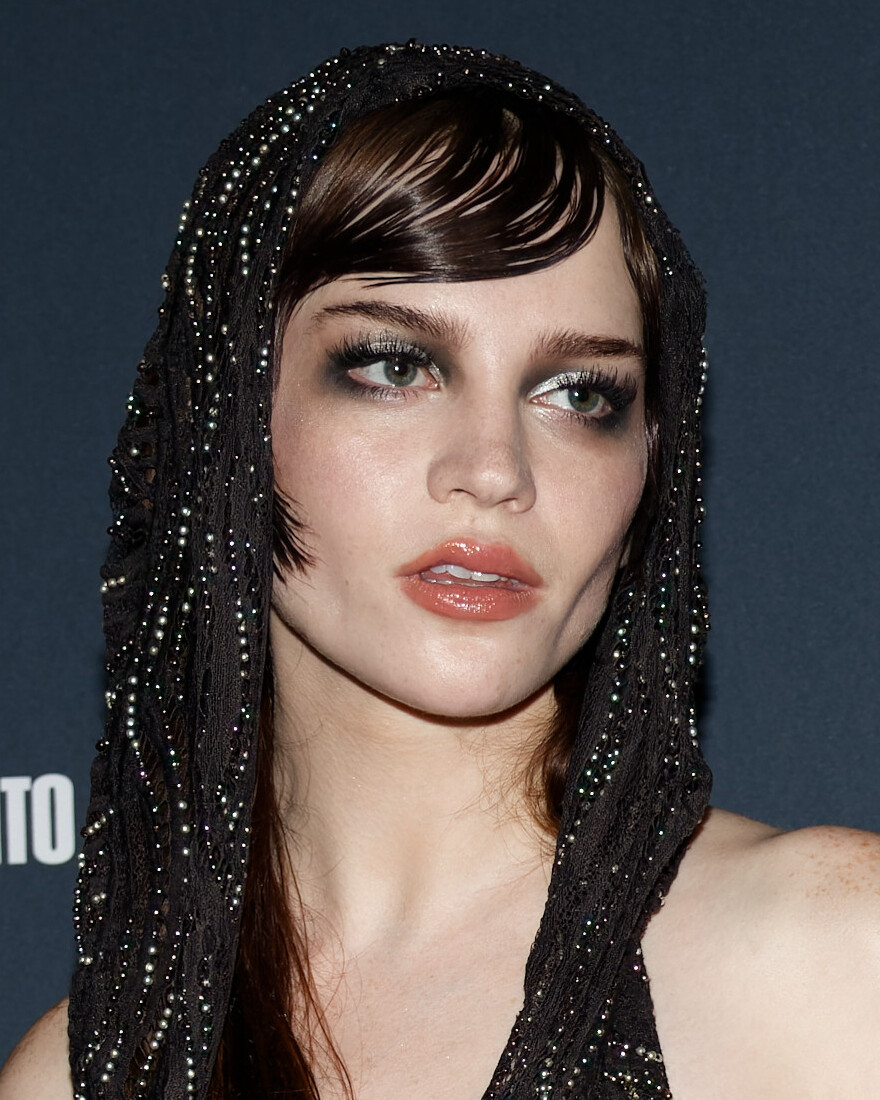
The cast, which includes Sophie Nélisse, Sammi Hanratty, and Sophie Thatcher (bottom) as the younger versions of Melanie Lynskey, Christina Ricci, and Juliette Lewis' (top) characters, received acclaim.

The cast received widespread praise, with RogerEbert.com's Brian Tallerico calling it "one of the best ensembles of the season". The casting of 1990s teen idols Lynskey, Ricci, and Lewis was lauded as being part of the show's meta commentary. In Salon, Melanie McFarland wrote, "The beauty of Lynskey's and Cypress' separate performances is the way they conceal how dangerous they can be, but just barely." Of Lynskey in particular, Poniewozik wrote the show lets her "play the kind of layered ennui she evoked so well in HBO’s Togetherness. You think you know her character — a quiet housewife beaten down by life — and then she reveals a cutthroat toughness that she deploys psychologically against her surly teenage daughter and physically against a rabbit unlucky enough to rob her garden." In IndieWire, Kristen Lopez wrote that the "fun of Yellowjackets is in watching Lewis and Ricci tear up the scenery and each other," adding that Lewis brings "a necessary grit [with] inner vulnerability" and Ricci sports a "Patrick Bateman-level…of psychopathy that is terrifying."

The actresses playing the teenagers similarly received acclaim. Lopez wrote, "Thatcher, Nelisse, Purnell, Samantha Hanratty as young Misty, and Jasmin Savoy Brown as young Taissa are all fantastic...Where the individual adult actors are such defined personalities...the teen girls have to illustrate not just their dynamics in an ensemble but their state of becoming. In the case of Shauna and Jackie, their relationship is so fraught with those unspoken power dynamics that exist between girls that much of the actresses' power comes from the silent glances between them." The show's 1996 timeline was praised for its coming-of-age plot lines that "[treat] the concerns [of teenage girls] with obvious sympathy", with characters that subvert "lazy teen stereotypes". The latter timeline was described by The New Yorker's Doreen St. Félix as a "spiky exploration of the feminist dream deferred". Critics observed that Yellowjackets' parallel structure emphasizes the lingering trauma of the survivors' time in the wild.

Though reviews were universally positive, critics noted that the show works best when it does not lean into supernatural mystery box aspects and instead focuses on the horrors of survival and the breakdown of social dynamics. Angie Han of The Hollywood Reporter wrote, "Any attempts to connect the past and present versions of the characters are stymied by the gaping hole in the middle, which after six episodes is still filled only with promises that some future twist will explain everything. The series feels so stuck on the question of what happened that it can't even begin to think about what it might mean." However, Han concluded: "In the meantime, Yellowjackets remains too fun to write off just yet. Its gutsiness sets it apart from the usual survival-drama fare, and its performances suggest a deeper story even if we don't know what it is quite yet."

=== Accolades ===
The first season of Yellowjackets was nominated for six Primetime Emmy Awards, including for Outstanding Drama Series, Outstanding Lead Actress in a Drama Series for Melanie Lynskey and Outstanding Supporting Actress in a Drama Series for Christina Ricci. Jonathan Lisco, Bart Nickerson, and Ashley Lyle were nominated for Outstanding Writing for a Drama Series for the pilot episode and "F Sharp". Karyn Kusama was nominated for Outstanding Directing for a Drama Series for directing the pilot. At the 27th Critics' Choice Awards, Lynskey won for Best Actress in a Drama Series.
