= F Sharp (Yellowjackets) =

- Yellowjackets episode
- Episode no.: Season 1 Episode 2
- Directed by: Jamie Travis
- Written by: Jonathan Lisco; Ashley Lyle; Bart Nickerson
- Cinematography by: C. Kim Miles
- Editing by: Kevin D. Ross
- Original release date: November 21, 2021
- Running time: 57 minutes

Guest appearances
- Courtney Eaton as Teen Lottie; Liv Hewson as Teen Van; Jane Widdop as Laura Lee; Keeya King as Akilah; Peter Gadiot as Adam Martin; Alex Wyndham as Kevyn Tan; Kevin Alves as Teen Travis; Alexa Barajas as Mari; Sarah Desjardins as Callie Sadecki; Rukiya Bernard as Simone Abara; Carlos Sanz as Coach Bill Martinez

Episode chronology
← Previous "Pilot"	Next → "The Dollhouse"

"F Sharp" is the second episode of the American thriller drama television series Yellowjackets. The episode was written by executive producer Jonathan Lisco and series creators Ashley Lyle and Bart Nickerson, and directed by co-executive producer Jamie Travis. It originally aired on Showtime on November 21, 2021.

The series follows a New Jersey high school girls' soccer team that travels to Seattle for a national tournament in 1996. While flying over Canada, their plane crashes deep in the wilderness, and the surviving team members are left stranded for nineteen months. The series chronicles their attempts to stay alive as some of the team members are driven to cannibalism. It also focuses on the lives of the survivors 25 years later in 2021, as the events of their ordeal continue to affect them many years after their rescue. In the episode, Shauna and her husband face challenges in their marriage, while Natalie confronts Misty. Flashbacks depict the aftermath of the plane crash, and the survivors' attempt to maintain peace.

According to Nielsen Media Research, the episode was seen by an estimated 0.168 million household viewers and gained a 0.02 ratings share among adults aged 18–49. The episode received highly positive reviews from critics, who praised the performances, writing and ending. It received a nomination for Outstanding Writing for a Drama Series at the 74th Primetime Emmy Awards.

== Plot ==
=== 1996 ===
The plane crashes in the wilderness, killing many of the passengers. The group barely escapes the plane as it starts catching fire, with Jackie (Ella Purnell) forcing Shauna (Sophie Nélisse) to abandon Van (Liv Hewson), who is unable to take off her seatbelt. Van barely escapes, but winds up with a scarred face. Assistant coach Ben Scott (Steven Krueger) has his leg crushed by one of the plane's bulkheads, and Misty (Sammi Hanratty) shocks everyone by amputating his leg and cauterizing it.

Using her medical aid experience, Misty helps the injured. The team finds that Coach Bill Martinez (Carlos Sanz) has died due to his body landing on a tree, devastating his children Travis (Kevin Alves) and Javi (Luciano Leroux). Jackie tries to maintain peace among the group, explaining that the plane's emergency locator beacon will reveal their location and that they will be rescued very soon. Later, while going to urinate, Misty discovers the black box. She overhears two girls saying that they are lucky to have her and appreciate her efforts to save them. Enjoying the attention she is receiving, Misty destroys the black box, mistaking it for the beacon.

=== 2021 ===
While driving, Shauna (Melanie Lynskey) rear-ends a car. The driver, Adam Martin (Peter Gadiot), does not argue with Shauna over the car, and gives her a phone number to a shop where he can get her car fixed for free. Shauna also meets with her husband, Jeff (Warren Kole), for marriage counseling, where they discuss their problems in their sexual relationship. The therapist suggests trying sexual fantasies, but the couple gets into a fight while enacting Jeff's fantasy that revolves around a furniture store.

Misty (Christina Ricci) returns home, only to find Natalie (Juliette Lewis) awaiting with a shotgun. She believes Misty sent her a postcard with a mysterious symbol, but Misty states she also received a similar postcard. As they go to a bar to talk about possibly finding the whereabouts of Travis, Natalie reunites with her high school friend Kevyn (Alex Wyndham). Taissa (Tawny Cypress) becomes concerned when Sammy (Aiden Stoxx) starts making disturbing drawings. When Taissa talks to him, Sammy claims that the "lady on the tree" is watching him.

Shauna calls the shop, finding that Adam himself is working there. That night, she and Jeff finally have sex after Shauna takes the lead. While he goes to the bathroom, Shauna sees that his phone includes a text from a woman named Bianca, asking to meet him again. In the morning, Natalie tries to leave to find Travis, but finds that her car has broken down. Misty offers to come with her, but Natalie insists on driving.

== Development ==
=== Production ===
The episode was written by executive producer Jonathan Lisco, and series creators Ashley Lyle and Bart Nickerson, and directed by co-executive producer Jamie Travis. This marked Lisco's first writing credit, Lyle's second writing credit, Nickerson's second writing credit, and Travis' first directing credit. The episode was originally titled "Heart-Shaped Black Box".

== Reception ==
=== Viewers ===
The episode was watched by 0.168 million viewers, earning a 0.02 in the 18-49 rating demographics on the Nielsen ratings scale. This means that 0.02 percent of all households with televisions watched the episode. This was a 32% decrease in viewership from the previous episode, which was watched by 0.246 million viewers, earning a 0.02 in the 18-49 rating demographics.

=== Critical reviews ===
"F Sharp" received highly positive reviews from critics. Leila Latif of The A.V. Club gave the episode a "B" and wrote, "While the episode wasn't quite balanced, Yellowjackets is still managing to keep things moving while layering new mysteries. Whether that will lead to an overcrowded mess by the midseason point or an intricate tapestry of damaged people and terrible things remains to be seen, but Misty's story bodes well. The character study in “F Sharp” worked as a grounded but deliciously twisted villain origin story."

Kelly McClure of Vulture gave the episode a perfect 5 star rating out of 5 and wrote, "When she's forced to attend couples therapy with her husband to mend their lackluster sex life, the therapist tells them that “Marriage lives up here (heart) and dies down here (crotch).” Still, for the surviving Yellowjackets, it's common knowledge that in marriage, or life as a whole, there are much bigger things to worry about, and way worse ways to die."

Brittney Bender of Bleeding Cool gave the episode a 9.5 out of 10 rating and wrote, "The second episode of Showtime's Yellowjackets uses incredible detail to guide the audience along a path of drama, horror, and mystery in a unique and compelling way - giving equal time to the mysteries of the past and the present." Greg Wheeler of The Review Geek gave the episode a 4 star rating out of 5 and wrote, "The back and forth editing is beautifully done and this whole episode centers around deceptions and bad marriages. The various survivors from the plane crash each have different secrets to keep and it'll be interesting to see how that pans out over the weeks."

=== Awards and accolades ===
For the episode, Jonathan Lisco, Ashley Lyle and Bart Nickerson were nominated for Outstanding Writing for a Drama Series at the 74th Primetime Emmy Awards. They would lose to Jesse Armstrong for the episode "All the Bells Say" in Succession.
