= Blood Hive =

- Yellowjackets episode
- Episode no.: Season 1 Episode 5
- Directed by: Eva Sørhaug
- Written by: Ameni Rozsa
- Cinematography by: Trevor Forrest
- Editing by: Kevin D. Ross
- Original release date: December 12, 2021
- Running time: 58 minutes

Guest appearances
- Courtney Eaton as Teen Lottie; Liv Hewson as Teen Van; Jane Widdop as Laura Lee; Keeya King as Akilah; Peter Gadiot as Adam Martin; Alex Wyndham as Kevyn Tan; Kevin Alves as Teen Travis; Alexa Barajas as Mari; Sarah Desjardins as Callie Sadecki; Rukiya Bernard as Simone Abara; Andres Soto as Travis Martinez

Episode chronology
← Previous "Bear Down"	Next → "Saints"

"Blood Hive" is the fifth episode of the American thriller drama television series Yellowjackets. The episode was written by co-executive producer Ameni Rozsa, and directed by Eva Sørhaug. It originally aired on Showtime on December 12, 2021.

The series follows a New Jersey high school girls' soccer team that travels to Seattle for a national tournament in 1996. While flying over Canada, their plane crashes deep in the wilderness, and the surviving team members are left stranded for nineteen months. The series chronicles their attempts to stay alive as some of the team members are driven to cannibalism. It also focuses on the lives of the survivors 25 years later in 2021, as the events of their ordeal continue to affect them many years after their rescue. In the episode, Natalie and Misty find new details regarding Travis' death, while Shauna and Adam go on a date. Flashbacks depict the survivors' struggle to maintain peace in the cabin.

According to Nielsen Media Research, the episode was seen by an estimated 0.295 million household viewers and gained a 0.06 ratings share among adults aged 18–49. The episode received mostly positive reviews from critics, praising the performances, flashback sequences and character development.

== Plot ==
=== 1996 ===
While going to the lake to retrieve water, Jackie (Ella Purnell) finds Lottie (Courtney Eaton) in the water, staring blankly into the distance. Taissa (Jasmin Savoy Brown) and Van (Liv Hewson) start a relationship, while Natalie (Sophie Thatcher) and Travis (Kevin Alves) also kiss.

Jackie suggests having a séance among the girls to calm themselves; some of them are scared of spirits being in the old cabin. Misty (Sammi Hanratty) uses the opportunity to ask the "spirit" if the man she loves (Ben) loves her back, and is given a yes in return. Lottie has another breakdown, speaking French and smashing her head against the window, before seemingly returning to normal. Misty visits Ben (Steven Krueger), who realizes she has been poisoning him. She reveals her feelings for him, and Ben decides to play along by proclaiming he also loves her, but their age difference makes it inappropriate. While disappointed, Misty understands.

When the girls feel scared over the noise in the attic, Taissa decides to sleep there for one night and invites anyone to join her, with Shauna being the only one. There, Taissa questions Shauna if she is pregnant, which she confirms. Taissa promises not to tell anyone, but warns that if they stay in the forest for longer than anticipated, the secret is likely to come out eventually.

=== 2021 ===
Shauna (Melanie Lynskey) makes plans to go to a Halloween party with Adam (Peter Gadiot). Her daughter Callie (Sarah Desjardins) continues to ignore her, already making plans to attend a Halloween party in the city despite Shauna forbidding her from attending.

Kevyn (Alex Wyndham) calls Natalie (Juliette Lewis) to inform her that there was nothing of note (specifically, no drugs in his system) on Travis' death report. Nevertheless, she contacts Misty (Christina Ricci), asking her to hack Kevyn's e-mail to check if something is missing. Misty's contact retrieves the information but is hesitant to hand it over when he discovers that it involves the police. Natalie threatens him by covering him with gasoline and implying that she would drop a matchstick, forcing him to give her the file. Checking the file, Natalie and Misty realize that the floor of the area Travis' body was found had spilled wax that drew the symbol they saw in the forest and received on postcards.

Taissa (Tawny Cypress) finds the word "spill" painted on the front door of her home, and confronts Sammy after discovering a container of paint in his room. Sammy denies doing so and blames "the lady in the tree", turning aggressive when Taissa demands honesty. She confides in Simone (Rukiya Bernard) that she is considering dropping out of the Senate run. She calls for a press conference, but shocks Simone by instead announcing that she will stay in the race and blames the graffiti on her home on her opponent's supporters.

At the Halloween party Shauna and Adam are at, she runs into Callie, who admits to being high on ecstasy. Shauna is infuriated to learn that Callie stole Jackie's Yellowjackets jersey from her closet and leaves with her, although Callie realizes that she is having an affair with Adam. The following morning, Callie tries to blackmail Shauna by telling her that if she does not receive more freedom, including a lifted curfew and more unsupervised time in the city, she will tell her father (Shauna's husband) about the affair. Instead, Shauna warns Callie that if she tells Jeff (Warren Kole) about the affair, the divorce lawyers will be paid with Callie's college fund, and that she will often be staying at a dilapidated apartment with Jeff on the weekends. Shauna calls Jeff downstairs to talk with Callie, who simply confesses to sneaking off in the night. Taissa meets with Natalie, who shows her evidence that a ritual was held where Travis was murdered. They are both sent an anonymous message containing the symbol, demanding $50,000 and stating that if they discuss the event with their "teammates", the sender will know. They call Shauna to warn her, but she reveals that Misty already told her. As they ask her to come, they are unaware that Misty is watching them through a hidden camera.

== Development ==
=== Production ===
The episode was written by co-executive producer Ameni Rozsa, and directed by Eva Sørhaug. This marked Rozsa's first writing credit, and Sørhaug's second directing credit. The episode was originally titled "Blood Sugar Sex Magic".

== Reception ==
=== Viewers ===
The episode was watched by 0.295 million viewers, earning a 0.06 in the 18-49 rating demographics on the Nielsen ratings scale. This means that 0.06 percent of all households with televisions watched the episode. This was a massive 83% increase in viewership from the previous episode, which was watched by 0.161 million viewers, earning a 0.03 in the 18-49 rating demographics.

=== Critical reviews ===
"Blood Hive" received mostly positive reviews from critics. Leila Latif of The A.V. Club gave the episode a "B+" and wrote, "After a week of stagnation, it's pleasing to see Yellowjackets step it up a notch. Although we are still asking lots of questions and getting few answers, there's plenty to sink one's proverbial teeth into."

Kelly McClure of Vulture gave the episode a perfect 5 star rating out of 5 and wrote, "Citizen Detective Misty is using a camera hidden inside an owl-shaped diffuser she gifted to Natalie to spy on her conversations as she attempts to figure out what really happened to Travis. She seems always to have been a little, uh, different, so it could be that she's just inappropriately nosy. Or she could be orchestrating something much more sinister. If she was comfortable giving assistant coach Ben poisoned tea back in the day because he was mad at her for grabbing his boner, then who knows what she's capable of now. Christina Ricci plays such a good nut. Goddamn, this show is fun." Cade Taylor of Telltale TV gave the episode a 3.5 star rating out of 5 and wrote, "One theory I keep entertaining is that the girls intentionally left members behind in the wilderness, which would more than likely cause an uproar. People may even call for them to serve jail time. And if this theory is correct, it could also explain why someone would be sending them postcards and taunting them."

Brittney Bender of Bleeding Cool gave the episode a 9 out of 10 rating and wrote, "Showtime's Yellowjackets maintained suspense, gave character insight, and produced even more theories for fans to dig through, proving that this is a series that understands the best parts of television." Greg Wheeler of The Review Geek gave the episode a 4 star rating out of 5 and wrote, "After last week's misstep, episode 5 comes bouncing back again with a much improved chapter. There's some great character development for Shauna and we see the extent these girls are willing to go to keep their secrets – and get ahead in life."
