= Saints (Yellowjackets) =

- Yellowjackets episode
- Episode no.: Season 1 Episode 6
- Directed by: Bille Woodruff
- Written by: Chantelle M. Wells
- Cinematography by: C. Kim Miles
- Editing by: Jeff Israel
- Original release date: December 19, 2021
- Running time: 58 minutes

Guest appearances
- Courtney Eaton as Teen Lottie; Liv Hewson as Teen Van; Jane Widdop as Laura Lee; Keeya King as Akilah; Alex Wyndham as Kevyn Tan; Kevin Alves as Teen Travis; Alexa Barajas as Mari; Rukiya Bernard as Simone Abara; Rekha Sharma as Jessica Roberts; Gabrielle Rose as Mrs. Taylor; Kevin McNulty as Mr. Taylor

Episode chronology
← Previous "Blood Hive"	Next → "No Compass"

"Saints" is the sixth episode of the American thriller drama television series Yellowjackets. The episode was written by supervising producer Chantelle M. Wells, and directed by Bille Woodruff. It originally aired on Showtime on December 19, 2021.

The series follows a New Jersey high school girls' soccer team that travels to Seattle for a national tournament in 1996. While flying over Canada, their plane crashes deep in the wilderness, and the surviving team members are left stranded for nineteen months. The series chronicles their attempts to stay alive as some of the team members are driven to cannibalism. It also focuses on the lives of the survivors 25 years later in 2021, as the events of their ordeal continue to affect them many years after their rescue. In the episode, Natalie tries to get the $50,000 to meet with the blackmailer, while Taissa faces challenges after choosing to stay in the Senate race. Flashbacks depict Lottie's struggle when she believes she is receiving visions, while Taissa attempts to help Shauna with an abortion.

According to Nielsen Media Research, the episode was seen by an estimated 0.289 million household viewers and gained a 0.06 ratings share among adults aged 18–49. The episode received critical acclaim, with critics praising the performances, character development, tone and directing.

== Plot ==
=== 1989 ===
A young Lottie is accompanying her parents in a car. As they stop in a traffic light, Lottie suddenly screams. Her father scolds her, until they see that the car in front of them gets in a car crash with a truck. Lottie returns to her normal behavior, while her parents are confused over her actions. That night, her father tells her mother that they will send Lottie to see a psychiatrist.

=== 1996 ===
While scouting, Lottie (Courtney Eaton) sees a vision of a deer covered in blood. That night, Shauna (Sophie Nélisse) confides in Taissa (Jasmin Savoy Brown) that she plans to perform a self-induced abortion, revealing that Jeff is her baby's father. Taissa helps her with the procedure, but they are both unable to do it.

Ben (Steven Krueger) tells Travis (Kevin Alves) that he knows he and Natalie (Sophie Thatcher) are in a relationship. But he warns him that they are not in a good position if Natalie gets pregnant, so he gives him some condoms. Lottie asks Laura Lee (Jane Widdop) for help in understanding her visions, as she believes God might want to say something. Laura Lee takes her to a lake, where she baptizes her. Lottie has another vision where she sees the deer again, and wakes up as she sees Laura Lee covered in light. When she states she saw the light, Laura Lee reaffirms she saw the Holy Spirit.

Travis and Natalie try to have sex, but Travis still feels nervous. She feels insulted when he asks how many people she slept with, but reconciles when he notes he never had a girlfriend. They stop their session when they see a deer, killing it with the rifle. They bring the deer – which has bloody antlers – to the cabin to eat, but when Shauna opens the animal, the body is filled with maggots. Lottie is terrified, realizing that her vision became reality. Fed up with their conditions, Taissa says she will leave in the morning to hike and find the closest civilization.

=== 2021 ===
Shauna (Melanie Lynskey) meets with Natalie (Juliette Lewis) and Taissa (Tawny Cypress) at the motel to discuss the blackmail. Natalie suspects Jessica (Rekha Sharma) is the blackmailer, but Shauna believes they cannot contact her in case she does not turn out to be. They consider leaving a GPS tracker with the money in order to follow the blackmailer.

Shauna and Jeff (Warren Kole) visit Jackie's parents for the "birthday party" that they've thrown for Jackie each year after her death. As the luncheon progresses, it becomes apparent that the Taylors have idealized her memory, with Mrs. Taylor going as far as to claim that, even though Jeff was originally Jackie's boyfriend, she would nevertheless approve of his and Shauna’s marriage. Shauna excuses herself and visits Jackie's bedroom, exchanging a conversation with an hallucination of Jackie and guiltily recalling the girls’ giddy conversation during their freshman year when Jackie first revealed her feelings for Jeff. After Mrs. Taylor makes multiple passive aggressive jabs towards Shauna unfavorably comparing her looks, intelligence, and popularity with Jackie’s, Jeff spitefully reveals that he and Shauna began sleeping together while Jackie was still alive, stunning the Taylors into silence. On the drive home, Jeff shares with Shauna that, despite their ups and downs, he is still happy that they got married, unknowingly making her feel guilty for her ongoing affair.

Taissa accompanies Simone (Rukiya Bernard) to discuss Sammy's behavior, and she almost hits a cyclist while arguing with her in the car. Natalie sells her car to get the $50,000 needed for the blackmailer, and allows Kevyn (Alex Wyndham) to accompany her. They watch a soccer game where Kevyn's son plays, and they end up having sex in Natalie's motel.

Misty (Christina Ricci), who is watching Natalie and Kevyn having sex, calls Jessica to meet up. When Jessica enters her car, Misty injects her and keeps her hostage at her house. That night, Taissa finds herself with her hands bloodied outside her house, revealing that she was the "lady in the tree." She is then contacted by Natalie, who tells her they need to meet with their blackmailer.

== Development ==
=== Production ===
The episode was written by supervising producer Chantelle M. Wells, and directed by Bille Woodruff. This marked Wells' first writing credit, and Woodruff's first directing credit. The episode was originally titled "Always Be My Baby".

== Reception ==
=== Viewers ===
The episode was watched by 0.289 million viewers, earning a 0.06 in the 18-49 rating demographics on the Nielsen ratings scale. This means that 0.06 percent of all households with televisions watched the episode. This was a slight decrease in viewership from the previous episode, which was watched by 0.295 million viewers, earning a 0.06 in the 18-49 rating demographics.

=== Critical reviews ===
"Saints" received critical acclaim. Leila Latif of The A.V. Club gave the episode an "A–" and wrote, "It's a beautiful thing when you feel a show fall into its rhythm, when it feels truly self-assured and confident enough to drop huge twists in one storyline and do slower paced, but equally engrossing character development in another. The news that Yellowjackets has been picked up for season two seems particularly perfect given that it is accompanied by an episode that is a microcosm of what makes the show so good."

Kelly McClure of Vulture gave the episode a 4 star rating out of 5 and wrote, "Shauna flashes to a scene of her and her friend, as their younger selves, sitting on Jackie's bed and practicing what to say to figure out whether or not Jeff has a crush on Jackie. That bit, juxtaposed with Shauna nearly self-aborting Jeff's baby with the underwire from a bra in the woods, is really rough. If her wilderness baby is the same as the teenage daughter she currently has, then surely Jackie learned her secret while they were still stranded. This is just getting more and more intense." Cade Taylor of Telltale TV gave the episode a 3.5 star rating out of 5 and wrote, "The series pulls back the layers of the figurative onion, slowly revealing info here and there. But, nothing majorly telling about their time in the woods has been in the spotlight. Viewers still know virtually nothing of what happened while they were stranded."

Brittney Bender of Bleeding Cool gave the episode a perfect 10 out of 10 rating and wrote, "Showtime's Yellowjackets rises above expectations, being both emotionally gripping and visually stunning. The story goes to unexpected places in the best possible ways, inviting viewers to experience what the characters are suffering through time and time again." Greg Wheeler of The Review Geek gave the episode a 4 star rating out of 5 and wrote, "It'll be interesting to see just what direction this takes next and exactly how the kids managed to get off the island. There are a lot of questions still to be answered but Yellowjackets has done well to keep everything at arm's length and tease out this tantalizing mystery every week."
