= Bear Down (Yellowjackets) =

- Yellowjackets episode
- Episode no.: Season 1 Episode 4
- Directed by: Deepa Mehta
- Written by: Liz Phang
- Cinematography by: C. Kim Miles
- Editing by: Kindra Marra
- Original release date: December 5, 2021
- Running time: 58 minutes

Guest appearances
- Courtney Eaton as Teen Lottie; Liv Hewson as Teen Van; Jane Widdop as Laura Lee; Keeya King as Akilah; Peter Gadiot as Adam Martin; Alex Wyndham as Kevyn Tan; Kevin Alves as Teen Travis; Alexa Barajas as Mari; Rekha Sharma as Jessica Roberts; Rukiya Bernard as Simone Abara; Lauren K. Robek as Diane Rafelson

Episode chronology
← Previous "The Dollhouse"	Next → "Blood Hive"

"Bear Down" is the fourth episode of the American thriller drama television series Yellowjackets. The episode was written by co-executive producer Liz Phang, and directed by Deepa Mehta. It originally aired on Showtime on December 5, 2021.

The series follows a New Jersey high school girls' soccer team that travels to Seattle for a national tournament in 1996. While flying over Canada, their plane crashes deep in the wilderness, and the surviving team members are left stranded for nineteen months. The series chronicles their attempts to stay alive as some of the team members are driven to cannibalism. It also focuses on the lives of the survivors 25 years later in 2021, as the events of their ordeal continue to affect them many years after their rescue. In the episode, Natalie meets with Kevyn to find more information regarding Travis' death, while Shauna and Adam start an affair. Flashbacks depict the survivors learning to use a rifle for hunting.

According to Nielsen Media Research, the episode was seen by an estimated 0.161 million household viewers and gained a 0.03 ratings share among adults aged 18–49. The episode received mixed reviews from critics, who criticized the pacing and amount of subplots, particularly Shauna's storyline.

== Plot ==
=== 1996 ===
Natalie (Sophie Thatcher) begins experiencing nightmares, wherein her father blames her for his death. In the cabin, the group finds a rifle. Coach Ben (Steven Krueger) hopes they can use it to hunt animals, but is unable to properly use it due to his amputation. He has the group try out the rifle to check who can hunt, with Natalie and Travis (Kevin Alves) being selected after proving they are the best suited to use the weapon. During this, Shauna (Sophie Nélisse) and Javi (Luciano Leroux) begin bonding when she allows him to use her journal to express himself.

While Natalie and Travis leave to hunt for food, the survivors discover a functional propeller aircraft, and begin working on ways to make it work. Natalie realizes that Travis took her to the crash site, as he wants to find his father's ring, which belonged to his ancestors. Realizing this is to calm Javi, Natalie helps him find it, and they both end up becoming friends after both open up about their problems with their parents. On the way back, they find a deer, and Natalie kills it with the rifle. When they bring it to the cabin, Ben allows Shauna to butcher the deer, which they eat that night.

In another flashback, Natalie hangs out with Kevyn (Sean Martin Savoy) in her bedroom, when her abusive father appears, forcing Kevyn to leave. As Natalie's mother intervenes, he slaps her. An angered Natalie takes a shotgun, but leaves the safety on. He takes it and walks off, insulting her and her mother. When Natalie answers back, he turns back but accidentally slips, killing himself when the gun blows his head off.

=== 2021 ===
While driving, Natalie (Juliette Lewis) is called by Misty (Christina Ricci). Natalie maintains Travis did not commit suicide, and sets out to find any evidence to support the claim. She visits her mother, who is still living in her childhood house. She retrieves a mixtape that Kevyn made for her, and leaves. She subsequently meets with Kevyn (Alex Wyndham), who is now a police officer. They go dining, unaware that Misty is following them.

Taissa (Tawny Cypress) and Simone (Rukiya Bernard) attend an event, hoping that Taissa can get an endorsement from Diane Rafelson (Lauren K. Robek), powerful potential donor. However, Diane wants Taissa to open up about her life in the wilderness, certain that there are more details than the disclosed story. Taissa feels insulted, and walks off, rejecting her endorsement. Shauna (Melanie Lynskey) and Adam (Peter Gadiot) have started an affair, with Adam wanting to know more about Shauna's personal life. They spend time playing mini-golf, as well as jumping off a bridge naked, where Shauna sees a hallucination of Jackie (Ella Purnell).

Misty notices that Jessica (Rekha Sharma) is also in the restaurant, and calls Natalie to warn her, but she does not want anything to do with her. Misty instead approaches Jessica and asks her not to continue any further. When Natalie makes it clear that she wants to know about Travis' death, Kevyn offers to find official reports. Shauna arrives home, where she is called by Misty. She reports that Travis died, shocking Shauna. As she enters, she sees Jeff (Warren Kole) seated in the couch.

== Development ==
=== Production ===
The episode was written by co-executive producer Liz Phang, and directed by Deepa Mehta. This marked Phang's first writing credit, and Mehta's first directing credit. The episode was originally titled "Head Like a Hole".

== Reception ==
=== Viewers ===
The episode was watched by 0.161 million viewers, earning a 0.03 in the 18-49 rating demographics on the Nielsen ratings scale. This means that 0.03 percent of all households with televisions watched the episode. This was a 24% decrease in viewership from the previous episode, which was watched by 0.210 million viewers, earning a 0.03 in the 18-49 rating demographics.

=== Critical reviews ===
"Bear Down" received mixed reviews from critics. Leila Latif of The A.V. Club gave the episode a "C–" and wrote, "Melanie Lynskey is such a talented actress, it's a terrible shame to see her lumbered with this half-baked rom-com storyline. More embarrassing still is when she finally gets home and husband Jeff asks her how book club went, as many-hour-long book clubs are a thing. Jeff the husband, we the audience, and Lynskey the actress deserve better than this."

Kelly McClure of Vulture gave the episode a perfect 5 star rating out of 5 and wrote, "The heart of Yellowjackets relies on several different elements to keep it beating as strongly as it does. There's shame. There's subterfuge. And there's rage. After the first three episodes we've learned how the girls came to be stranded after their plane went down on the way to nationals, but even after episode four, we still don't have a full picture of what exactly took place while they were there for a year and a half. What we do know is that it was bad enough, and savage enough, to spin them all out into a long stretch of hard-lived years as adults."

Brittney Bender of Bleeding Cool gave the episode a perfect 10 out of 10 rating and wrote, "The destruction of trauma and secrets make this episode of Showtime's Yellowjackets just as impactful as the season's entire run so far, bringing this series into the spotlight as a great example of dramatic writing." Greg Wheeler of The Review Geek gave the episode a 2.5 star rating out of 5 and wrote, "Well, what a filler that was. I do appreciate slow burn episodes but this is the “Jack gets a tattoo in Lost ” episode of Yellowjackets. It teaches us absolutely nothing new about any of these characters."
