= Flight of the Bumblebee (Yellowjackets) =

- Yellowjackets episode
- Episode no.: Season 1 Episode 8
- Directed by: Ariel Kleiman
- Written by: Cameron Brent Johnson; Liz Phang
- Cinematography by: C. Kim Miles
- Editing by: Kindra Marra
- Original release date: January 2, 2022
- Running time: 58 minutes

Guest appearances
- Courtney Eaton as Charlotte "Lottie" Matthews; Liv Hewson as Vanessa "Van" Palmer; Jane Widdop as Laura Lee; Keeya King as Akilah; Peter Gadiot as Adam Martin; Kevin Alves as Teen Travis; Alexa Barajas as Mari; Rekha Sharma as Jessica Roberts; Sarah Desjardins as Callie Sadecki; Rukiya Bernard as Simone Abara

Episode chronology
← Previous "No Compass"	Next → "Doomcoming"

"Flight of the Bumblebee" is the eighth episode of the American thriller drama television series Yellowjackets. The episode was written by Cameron Brent Johnson and co-executive producer Liz Phang, and directed by Ariel Kleiman. It originally aired on Showtime on January 2, 2022.

The series follows a New Jersey high school girls' soccer team that travels to Seattle for a national tournament in 1996. While flying over Canada, their plane crashes deep in the wilderness, and the surviving team members are left stranded for nineteen months. The series chronicles their attempts to stay alive as some of the team members are driven to cannibalism. It also focuses on the lives of the survivors 25 years later in 2021, as the events of their ordeal continue to affect them many years after their rescue. In the episode, Taissa asks Shauna for help when she believes her sleepwalking could be dangerous, while Natalie discovers Misty has been spying on her. Flashbacks depict Laura Lee's decision to fly in the abandoned plane to find help.

According to Nielsen Media Research, the episode was seen by an estimated 0.311 million household viewers and gained a 0.06 ratings share among adults aged 18–49. The episode received mixed reviews from critics, with critics polarized over Laura Lee's death.

== Plot ==
=== 1996 ===
In a flashback, Laura Lee (Jane Widdop) jumps into a public swimming pool, hitting her head. The lifeguard pulls her from the water and revives her, but he explains that it was God who saved her.

Taissa (Jasmin Savoy Brown) and the girls build a pyre for Van (Liv Hewson), believing her to have died. However, she is revealed to be alive, and they pull her out of the fire. They take her back to the cabin, where they stitch her face back together. Natalie (Sophie Thatcher) joins Ben (Steven Krueger) near a river to talk about the end of her relationship with Travis (Kevin Alves). Natalie reveals that she knows Ben is gay, and Ben explains that he was planning to move in with his boyfriend after the championship. Ben helps her with her relationship, explaining that perhaps Travis is simply nervous. During this, Travis tries to fish with Jackie (Ella Purnell), and she tries to fix his relationship. She mentions that Natalie slept with a guy named Bobby, making Travis irate. He confronts Natalie, as Bobby bullied him, and they break up for good.

In the morning, Laura Lee announces that she will take the abandoned plane and fly off to find help, having studied the flight manual. She needs to find medical assistance for Van, as they will not survive the oncoming winter. Jackie also says that Shauna (Sophie Nélisse) needs help, revealing her pregnancy. Ben opposes her plan, but Laura Lee makes it clear he cannot stop her. The group helps her in removing the branches to clear the airfield. Laura Lee sets off, taking her teddy bear with her. The take off is successful, and she heads off across the lake. However, the teddy bear suddenly catches fire, which quickly spreads through the plane. The group watches in horror as the plane explodes mid-air.

=== 2021 ===
Callie (Sarah Desjardins) confronts Shauna (Melanie Lynskey) for her affair with Adam (Peter Gadiot), as she found his wallet in her bedroom. Callie states that she looked him up, and Adam has no social media presence anywhere. Shauna investigates Adam's background and finds that most of his claims are lies.

After breaking up with Kevyn, Natalie (Juliette Lewis) prepares to relapse with cocaine. Suddenly, Misty (Christina Ricci) shows up and throws the cocaine around the floor. When Misty says she was watching her, Natalie realizes that she has a hidden camera in her bedroom and confronts her. Misty defends her actions, explaining that she found that Travis' bank account was emptied shortly after his death. Shauna is visited by Taissa (Tawny Cypress), who is suffering from sleepwalking, suffering a condition wherein she becomes an entirely different person at night. To make her comfortable, Shauna shares her bed with Taissa. Fearing she will hurt Sammy, she begs Simone (Rukiya Bernard) to leave her alone in the house for a while.

Shauna visits Adam at his apartment, confronting him over his lies. Adam admits it, but suggests taking her to a cabin where he can reveal everything about him. Natalie fails to get information when contacting Travis' bank, and relapses after finding some cocaine on the floor. Natalie tries to get information out of Suzie, an acquaintance who works in a bank. After Suzie refuses to cooperate, Natalie threatens to expose their activities, in which they sold confidential information of her customers. While trying on a dress, Shauna discovers glitter on her bedroom closet floor, remembering that the blackmailer fell into a box of glitter as he ran from her. After finding her safe empty, she angrily confronts Adam over his real identity.

== Development ==
=== Production ===
The episode was written by Cameron Brent Johnson and co-executive producer Liz Phang, and directed by Ariel Kleiman. This marked Johnson's first writing credit, Phang's second writing, and Kleiman's first directing credit. The episode was originally titled "Fire Walk With Me".

== Reception ==
=== Viewers ===
The episode was watched by 0.311 million viewers, earning a 0.06 in the 18-49 rating demographics on the Nielsen ratings scale. This means that 0.06 percent of all households with televisions watched the episode. This was a slight decrease in viewership from the previous episode, which was watched by 0.327 million viewers, earning a 0.06 in the 18-49 rating demographics.

=== Critical reviews ===
"Flight of the Bumblebee" received mixed reviews from critics. Leila Latif of The A.V. Club gave the episode a "B–" and wrote, "It's hard to even put into words how much, after all this, the ending lands with a thud. We are all aware they have a year or so left in the wilderness, so Laura Lee is doomed to fail. Her death above the lake provokes a few interesting responses, such as Jackie burrowing her face into Travis' chest, but it proves a cheap trick all round."

Kelly McClure of Vulture gave the episode a perfect 5 star rating out of 5 and wrote, "This episode is ramping up to the conclusion of the first season and focuses on Laura Lee, who has been a sort of Bible chucking, now let us bow our heads punchline. But here she's smoothing the creases in her sensible dress, grabbing her trusty teddy bear, and stepping forward to do the hell something about the fact that winter is coming and they will soon have nothing left to eat. Well, nothing aside from the pack of wolves in the woods that we saw in the last episode, but TBD if those were even real or not." Cade Taylor of Telltale TV gave the episode a 4 star rating out of 5 and wrote, "With only two episodes left, I'm ready for s*** to hit the fan. I want answers, but I also want the tension and drama to be upped. I'm ready for the teenagers to devolve and begin their descent into animalistic ways. Before the finale ends, I need them to be separated into two clans."

Brittney Bender of Bleeding Cool gave the episode a perfect 10 out of 10 rating and wrote, "Yellowjackets is becoming a force to be reckoned with, mixing supernatural elements with all the dramatic horrors a fan could hope for in this episode. Showtime is quickly becoming a place for profound storytelling that gives its audience a lingering sense of dread with this series, and trust me that's a high compliment." Greg Wheeler of The Review Geek gave the episode a 3 star rating out of 5 and wrote, "After several episodes of development, Yellowjackets slows down considerably this week. There's some drip-fed information about time in the wilderness, and specifically the issues surrounding the girls, but mostly the present-day lives for these three women – Shauna, Tai and Nat – is where most of the episode spends its time."

=== Accolades ===
TVLine named Christina Ricci as an honorable mention for the "Performer of the Week" for the week of January 8, 2022, for his performance in the episode. The site wrote, "Is anyone on TV right now having more fun than Yellowjackets' Christina Ricci? Her off-kilter take on Misty in Showtime's mysterious drama is a hoot-and-a-half every week, even as we're learning that the kooky character is more than capable of Very Bad Things. In the latest episode, we guffawed at Ricci's physical comedy skills as Misty burst into Nat's motel room and immediately thrust her face into a plate full of cocaine, all in service of saving her former teammate from relapsing. We couldn't stop laughing at the juxtaposition of Ricci's excited pacing (as Misty tried to monitor her coked-up heart rate) with the dire urgency with which she chastised her friend... but to what end? Which brings up one of the best aspects of Ricci's performance in Season 1 so far: We never truly know what Misty is thinking, and trying to figure it out is a pure delight, courtesy of an actress who never disappoints."
