= No Compass =

- Yellowjackets episode
- Episode no.: Season 1 Episode 7
- Directed by: Eva Sørhaug
- Written by: Katherine Kearns
- Cinematography by: Trevor Forrest
- Editing by: Damien Smith
- Original release date: December 26, 2021
- Running time: 58 minutes

Guest appearances
- Courtney Eaton as Teen Lottie; Liv Hewson as Teen Van; Jane Widdop as Laura Lee; Keeya King as Akilah; Peter Gadiot as Adam Martin; Alex Wyndham as Kevyn Tan; Kevin Alves as Teen Travis; Alexa Barajas as Mari; Rekha Sharma as Jessica Roberts

Episode chronology
← Previous "Saints"	Next → "Flight of the Bumblebee"

"No Compass" is the seventh episode of the American thriller drama television series Yellowjackets. The episode was written by Katherine Kearns, and directed by Eva Sørhaug. It originally aired on Showtime on December 26, 2021.

The series follows a New Jersey high school girls' soccer team that travels to Seattle for a national tournament in 1996. While flying over Canada, their plane crashes deep in the wilderness, and the surviving team members are left stranded for nineteen months. The series chronicles their attempts to stay alive as some of the team members are driven to cannibalism. It also focuses on the lives of the survivors 25 years later in 2021, as the events of their ordeal continue to affect them many years after their rescue. In the episode, Shauna, Natalie and Taissa try to catch the blackmailer. Flashbacks depict Taissa leaving with a group to find help, while Jackie suspects Shauna hides something from her.

According to Nielsen Media Research, the episode was seen by an estimated 0.327 million household viewers and gained a 0.06 ratings share among adults aged 18–49. The episode received very positive reviews from critics, who praised the pacing and performances in the episode.

== Plot ==
=== 1996 ===
Taissa (Jasmin Savoy Brown) leaves for her expedition, taking Van (Liv Hewson), Misty (Sammi Hanratty), Akilah (Keeya King), and Mari (Alexa Barajas) with her, along with an axe and a flare gun. Before leaving, Lottie (Courtney Eaton) confides in Van that she had a dream where they faced a "river of blood" and "red smoke".

Jackie (Ella Purnell) confronts Shauna (Sophie Nélisse), as she feels she has been very distant and wants to know what is happening. Shauna reveals her pregnancy, but claims that the father was Randy, a fellow classmate. Jackie says she will support her, but is left confused because the timeline of their supposed encounter does not make sense. That night, Jackie steals Shauna's diary and reads it, devastated by its content. Travis (Kevin Alves) and Natalie (Sophie Thatcher) try to have sex, but Travis is unable to hold his erection.

While walking, Taissa's group finds a red-colored river, scaring Van. To complicate matters, the compass stops working, leaving them stranded. During the night, a pack of wolves ambush the group, and the girls try to fend them off with torches. Taissa uses a flare gun to scare them, but it does not work. When the wolves maul Van, Taissa uses the axe to kill one of them. The wolves flee, but Van is severely wounded.

=== 2021 ===
Shauna (Melanie Lynskey), Natalie (Juliette Lewis), and Taissa (Tawny Cypress) agree to pay $50,000 to a blackmailer, planning to place a GPS tracker in the bag. They place the bag in a bin, and wait for the blackmailer to appear. They notice a trucker pulling up and confront the driver, but realize he is not the blackmailer. After spotting the real blackmailer, the group chases them. The blackmailer falls into a box of glitter during the pursuit before getting away without the tracker.

At her house, Misty (Christina Ricci) decides to tend Jessica (Rekha Sharma) when she continues screaming from her basement. Misty accuses her of blackmailing them and killing Travis, but Jessica rejects the claim. She explains that Taissa herself hired her to contact the other survivors and retrieve any vital information they may have. She suggests partnering so they can find out more, but Misty is not interested. When Misty threatens her with fentanyl, Jessica reveals that she visited Travis before his death, but he did not want to talk. She also reveals that after his death, someone emptied his bank account.

Shauna returns home, surprised to find Adam (Peter Gadiot) waiting for her. After discussing, they end up having sex as there is no one else in Shauna's house. When Jeff (Warren Kole) arrives in the morning, Shauna hides Adam in the closet and forces him to leave when Jeff takes a shower. Natalie and Kevyn (Alex Wyndham) have sex, but Kevyn gets upset when he finds that she used his gun, as there is a bullet missing. Natalie dismisses his concerns, reducing their relationship to just sex, and he angrily leaves.

== Development ==
=== Production ===
The episode was written by Katherine Kearns, and directed by Eva Sørhaug. This marked Kearns' first writing credit, and Sørhaug's third directing credit. The episode was originally titled "Dances With Wolves".

== Reception ==
=== Viewers ===
The episode was watched by 0.327 million viewers, earning a 0.06 in the 18-49 rating demographics on the Nielsen ratings scale. This means that 0.06 percent of all households with televisions watched the episode. This was a 13% increase in viewership from the previous episode, which was watched by 0.289 million viewers, earning a 0.06 in the 18-49 rating demographics.

=== Critical reviews ===
"No Compass" received very positive reviews from critics. Leila Latif of The A.V. Club gave the episode a "B+" and wrote, "It's easy to want a show like Yellowjackets to get a move on and solve some of its mysteries. Who is wearing the antlers and veil? What happened to Jackie? What is Adam hiding? But strangely, it's the slowest sequences of this week’s episode, “No Compass,” that prove the best."

Kelly McClure of Vulture gave the episode a perfect 5 star rating out of 5 and wrote, "Believing that this show is about a group of teens resulting to cannibalism to survive being stranded in the wilderness after a plane crash is wild enough, but this show is so much wilder than even that. Not since the days of Lost and Twin Peaks has there been a show so rich in mysterious possibility and, after watching episode seven, I feel like my eyes are just loosely rolling around in my head as I attempt to make sense of all of the numerous hints, clues, and symbols served up in what we’ve been shown so far." Cade Taylor of Telltale TV gave the episode a 2.5 star rating out of 5 and wrote, "Where Yellowjackets fails on “No Compass” is the nonexistent growth between Natalie and Travis. They're in their teens going through puberty out in the middle of nowhere, so yes, sex will be an important topic. However, that doesn't mean it should be the primary storyline for two significant characters."

Brittney Bender of Bleeding Cool gave the episode a perfect 10 out of 10 rating and wrote, "Showtime's Yellowjackets goes to some seriously unexpected places in this episode, ramping up the drama and gruesome horror to a new level that confirms my belief that this show will make a huge impact and have the television landscape buzzing by the time the season wraps." Greg Wheeler of The Review Geek gave the episode a 4 star rating out of 5 and wrote, "this series is just starting to heat up and as we reach the business end of this season, everything is left wide open for where this one may go next."
