= Pilot (Yellowjackets) =

- Yellowjackets episode
- Episode no.: Season 1 Episode 1
- Directed by: Karyn Kusama
- Written by: Ashley Lyle; Bart Nickerson
- Cinematography by: Julie Kirkwood
- Editing by: Plummy Tucker
- Original release date: November 14, 2021
- Running time: 57 minutes

Guest appearances
- Courtney Eaton as Teen Lottie; Liv Hewson as Teen Van; Keeya King as Akilah; Kevin Alves as Teen Travis; Jane Widdop as Laura Lee; Alexa Barajas as Mari Ibarra; Jack DePew as Jeff; Carlos Sanz as Coach Bill Martinez; Rekha Sharma as Jessica Roberts; Sarah Desjardins as Callie Sadecki; Rukiya Bernard as Simone Abara; Pearl Amanda Dickson as Allie Stevens

Episode chronology
← Previous —	Next → "F Sharp"

"Pilot" is the first episode of the American thriller drama television series Yellowjackets. The episode was written by series creators Ashley Lyle and Bart Nickerson, and directed by executive producer Karyn Kusama. It was released on Showtime on November 14, 2021, but it was available for free on November 6, 2021.

The series follows a New Jersey high school girls' soccer team that travels to Seattle for a national tournament in 1996. While flying over Canada, their plane crashes deep in the wilderness, and the surviving team members are left stranded for nineteen months. The series chronicles their attempts to stay alive as some of the team members are driven to cannibalism. It also focuses on the lives of the survivors 25 years later in 2021, as the events of their ordeal continue to affect them many years after their rescue. The episode introduces the characters, and the ramifications of the plane crash.

According to Nielsen Media Research, the episode was seen by an estimated 0.246 million household viewers and gained a 0.02 ratings share among adults aged 18–49. The episode received highly positive reviews from critics, who praised the story, characters, performances and intrigue. It received nominations for Outstanding Writing for a Drama Series and Outstanding Directing for a Drama Series at the 74th Primetime Emmy Awards.

== Plot ==
In the snowy wildlands, a woman in a nightgown is running in a forest, while whispers and noises are heard in the distance. Frightened, she continues running out of fear, until she falls into a trap, getting impaled by spikes. A young person wearing animal fur and mask takes her before other participants; they proceed to butcher and devour her body.

In 2021, Shauna Shipman (Melanie Lynskey) is approached by Jessica Roberts (Rekha Sharma), a reporter from The Star-Ledger. Jessica offers her a 7-figure book deal for details regarding her experience as a survivor of a 1996 airplane crash, but Shauna is not interested. Natalie Scatorccio (Juliette Lewis), another survivor from the crash, checks out of rehab in California, telling her sponsor that the experience helped her find a purpose. After leaving, she decides to take a flight.

Taissa Turner (Tawny Cypress), another survivor, is doing a photoshoot with her wife Simone (Rukiya Bernard) and son Sammy (Aiden Stoxx), as she launches her Senate campaign. During the photoshoot, the photographer wants her to address her past, but she wants to leave that behind. She later meets up with Shauna, who used a secret phone to contact her, and Shauna informs her about Jessica. Shauna investigated her, and found that she is not working for any paper. Taissa is not concerned about her, and she reveals that they still keep in touch with the other survivors. One of these is Misty Quigley (Christina Ricci), who now works as a geriatric nurse, and is unaware that Natalie is following her.

In flashbacks to 1996, the Yellowjackets win their soccer game, allowing them to compete in Nationals in Seattle. The leader of the team is Jackie Taylor (Ella Purnell), who is the best friend of Shauna (Sophie Nélisse). As they prepare for a practice, Taissa (Jasmin Savoy Brown) notes that their teammate Allie (Pearl Amanda Dickson) is not good enough for the team. Fearing that she will cost them the championship, Taissa injures Allie during practice by breaking her leg. That night, the team attends a party, where Shauna accuses Taissa of injuring Allie on purpose. Jackie stops the fight, and gets the girls to apologize and reconcile. Jackie's boyfriend Jeff (Jack DePew) drops her off at her house, and then drives Shauna to her house. They pull over by the road and have sex.

The following morning, the team leaves for the championship on a private plane paid by the father of their teammate Charlotte "Lottie" Matthews (Courtney Eaton). Due to the weather, the plane must take a detour to Canada. Shauna sleeps during the flight, but is woken when the plane experiences severe turbulence. Shauna opens the window shade and sees that the plane is falling and about to crash into the wilderness.

== Production ==
=== Development and casting ===
The pilot was written by series creators Ashley Lyle and Bart Nickerson, and directed by executive producer Karyn Kusama. It was written without any actresses specifically in mind, and auditions were held in Los Angeles. "We decided pretty early on we weren't going to get overly focused on a physical match," Lyle mentioned. As a result, some cast members had to dye their hair and wear contact lenses to match the physical characteristics of their counterparts. Melanie Lynskey was the first person to join the cast. Lyle said the role of Shauna was "the trickiest to cast" because they "wanted to find an actress who could embody somebody who is really trying to figure out who they are, which is kind of a tricky internal thing to express through her acting". Lynskey questioned the showrunners and extracted as much information as she could about her character's past and the five-season storyline to improve her performance. For the role of Natalie, Nickerson said they searched for "someone who was really free-spirited and unique who could play both a sort of wildness and a vulnerability". Though most of the auditions were held in-person, Sophie Thatcher submitted a self-recorded audition tape and was cast as Natalie before Juliette Lewis, who portrays the character's adult counterpart. When asked if the group's survival would depend on their gender, Thatcher replied, "I think naturally, especially at such a young age, women are more emotionally intelligent. So to turn into that cannibalistic mindset ... it maybe took them longer just because I think women are smarter than men. But I think that's it. Besides that, there's no difference. They're going to go batshit crazy."

Nickerson said it was vital to find two actresses who could portray Misty with "a deep kind of humanity that could make it feel lived in and real"; the role was eventually given to Sammi Hanratty and Christina Ricci. On joining the cast, Hanratty said she originally auditioned for the role of Natalie before being brought back four times to audition for the role of Misty: "I'm not gonna lie, I was so crushed [when I didn't get Natalie] because I loved the project. They said they would keep me in mind. Then, I think it was about a week later that I got the audition for Misty, which was so exciting. Because I was like, 'Oh, this girl is interesting as can be." To give her another chance, Lyle and Nickerson wrote a scene specifically for the casting process in which Misty confronts a teacher over cheating. After Hanratty was brought back, Lyle said "It was immediate. As soon as she read that scene for us, we said, 'OK, she is Misty.'" Hanratty described the auditions as being "really intense". She did not meet any of her co-stars until the table read for the pilot.

According to Nickerson, Jasmin Savoy Brown and Tawny Cypress were cast as Taissa because they were both able to portray her with a "level of dynamic strength" as well as "vulnerability and fragility". Ella Purnell portrayed Jackie, a character who proved difficult to cast. Lyle said the character was supposed to be a stereotypical popular girl with "little cracks of that façade". She explained, "I think that her insecurity, her vulnerabilities needed to be on display pretty early on or you'd end up hating her and that was sort of the opposite of what we wanted the audience to feel." Lynskey, Cypress, and Brown were announced as series regulars in October 2019, with Lewis, Ricci, Purnell, Hanratty, Thatcher, and Sophie Nélisse, joining the cast in November. The following month, Ava Allan, Courtney Eaton, and Liv Hewson were cast in recurring roles.

=== Filming and afterwards ===
The pilot was greenlit in September 2019 and shot in Los Angeles in November. According to location manager Jimmie Lee, several scenes from the pilot were filmed on top of the ski slopes on Mammoth Mountain. The rehab scenes were shot in a mansion located at 26848 Pacific Coast Highway, while a number of scenes set in the high school were filmed in and around John Marshall High School in Los Feliz, Los Angeles. In an interview, Lynskey said the masturbation scene from the pilot represented her character's lack of boundaries. In the pilot's opening scene, a flash-forward shows a group covered in fur clothing. Hanratty was the only cast member present while the scene was shot and the other characters were played by stunt coordinators. Hanratty says the writers have not told the cast which characters appear in that scene: "We all have our theories on who that is too, and we have a group chat in our cast where we try to come up with theories ourselves of what's going on and who we think is who."

In December 2020, Showtime gave Yellowjackets a series order.

== Reception ==
=== Viewers ===
The episode was watched by 0.246 million viewers, earning a 0.02 in the 18-49 rating demographics on the Nielsen ratings scale. This means that 0.02 percent of all households with televisions watched the episode.

=== Critical reviews ===
"Pilot" received highly positive reviews from critics. Leila Latif of The A.V. Club gave the episode a "B+" and wrote, "It's an impressively exciting and unflinching start to what is already a pitch-black subject matter — to focus not only on the brutality of surviving and succumbing to a collective madness, but also the lingering inescapable trauma. Each character's life, for now, remains disparate, but they all inhabit the same cursed landscape. Yellowjackets strips away any triumphant happy ending and traps those who escape in a different ring of hell."

Kelly McClure of Vulture gave the episode a perfect 5 star rating out of 5 and wrote, "There's an art to building a pilot that sets the premise of the show, introduces the main characters, and lays out an element of mystery to entice viewers to return again the following episode for more, all in under an hour. Creators Ashley Lyle and Bart Nickerson, along with director Karyn Kusama, do that in the very first episode of Yellowjackets better than we've seen in a long, long time."

Brittney Bender of Bleeding Cool gave the episode a perfect 10 out of 10 rating and wrote, "The very first episode of Yellowjackets is composed of excellent scenes filled with character development and originality that raises it above many other survival epics or drama series. Showtime has a winner on their hands, with an excellent cast leading the way through a horrific and tension-filled story." Greg Wheeler of The Review Geek gave the episode a 4 star rating out of 5 and wrote, "The first episode perfectly sets up all our characters, exudes exposition naturally and helps to introduce all our different key players across the season to come."

=== Awards and accolades ===
For the episode, Ashley Lyle and Bart Nickerson were nominated for Outstanding Writing for a Drama Series, while Karyn Kusama nominated for Outstanding Directing for a Drama Series at the 74th Primetime Emmy Awards.

Lyle and Nickerson would lose to Jesse Armstrong for the episode "All the Bells Say" in Succession, while Kusama would lose to Hwang Dong-hyuk for the episode "Red Light, Green Light" in Squid Game.
