= The Dollhouse (Yellowjackets) =

- Yellowjackets episode
- Episode no.: Season 1 Episode 3
- Directed by: Eva Sørhaug
- Written by: Sarah L. Thompson
- Cinematography by: Trevor Forrest
- Editing by: Jeff Israel
- Original release date: November 28, 2021
- Running time: 57 minutes

Guest appearances
- Courtney Eaton as Teen Lottie; Liv Hewson as Teen Van; Jane Widdop as Laura Lee; Keeya King as Akilah; Peter Gadiot as Adam Martin; Kevin Alves as Teen Travis; Alexa Barajas as Mari; Rukiya Bernard as Simone Abara; Rekha Sharma as Jessica Roberts; Andres Soto as Travis Martinez

Episode chronology
← Previous "F Sharp"	Next → "Bear Down"

"The Dollhouse" is the third episode of the American thriller drama television series Yellowjackets. The episode was written by co-executive producer Sarah L. Thompson, and directed by Eva Sørhaug. It originally aired on Showtime on November 28, 2021.

The series follows a New Jersey high school girls' soccer team that travels to Seattle for a national tournament in 1996. While flying over Canada, their plane crashes deep in the wilderness, and the surviving team members are left stranded for nineteen months. The series chronicles their attempts to stay alive as some of the team members are driven to cannibalism. It also focuses on the lives of the survivors 25 years later in 2021, as the events of their ordeal continue to affect them many years after their rescue. In the episode, Natalie and Misty visit Travis for questioning, while Taissa is concerned over Sammy's behavior. Flashbacks depict the survivors finding a cabin near a lake, as they await for rescue.

According to Nielsen Media Research, the episode was seen by an estimated 0.210 million household viewers and gained a 0.03 ratings share among adults aged 18–49. The episode received highly positive reviews from critics, who praised the performances, tone and editing.

== Plot ==
=== 1996 ===
The survivors have a funeral for those that died in the crash. Despite Jackie assuring them that rescue is on the way, three days have passed already since the crash. Taissa finds a lake a few miles away, and convinces the survivors to hike to it, hoping it will lead to civilization.

Upon reaching the lake, the survivors decide to swim for a while. Later, they notice a reflection nearby and leave to investigate, finding an abandoned cabin. While they have a shelter, the food has expired already. Ben accidentally falls off the porch and begins cursing, accidentally slapping Misty. Nevertheless, Misty consoles him, as Ben feels hopeless after losing his leg. That night, hearing a noise in the attic, Taissa goes up to investigate. She sees Lottie, who claimed to have a bad feeling about the cabin, in the corner. When Taissa checks the other side of the attic, she is shocked to find a skeleton in a rocking chair.

=== 2021 ===
While stopping at a gas station, Natalie has Misty go for food. During this, she checks the car's glove compartment, finding that Misty sabotaged her car. When they reach Eden Falls, New Hampshire, they break into Travis' cabin. As they investigate, they are arrested by the sheriff. Shauna follows Jeff after he leaves the furniture store, arriving at a hotel. There, she runs into Adam, and she accompanies him while trying to find Jeff's room.

Taissa is disturbed when she finds that Phil Bathurst, her political opponent, aired a video that depicts Taissa "cannibalizing your tax dollars". She wants to dig into his past to find dirt, but Simone does not believe it will lead to anything. Taissa contacts Jessica, revealing that she hired her to question the other survivors. Jessica states that Phil's daughter is a drug addict that avoided prison after he used his influence. Suddenly, Taissa finds that Sammy (Aiden Stoxx) has become violent and attacked a classmate at a playground. When she questions him, he turns aggressive and when his mother takes his doll away, orders her to "give him back." That night, Taissa talks with Sammy and they reconcile. Inspired by this, she calls Phil, threatening him to expose his daughter's actions if he tries another tactic like that again.

At the hotel, Shauna sees Jeff leaving with the woman, Bianca. She decides to get herself and Adam a room at the hotel. In jail, Natalie calls Taissa to help them, but Taissa does not want her name associated with it and so refuses to help. Misty instead calls Kevyn, who bails them out. They subsequently go to a ranch where Travis works, hoping to find him there. They find his dead body hanging, devastating Natalie. With the police coming, they are forced to leave. On the drive, Natalie proclaims that Travis did not commit suicide. Misty reveals that she retrieved a note from Travis' cabin, which reads, "tell Nat she was right."

== Development ==
=== Production ===
The episode was written by co-executive producer Sarah L. Thompson, and directed by Eva Sørhaug. This marked Thompson's first writing credit, and Sørhaug's first directing credit. The episode was originally titled "Welcome to the Dollhouse".

== Reception ==
=== Viewers ===
The episode was watched by 0.210 million viewers, earning a 0.03 in the 18-49 rating demographics on the Nielsen ratings scale. This means that 0.03 percent of all households with televisions watched the episode. This was a 25% increase in viewership from the previous episode, which was watched by 0.168 million viewers, earning a 0.02 in the 18-49 rating demographics.

=== Critical reviews ===
"The Dollhouse" received highly positive reviews from critics. Leila Latif of The A.V. Club gave the episode a "B" and wrote, "So much of Yellowjackets seemed set to deal with trauma, the ongoing nightmare that the girls, now women, are still trapped in, even decades after the crash. But more the third episode, “Welcome To The Dollhouse” introduces us to the trauma they entered the woods with — in Taissa's case, it's something terrible that seems to have been haunting every stage of her life."

Kelly McClure of Vulture gave the episode a perfect 5 star rating out of 5 and wrote, "In this episode, we learn that Jessica Roberts is not a reporter but someone Taissa has hired to lean on the girls to see if any of them offer up gory details of their time in the woods. My money is on Adam being some sort of plant along those lines as well."

Brittney Bender of Bleeding Cool gave the episode a perfect 10 out of 10 rating and wrote, "Proving to be one of the best shows on television right now, this episode of Showtime's Yellowjackets made me wish I could rate past a "10." Yes, it was THAT good. The blend of horror, grief, and weirdly appropriate comedic moments gave this one the push it needed to rank as another excellent chapter in a truly fascinating series." Greg Wheeler of The Review Geek gave the episode a 3.5 star rating out of 5 and wrote, "this was a slightly slower episode with a lot less reveals and more of a slow-paced character examination of Taissa. Let's hope things pick back up moving forward."
