= Parachute (film) =

American drama film

- Theatrical release poster
- Directed by: Brittany Snow
- Written by: Brittany Snow; Becca Gleason
- Produced by: Brittany Snow; Jordan Yale Levine; Jordan Beckerman; Lizzie Shapiro
- Starring: Courtney Eaton; Thomas Mann; Francesca Reale; Gina Rodriguez; Joel McHale; Dave Bautista; Scott Mescudi
- Cinematography: Kristen Correll
- Edited by: Henry Hayes; Matthew L. Weiss
- Music by: Keegan DeWitt
- Production company: Yale Productions
- Distributed by: Vertical
- Release dates: March 11, 2023 (SXSW); April 5, 2024 (United States)
- Running time: 108 minutes
- Country: United States
- Language: English

Parachute is a 2023 American drama film directed by Brittany Snow in her directorial debut. Snow co-wrote the script with Becca Gleason. Produced by Yale Entertainment, the film stars Courtney Eaton and Thomas Mann. Parachute had its world premiere at the SXSW Film Festival in March 2023, and was released on April 5, 2024, by Vertical.

== Plot ==
Riley has just come out of rehab with an eating disorder and body image issues. When her mother Olivia fails to come and pick her up, she calls her best friend Casey. Casey invites Riley to come and hang out at a bar, to which Riley is reluctant but ultimately agrees. There, she greets Casey's boyfriend Justin and meets Justin's roommate Ethan. They hit it off and leave to go have dinner together. Riley tells Ethan she's part of a twelve-step program following her time in rehab which discourages her from having romantic relationships for the first year following rehab, which Ethan accepts. Riley nevertheless brings Ethan to her apartment to have sex with him, but ultimately stops short of taking off her clothes due to her body insecurities. Ethan still agrees to spend time with her and builds a fort in her apartment.

Riley goes to therapy with Dr. Akerman, who suggests Riley's friendship with Ethan may be another means to numb her insecurities just like compulsive eating or starving herself, but Riley denies this. Over time, Riley is still struggling with her insecurities by comparing herself to other women she meets, looking at photos of social media models, listening to voicemails from her ex-boyfriend Hunter, and hitting herself in front of the mirror, despite Ethan's attempts to help her. Unemployed, Casey gets Riley a job as a hostess at a murder mystery dinner theater, which is struggling due to a poorly written story that patrons figure out easily. After a year, Riley begins dating the theater's bartender Max, much to Ethan's chagrin. Riley accepts an invitation to have Thanksgiving with Ethan and his family, where she learns that his father Jamie suffers from alcoholism and that Ethan has been struggling to help him. Uncomfortable following a family argument, Riley goes outside and reveals to Ethan that Max dumped her for an Instagram model. She vents all of her insecurities to Ethan, who tells her she is perfect to him and that he loves her. She reciprocates and they have sex, but she is uncomfortable afterwards.

Riley's insecurities exacerbate while dating Ethan and she eventually pushes him away, ultimately getting consoled by Dr. Akerman. Ethan confides to Justin he wants to help Riley yet can't, but Justin reminds him that it's not his job to help. At work, Riley's boss Bryce laments that he will likely have to shut down his establishment, but Riley offers to bring her knowledge of true crime to write a better murder mystery and Bryce agrees. While out with Casey and Justin, Casey reveals that she is pregnant. Riley learns that Ethan has started dating another girl named Gwen. Upset, she attempts to text Max before Casey stops her, berating her for being so caught up in her own pain that she doesn't care about anyone else.

Riley calls Ethan to help her shop for a new vacuum cleaner where they run into Hunter and his new girlfriend Danielle, which triggers Riley's insecurities. Going home, they find Olivia there and a couple of movers packing up the apartment. Olivia had taken notice that Riley had been spending Olivia's money with her friends and wants to cut her off. Ethan tells off Olivia for not being there for Riley when she needed it most and takes her to a family cabin. While there, Riley attempts to kiss Ethan, but he ultimately resists, saying he has been going to therapy over his inability to let go. Riley accuses Ethan of having a savior complex, while Ethan accuses Riley of being too selfish to learn how to get better and leaves. Riley goes into the bathroom and consumes painkillers with alcohol before lying in the bathtub. Ethan has a change of heart and goes back where he finds Riley throwing up in the toilet before passing out. Ethan takes Riley to the hospital.

Riley wakes up to find Olivia, who says that Ethan stayed for a while before Olivia insisted he go home. Olivia promises to be there for Riley more. They leave the hospital and are greeted by Casey. At work, Riley's updated murder mystery story is a huge success, giving Riley a newfound sense of validation. Casey and Justin hold a gender reveal party. Riley and Ethan come to the party, the latter with Gwen. The two don't speak, but exchange looks with each other. A flashback reveals that Ethan had told Riley in the hospital that he'll always love her, but acknowledges he's not helping her get better and he needs to let go before leaving, unknowing that Riley had heard him. Later, at a therapy session, Riley throws away her phone, acknowledging its distraction, and tells Dr. Akerman that while she knows the pain she's caused herself and others over the past few years, she's hopeful for the future.

== Cast ==
- Courtney Eaton as Riley
- Thomas Mann as Ethan
- Scott Mescudi as Justin
- Francesca Reale as Casey
- Gina Rodriguez as Dr. Akerman
- Joel McHale as Jamie
- Kathryn Gallagher as Gwen
- Owen Thiele as Devon
- Ekaterina Baker as Danielle
- Dave Bautista as Bryce
- Mlé Chester as Janice
- Chrissie Fit as Denise
- Lukas Gage as Dalton
- Kelley Jakle as Katie
- Jeremy Kucharek as Max
- Celeste Oliva as Olivia
- Jennifer Westfeldt as Lisa
- Bunny Gibson as Theater Lady

== Production ==
The project was announced as "September 17th" in February 2022 for Yale Productions with Jordan Yale Levine and Jordan Beckerman producing along with Lizzie Shapiro. Brittany Snow directed and produced the picture, and co-wrote the script with Becca Gleason. Snow said she had the idea for the film in her "early twenties". She has spoken previously about her own battle with eating disorders and rigorously planned "darker" scenes with storyboards so as to avoid Eaton spending more time than necessary in scenes criticising her own body, saying "I knew what I wanted very specifically in those scenes, I knew what angles I wanted to use, so I didn't have to have her cry hysterically all day." The film was scored by Keegan DeWitt.

=== Casting ===
In March 2022, Kid Cudi was announced to be cast in the project. In June 2022, Eaton, Mann, Rodríguez, and McHale were confirmed in the main roles.

== Release ==
The film had its premiere at the 2023 South by Southwest Film & TV Festival in Austin on March 11, 2023. In February 2024, Vertical acquired North American distribution rights to the film, releasing it in the United States in select theaters on April 5, 2024.

== Reception ==
On the review aggregator website Rotten Tomatoes, 81% of 21 critics' reviews are positive, with an average rating of 7.2/10.

Leslie Filperin of The Hollywood Reporter gave a positive review calling the film "smart and compassionate".
