= Lucky Weekend =

2026 Canadian film

- Directed by: Kevin Alves
- Written by: Kevin Alves
- Produced by: Julian Smither
- Starring: Kevin Alves; Alexa Barajas; Jesse Camacho
- Cinematography: Jared Marino
- Edited by: Van Wickiam
- Music by: Ben Fox
- Production company: 31 Twelve Films
- Release date: June 22, 2026 (Raindance)
- Running time: 80 minutes
- Country: Canada
- Language: English

Lucky Weekend is a Canadian comedy heist film, written and directed by Kevin Alves and released in 2026. The film stars Alves as Gabe, a teenager who is working multiple jobs to save up for college. He unexpectedly wins $40,000 in the lottery only to soon discover that his best friend Aaron (John Daniel) has stolen his ticket, and thus plots to steal it back over the weekend before Aaron can cash it.

The cast also includes Jesse Camacho, Alexa Barajas, Jessica Clement, Jack Ettlinger, Luke Hutchie, Marlene Vieira Leslie, Agape Mngomzelu, Clarice Wood and Alex Ozerov-Meyer in supporting roles.

Production on the film was first announced in 2024, with shooting taking place principally in Hamilton and St. Catharines, Ontario.

The film had its world premiere on June 22, 2026, at the Raindance Film Festival in London, followed by its North American premiere on October 24 at the 2026 Reelworld Film Festival.

At Reelworld, Alves won the award for Outstanding Feature Film Writer. The film is also slated to screen in the Borsos Competition program at the 2026 Whistler Film Festival.
