= Home (2013 film) =

- Directed by: Jono Oliver
- Written by: Jono Oliver
- Produced by: Daniela Barbosa; Ged Dickersin
- Starring: Gbenga Akinnagbe; Danny Hoch; Joe Morton; Tawny Cypress; K.K. Moggie; James McDaniel
- Cinematography: Sung Rae Cho
- Edited by: Ulysses Guidotti
- Music by: Gingger Shankar
- Release date: November 22, 2013 (Manhattan)
- Running time: 112 minutes
- Country: United States
- Language: English

Home is a 2013 American drama film written and directed by Jono Oliver and starring Gbenga Akinnagbe, Danny Hoch, Joe Morton, Tawny Cypress, K.K. Moggie and James McDaniel.

== Cast ==
- Gbenga Akinnagbe as Jack Hall
- Danny Hoch as Dundee
- Tawny Cypress as Laura
- Joe Morton as Donald Hall
- K.K. Moggie as Denise
- James McDaniel as Dr. Parker
- Tonya Pinkins as Esmin

== Release ==
The film was released theatrically in Manhattan on November 22, 2013. Then it was released on DVD and on-demand on March 25, 2014.

== Reception ==
The film has an 88% rating on Rotten Tomatoes based on eight reviews.

Stephanie Merry of The Washington Post gave the film a positive review and wrote, "Oliver is off to a promising start. Let’s hope it’s enough to get his next go-round a wider theatrical release."

Inkoo Kang of the Los Angeles Times also gave the film a positive review and wrote, "The great achievement in writer-director Jono Oliver’s poignant, superb debut, Home, lies in the balance between the film’s empathy for those like Jack who seek independence and its compassion for others who may need care indefinitely."

The Hollywood Reporter also gave the film a positive review: "This movingly understated drama benefits from strong performances and incisive characterizations."

Miriam Bale of The New York Times gave the film a negative review and wrote, "With awkward slow-motion effects, clunky transitions and pregnant zooms that seem conspicuously in the wrong speed or otherwise a little off, Mr. Oliver’s film aims for a glossy mainstream aesthetic without the budget or skills to match."
