= Alex Wyndham =

British actor

- Born: 1 January 1981 (age 45); Winchester, England, United Kingdom
- Education: University of Oxford; (BA)
- Alma mater: Royal Academy of Dramatic Art
- Occupation: Actor
- Years active: 2004–present

Alex Wyndham (born 1 January 1981) is an English actor who has appeared on radio and television and in films, known for supporting roles as Gaius Maecenas on the second season of the historical drama series Rome and Kevyn Tan in the first and second seasons of the psychological drama series Yellowjackets (2021–23).

== Biography ==
Wyndham was educated at Winchester College and has a degree in history from the University of Oxford where he appeared in a number of student plays. During his studies he did a lot of stage performance, including touring Japan with an OUDS production of Love's Labours Lost. He then trained at the Royal Academy of Dramatic Art (RADA), graduating in 2005. Wyndham augmented his formal education by completing programmes such as: a camera acting course at BBC Elstree Centre; earning the BASSC Certificate 1st class (distinction) armed and unarmed combat; and achieving the level of black belt (1st Dan) Shotokan Karate. He has many skills including period and Flamenco dancing, and sings baritone. His special interests include: athletics, films, travel, guitar, and graphic design.

His first job as a professional actor was playing Silvius in Kenneth Branagh's adaptation of As You Like It while he was still at drama school. His other credits include an appearance in T4's girl-band soap Totally Frank as Ben, The Line of Beauty and Henry Gowan in Little Dorrit. He also appeared as a "louche surgeon" in the BBC World War One medical drama The Crimson Field.

For BBC radio he has appeared in the title role in an adaptation of Forster's Maurice (2007), Rory in The Dig (2008), Clarence in Fortunes of War (2008), Robert in Lady Audley's Secret (2009), Captain Lombard in Christie's And Then There Were None (2010) and Lt. Maberly Dunster in Tommies (2014).

Wyndham narrates the historical romance novels of Bliss Bennet (The Penningtons) and Stella Riley (The Rockcliffe series and The Roundheads and Cavaliers series).

== Filmography ==
=== Film ===
Year	Title	Role
2006	As You Like It	Sylvius
2007	Arn – The Knight Templar	Armand De Gascogne
2009	The Hills Run Red	Lalo
2011	Lotus Eaters	Marlon
2011	Super Eruption	Josh
2022	The Sea Beast	Sailor #1, Sailor #2, Villager (voices)

=== Television ===
Year	Title	Role	Episode
2005	Totally Frank	Ben	6 episodes
2006	The Line of Beauty	Wani Ouradi	miniseries
2007	Rome	Gaius Maecenas	7 episodes
2008	Little Dorrit	Henry Gowan	miniseries
2014	The Crimson Field	Capt. Miles Hesketh-Thorne	6 episodes
2017	Endeavour	Dr. Jon Levin	Episode: "Harvest"
2021–2023	Yellowjackets	Kevyn Tan	12 episodes (seasons 1–2)
2024	Batman: Caped Crusader	Edmund Hayes	Episode: "...And Be a Villain"

=== Video games ===
Year	Title	Role
2017	Horizon Zero Dawn	Balahn
2018	We Happy Few	Arthur Hastings
2023	Immortals of Aveum	Hauser
2024	Dead by Daylight	Alucard
