= Tawny Cypress =

American actress

- Education: Rutgers University, New Brunswick (BFA)
- Occupation: Actress
- Years active: 2000–present
- Spouses: Bill Charles (m. 2000; div. 2004) Tom Dillon (m. 2011)
- Children: 1

Tawny Cypress is an American actress. She has appeared in various television and stage plays. She starred as art dealer Simone Deveaux on the NBC superhero series Heroes. She previously held roles on several TV series, including Fox's drama K-Ville as Ginger "Love Tap" LeBeau, Carly Heath on the Netflix drama House of Cards, and Cherie Rollins-Murray on the second and third seasons of the CBS series Unforgettable. In 2019, Cypress starred as Inez in the film Inez & Doug & Kira. Since 2021, Cypress has starred as Taissa Turner on Showtime's Yellowjackets.

== Early life ==
Tawny Cypress spent her childhood living in communities along the Jersey Shore, including the towns of Sea Girt, Belmar and Red Bank. She attended Mason Gross School of the Arts at Rutgers University. Cypress also attended William Esper Studio, where she was invited to teach in 2020.

== Career ==
Since 2000, she has been actively working in film and television. She had a main role in The Blacklist: Redemption as Nez Rowan, a mercenary. In 2021, Cypress was cast on Yellowjackets in the main role of Taissa Turner, a survivor of a horrific plane crash in the 1990s, now running for the New Jersey State Senate while trying to keep quiet the demons of nineteen months of survival in the Canadian wilderness.

== Personal life ==
Cypress was previously married to Bill Charles from 2000 to 2004, and they have one son together. Since 2011, she has been married to Tom Dillon. They reside in New Jersey with their many dogs and cats. Her brother is comic book artist Toby Cypress. Cypress revealed in the documentary Queer for Fear that she is attracted to women.

== Filmography ==
=== Film ===
Year	Title	Role	Notes
2000	Autumn in New York	Melissa	
2006	Bella	Frannie	
2006	World Trade Center	Bleeding Woman	
2009	Brooklyn's Finest	Allisa	
2011	Remains	Cindy	
2013	Home	Laura	
2019	Inez & Doug & Kira	Inez	

=== Television ===
Year	Title	Role	Notes
2000	NYPD Blue	Rosana Booth	Episode: "A Hole in Juan"
2000–2005	Third Watch	A.D.A. Sharon Burns	Recurring role (7 episodes)
2001–2002	100 Centre Street	Cassandra Rodriguez	Recurring role (6 episodes)
2002	Hack	Anna Rowe	Episode: "Bad Choices"
2003	Law & Order: Criminal Intent	Louisa Iberra	Episode: "Legion"
2003	All My Children	Prof. Shambala Stevens	Recurring role (6 episodes)
2005	Jonny Zero	Nina Calvo	Recurring role (6 episodes)
2005	Stella	Gemma	Episode: "Meeting Girls"
2006	Love Monkey	Crystal Sloane	Episode: "Mything Persons"
2006	The Time Tunnel	J.D.	TV film
2006–2007	Heroes	Simone Deveaux	Main role (13 episodes)
2007–2008	K-Ville	Ginger 'Love Tap' LeBeau	Main role (11 episodes)
2008	Law & Order: Special Victims Unit	Shawna	Episode: "Undercover"
2008	Army Wives	Brenda	Episodes: "Casting Out the Net", "Duplicity"
2009	House Rules	Robin Calhoun	TV film
2009	Rescue Me	Carla	Recurring role (5 episodes)
2010	Warehouse 13	Romana	Episode: "Age Before Beauty"
2011	Gun Hill	Andrea Logan	TV film
2012	The Good Wife	Melinda	Episode: "I Fought the Law"
2012	Blue Bloods	Patrice	Episode: "Nightmares"
2013	Elementary	Black Suit	Episode: "The Red Team"
2013	House of Cards	Carly Heath	Recurring role (5 episodes)
2013–2014	Unforgettable	Cherie Rollins-Murray	Main role (26 episodes)
2016	Supergirl	Senator Miranda Crane/White Martian	Guest role (2 episodes)
2016	The Blacklist	Nez Rowan	Recurring role (4 episodes)
2017	The Blacklist: Redemption	Nez Rowan	Main role (8 episodes)
2017	NCIS: New Orleans	FBI Special Agent Sarah Barns	Episode: "The Asset"
2018	Bull	Brooke Ford	Episode: "Excessive Force"
2018	FBI	Jillian Starls	Episode: "The Armorer's Faith"
2019	The Code	Col. Edina Corpus	Guest role (2 episodes)
2020	Lincoln Rhyme: Hunt for the Bone Collector	Naia	Guest role (2 episodes)
2020-2021	Billions	Dean Allison Walker	Guest role (2 episodes)
2021–present	Yellowjackets	Adult Taissa Turner	Main role (29 episodes)
2022	The Equalizer	Vanessa	Guest role (2 episodes)
