= Rukiya Bernard =

Canadian actress of Rwandese descent

- Born: Toronto, Ontario, Canada
- Education: Ryerson University (BFA)
- Years active: 1999–present
- Spouse: P. J. Prinsloo
- Children: 2

Rukiya Bernard is a Canadian actress, producer and interior designer. She is known for The Cabin in the Woods (2012), The Day the Earth Stood Still (2008), Stuck (2007) and her role as Doc in Syfy's Van Helsing.

== Early life ==
Rukiya Bernard was born in Toronto, Ontario, to Nyakiringa Magugu, a Kenyan art store owner, and Gilbert Bernard, a car wash owner. From a very young age, Rukiya’s parents immersed her in sport and art programming. She took part in basketball and track while studying classical ballet, karate and piano. She was accepted into Ryerson University’s theatre program from which she graduated with honours.

== Career ==
Rukiya's first job was the supporting role of Sophie Newman in Ernest Dickerson’s award-winning Our America opposite Josh Charles, Irma P. Hall and Mykelti Williamson. Rukiya has appeared in TV shows including SyFy's Van Helsing, The CW’s Supernatural, A&E’s The Returned, USA Network’s Fairly Legal, Hallmark’s The Gourmet Detective, NBC’s Eureka, Showtime’s The L Word, SyFy’s Sanctuary and SGU Stargate Universe, BBC America’s Intruders and Lifetime’s Witches Of The East End. She has also appeared in The Cabin In The Woods, Stuck and That Burning Feeling.

=== Interior design ===
Rukiya is an interior designer and starred on HGTV’s reality TV show The Stagers for two seasons.

== Personal life ==
Rukiya is married to P. J. Prinsloo, they have two children.

== Filmography ==
=== Film ===
Year	Title	Role	Notes
2001	Get Over It	Girl with Tampons in Hair	
2002	Our America	Sophie Newman	TV movie
2003	Nigel's Fingerprint	Mona Jenkins	
2005	Fallen	Woman On Beach	Short Film
2005	Cantata for the King	Congregation	TV movie
2005	Playing the Role	LaShaquandiqua Jones	Short Film
2005	Supervolcano	Soldier	TV movie
2006	12 Hours To Live	Deputy Dana Franklyn	TV movie
2007	My Name Is Sarah	Barista	TV movie
2007	Stuck	Tanya	
2008	The Most Wonderful Time of the Year	Denise	TV movie
2008	The Day the Earth Stood Still	Student	
2009	The Farm	Ammo	TV movie
2009	Spectacular!	Receptionist	TV movie
2009	Christmas in Canaan	Charlene	TV movie
2010	Tooth Fairy	Amnesia Woman	
2011	Christmas Lodge	Yolanda	TV movie
2012	The Cabin in the Woods	Labcoat Girl	
2012	Big Time Movie	Woman with Dog	TV movie
2012	The Music Teacher	Sheila	TV movie
2013	The BFF Club	Shoniqua	Short Film
2013	That Burning Feeling	Janine Clarke	
2015	The Unspoken	Portia	
2015	Breed	Violet	TV movie
2015	Just the Way You Are	Claire	TV movie
2015	Accidental Obsession	Lisa	TV movie
2015	Ungodly Acts	Sgt. King	TV movie
2015	Debbie Macomber's Dashing Through the Snow	Agent Hobbs	TV movie
2016	Colossal	Marie	
2017	Christmas in Evergreen	Hannah Turner	Hallmark Channel TV Movie
2018	One Winter Weekend	Megan Marquant	Hallmark Channel TV Movie
2018	Christmas in Evergreen : Letters to Santa	Hannah Turner	Hallmark Channel TV Movie
2019	One Winter Proposal	Megan Marquant	Hallmark Channel TV Movie
2019	Christmas in Evergreen : Tidings of Joy	Hannah Turner	Hallmark Channel TV Movie
2020	Hearts of Winter	Emerson	Hallmark Channel TV Movie
2020	Christmas in Evergreen : Bells are Ringing	Hannah Turner	Hallmark Channel TV Movie
2021	One Winter Wedding	Megan Marquant	Hallmark Channel TV Movie
2023	Float	Lena	

=== Television ===
Year	Title	Role	Notes
1999–2002	Undressed	Talia	
2002	Relic Hunter	Meg Ryerson	Episode: Warlock of Nu Theta Phi
2002	Spynet	Liza Carrington	
2002	Doc	Receptionist	Episode: "Love of the Game"
2004	This is Wonderland	Aisha	Episode: #1.2
2004	Blue Murder	Eva Jordan	Episode: "Blind Eye"
2005	Killer Instinct	Eden Cavanaugh	2 episodes
2006	Falcon Beach	Andrea Walters	2 episodes
2006	Eureka	IT Technician	Episode: "Primal"
2008	Sanctuary	Kayla Bradley	Episode: "Warriors"
2009	The L Word	Babysitter	Episode: "Lactose Intolerant"
2008–2009	The Stagers	Support Stager	11 episodes
2010	Stargate Universe	Airman Richmond	Episode: "Space"
2011	Fairly Legal	Susan Williams	Episode: "Pilot"
2011, 2017	Supernatural	Camille Thibideaux; Mia Vallens	Episode: "The Mentalists"; Episode: "The Big Empty"
2013	RL Stine's The Haunting Hour	Mrs. Stevenson	Episode: "Terrible Love"
2013	Primeval: New World	Lisa Merriweather	2 episodes
2013	Delete	Victoria "Tori" Mendes	2 episodes
2014	Witches of East End	Mrs. Jacobs	Episode: "Boogie Knight"
2014	Intruders	Karen	2 episodes
2015	Sorority Murder	Detective Sanchez	Television film
2015	The Returned	Pilar	Episode: "Camille"
2015	Gourmet Detective	Dee Dee	Episode: "The Gourmet Detective"
2015	Proof	Nurse #1	Episode: "Pilot"
2016–2021	Van Helsing	Doc	34 episodes Main role Nominated – Leo Award for Best Lead Performance by a Female in a Dramatic Series (2017)
2017	Travelers	Dr. Carroll	Episode: "Simon"
2019	The Magicians	"Ru, Queen of West Loria"	Episode: "The Serpent"
2019	Molly of Denali	Violetta Lawrence (voice)	Episode: "Visit Qyah"
2021	Nancy Drew	Val Samuels	4 episodes
2021–2023	Yellowjackets	Simone	Recurring
2026	The Audacity	Beatrice Webb	7 episodes
