= Courtney Eaton =

Australian actress (born 1996)

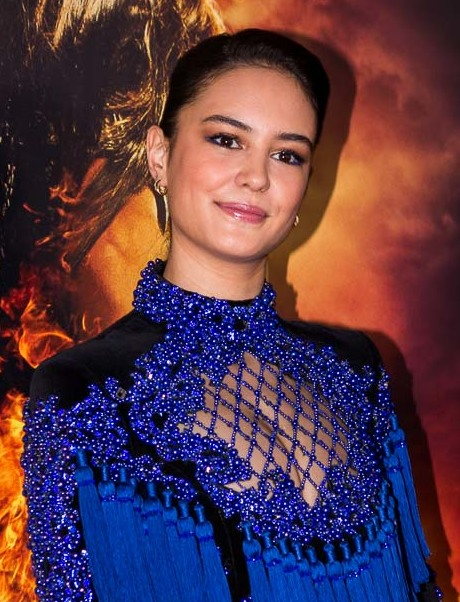
- Eaton in 2016
- Born: Courtney Jane Eaton; 6 January 1996 (age 30); Bunbury, Western Australia, Australia
- Occupations: Actress; model
- Years active: 2012–present

Courtney Jane Eaton (born 6 January 1996) is an Australian actress. She began her career as a model before making her acting debut in the post-apocalyptic action film Mad Max: Fury Road (2015). Eaton subsequently starred in the fantasy action film Gods of Egypt (2016). Since 2021, she has appeared in the Showtime thriller drama series Yellowjackets as young Lottie Matthews. She also starred in Parachute (2023).

== Early life ==
Courtney Jane Eaton was born on 6 January 1996 in Bunbury, Western Australia. Her father, Stephen Eaton, is a European-Australian IT consultant, while her mother is a New Zealander of Chinese, Cook Island and Māori descent. Eaton has a younger brother. She attended Bunbury Cathedral Grammar School.

== Career ==
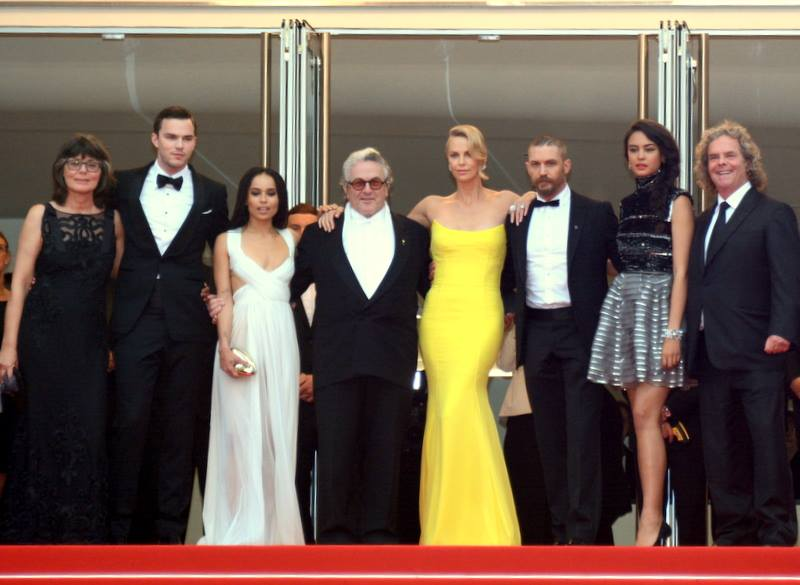
Eaton (second from right) with the cast and producers of Mad Max: Fury Road, 2015

Eaton was spotted by Christine Fox, head of Vivien's Models, in a fashion graduation at the age of 11. Fox signed up Eaton and prepared her to model at the age of 16. Eaton took part in an acting workshop with Myles Pollard as part of her modelling development and auditioned in Sydney for Mad Max: Fury Road (2015). She landed a part and co-starred in the film as Cheedo the Fragile, one of the five wives of Immortan Joe in the film. Of her part, Eaton said that Fragile is "the youngest of the [five] wives."

In December 2013, Eaton was cast in the fantasy action film Gods of Egypt (2016), as Zaya, a slave girl and love interest of one of the main characters (Brenton Thwaites), appearing alongside Gerard Butler and Nikolaj Coster-Waldau, under Alex Proyas' direction. In May 2016, it was announced that Eaton would be starring alongside Ross Lynch in the fantasy-comedy film Status Update. She starred alongside Aaron Eckhart in the action thriller Line of Duty, which was released in 2019. In December 2019, Eaton was cast in a recurring role as teenage Lottie in the American thriller drama television series Yellowjackets. She had originally auditioned for the role of Shauna, which went to Sophie Nélisse. For the second season of the show, Eaton has been made a series regular. In 2024, Eaton starred alongside Thomas Mann in the drama movie Parachute, which was the directorial debut of Brittany Snow.

In April 2025, the author of the book "Girl In Pieces," Kathleen Glasgow, confirmed that Eaton and her Yellowjackets co-star Sophie Nélisse bought the film rights to the book.

In September 2025, Eaton released her debut extended play (EP), Hush, distributed through DistroKid and produced by Tobias Jesso Jr. The five-track record includes “Growing Pains,” which was featured over the end credits of Brittany Snow’s 2023 directorial debut, "Parachute".

== Personal life ==
Eaton lives in Los Angeles, having moved to the United States in 2015. She dated footballer Callum Richardson from 2013 to 2015. She then went on to date her Status Update co-star Ross Lynch from 2015 to 2017. Eaton was also previously in relationships with fellow actor Nicholas Galitzine and cinematographer Spencer Goodall. She is a former vegan.

== Discography ==
=== EPs ===
- Hush (2025)

== Filmography ==
=== Film ===
Year	Title	Role	Notes
2015	Mad Max: Fury Road	Cheedo the Fragile	
2016	Gods of Egypt	Zaya	
2017	Newness	Blake Beeson	
2018	Status Update	Charlotte Alden	Direct-to-video film
2018	Perfect	Sarah	
2019	Line of Duty	Ava Brooks	
2023	Parachute	Riley Hart	
2026	Iconoclast	Nika	

=== Television ===
Year	Title	Role	Notes
2021–present	Yellowjackets	Teenage Charlotte "Lottie" Matthews	Recurring role (season 1); Main role (season 2—present)

== Awards and nominations ==
Year	Association	Category	Work	Result	Ref
2023	South by Southwest	Narrative Feature Special Jury Award for Performance	Parachute	Won	
2025	Hollywood Critics Association Awards	Breakthrough Actress Spotlight Award	Yellowjackets	Won	
