= Kevin Alves =

Figure skater

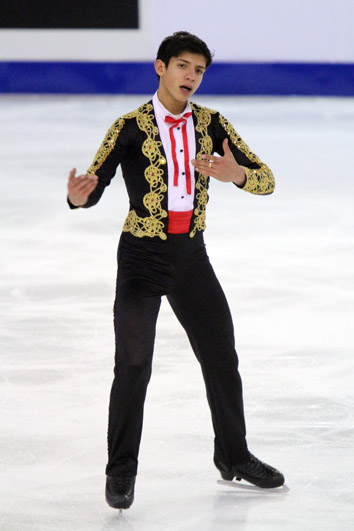
- Alves at the 2010 Junior World Championships

Personal information
- Full name: Kevin Alves
- Born: October 19, 1991 (age 35) Toronto, Ontario, Canada
- Home town: Newmarket, Ontario
- Height: 1.80 m (5 ft 11 in)

Figure skating career
- Country: Brazil (2007–12); Canada (until 2007)
- Discipline: Men's singles

Kevin Alves (born October 19, 1991) is a Canadian-Brazilian actor and former figure skater. He competed in the free skate at five ISU Championships. He is the first male skater to represent Brazil at an ISU Championship (2008 Four Continents) and the first Brazilian skater to appear in any discipline at the World Junior Championships (2008). As an actor, Alves currently stars in the Showtime series Yellowjackets (2021–present).

== Personal life ==
Alves was born on October 19, 1991, in Toronto and raised in Newmarket, Ontario. His mother is from Brazil and his father is from Portugal. In 2025, it was revealed that Alves was dating his Yellowjackets costar Alexa Barajas.

== Acting, directing and producing ==
Alves began modeling at the age of 12. At age 19 he began studying acting for film and television. Since then he has been acting in shows including Warehouse 13 and What's Up Warthogs. He has a role on Degrassi: The Next Generation playing Fab, a love interest to Tristan Milligan. In 2017, he plays newly arrived werewolf Bat in the second season of Shadowhunters. He portrayed Javi in Netflix series Locke & Key. Alves also has a starring role as Travis in the Showtime drama series Yellowjackets.

Towards the end of March 2024, Alves announced to Deadline his feature film directorial debut with Lucky Weekend. The film is a coming-of-age story, in which 18 year-old Gabe (Alves), who finds out his best friend has stolen his winning scratch ticket and wrangles a group of unlikely friends to help him steal it back before it is cashed in.

It was also announced in April 2024 that Alves will take on a recurring role in Netflix's eight episode comedy series No Good Deed.

In February 2025, Yellowjackets returned to Paramount+ with Showtime for a third season where Alves plays Travis Martinez for all 10 episodes.

== Skating career ==
Alves competed up through the junior level in the Canadian domestic competition structure. While he was a young skater, he discussed with his parents switching to compete for Brazil, his mother's country of origin. He switched to Brazil in 2007.

In the 2007–2008 season, Alves competed at the 2008 Four Continents Championships, becoming the first men's single skater to represent Brazil at an ISU Championship, and placed 26th. Later that month, he placed 36th at the 2008 World Junior Championships, and became the first skater to represent Brazil at the event.

In the 2008–2009 season, Alves made his debut on the ISU Junior Grand Prix. He placed 20th at the event in Courchevel, France, and 10th at the event in Cape Town, South Africa. He placed 16th at the 2009 Four Continents Championships and went on the following month to place 37th at the 2009 World Championships, where he became the first men's skater from Brazil to compete at the senior World level.

== Programs ==
Season	Short program	Free skating
2010–2012	Fosse medley	Carmen by Georges Bizet
2009–2010	Samba Hop by Hernani Raposo	Carmen by Georges Bizet
2008–2009	Samba Hop by Hernani Raposo	Spider-Man 2 by Danny Elfman
2007–2008	Carmen by Georges Bizet	Spider-Man 2 by Danny Elfman

== Competitive highlights ==
Competition placements at senior level
Season	2007–08	2008–09	2009–10	2010–11	2011–12	2012–13
World Championships		37th	27th			
Four Continents Championships	19th	16th	17th		23rd	
Egna Spring Trophy						7th
Nebelhorn Trophy			23rd			
Triglav Trophy						8th
Winter Universiade				19th		

- JGP – Event of the ISU Junior Grand Prix Series

Competition placements at junior level
Season	2007–08	2008–09	2009–10	2010–11
World Junior Championships	36th		19th	
JGP France		20th		10th
JGP Germany			22nd	
JGP South Africa		10th		
JGP United States			14th	

== Filmography ==
Year	Title	Role	Notes
2012	What's Up Warthogs	Warty the Mascot	Episode: "Inauguration Complication"
2012	Warehouse 13	Reggie	Episode: "There's Always a Downside"
2012	Degrassi: The Next Generation	Fab Juarez	
2015	The Expanse	Deck Cadet	Episode: "Dulcinea"
2017	Saving Hope	Fernando Esperanza	Episode: "Midlife Crisis"
2017–19	Shadowhunters	Bartholomew "Bat" Velasquez	Recurring role (seasons 2–3)
2020–21	Locke & Key	Javi	Recurring role (seasons 1–2)
2021	Two Sentence Horror Stories	Jackson	Episode: "Fix"
2021–present	Yellowjackets	Teenage Travis Martinez	Main role (season 2–present); recurring (season 1)
2024	No Good Deed	Nate	Recurring role
2026	Lucky Weekend	Gabe	Also writer, director
