= Liv Hewson =

Australian actor (born 1995)

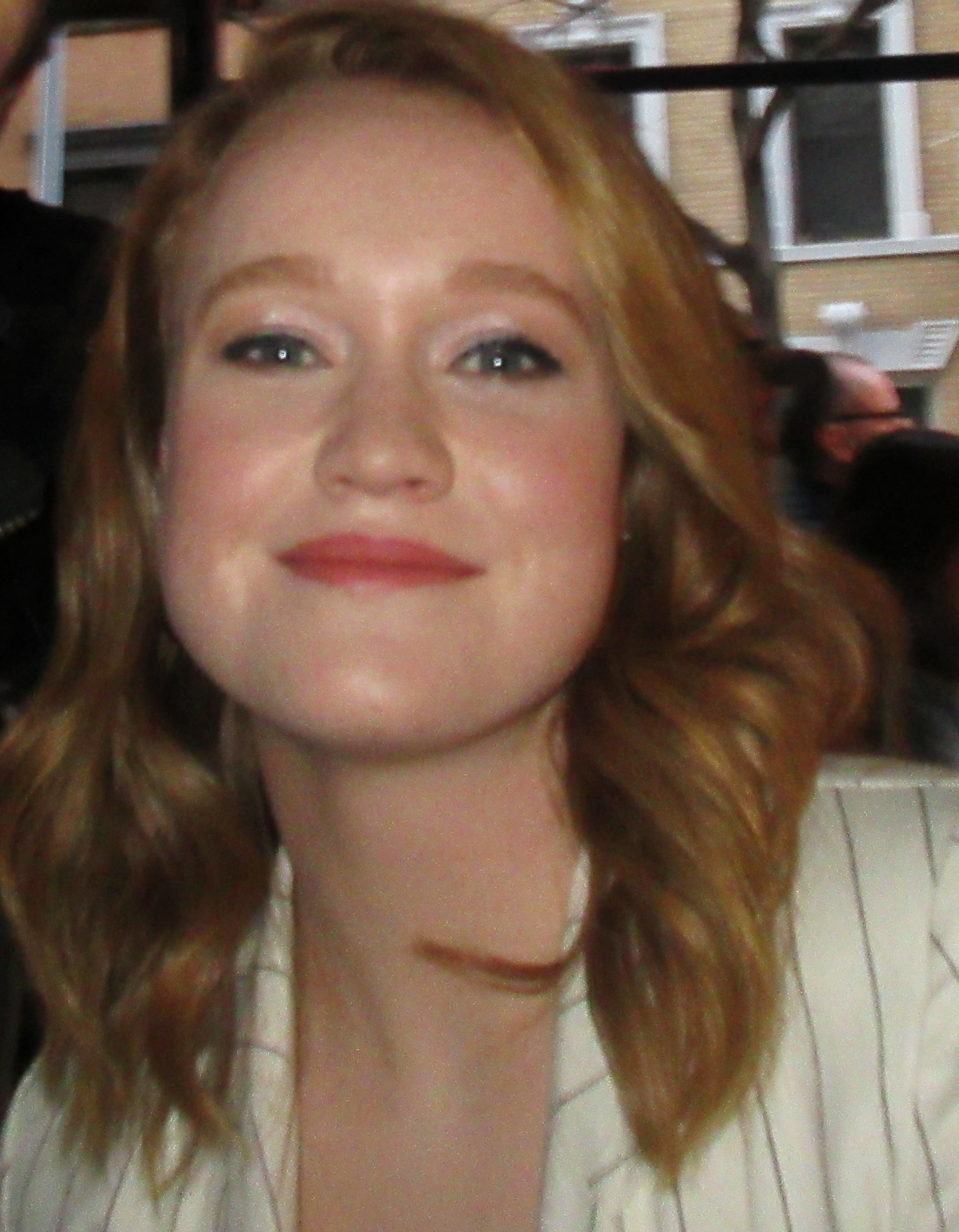
- Hewson in 2018
- Born: Canberra, Australian Capital Territory, Australia
- Occupations: Actor; playwright
- Years active: 2013–present
- Notable work: Abby Hammond on Santa Clarita Diet; Van Palmer on Yellowjackets
- Spouse: Lee Dalmazzi (m. 2026)

Liv Hewson is an Australian actor and playwright. They starred as Abby Hammond in the Netflix series Santa Clarita Diet from 2017 to 2019, and has portrayed Van Palmer in Yellowjackets since 2021.

== Early life and education ==
Liv Hewson was born around 1996 in Canberra. one of four children, with three brothers. Their mother, Angela, is a public servant and their father, Tony, is a psychologist. They grew up in the suburb of Hughes and attended Alfred Deakin High School and Canberra College.

Hewson began acting as part of the Canberra Youth Theatre. Growing up, the family watched a lot of American television shows, such as The Simpsons and Futurama, which Hewson later said made it easy to act with an American accent.

== Career ==
Hewson has written plays as well as acted in several TV series.

Hewson's play, Bona Mors, was produced by the Canberra Youth Theatre (CYT) in 2013 as part of Triptych — A Trilogy of New Works alongside Lachlan Philpott's Run! Rihanna! Run! and Jessica Bellamy's Fight or Flight. The three works were published as an anthology by Currency Press. They had been a member of CYT for three years in the lead-up to the production. Their written work includes "lots of re-imaginings of fairytales and mythology with a queer and dark slant."

In 2014, Hewson traveled to Los Angeles to attend an acting workshop. In 2016, they played the lead role of Claire Duncan in the fantasy web series Dramaworld.

In 2017, they starred in the film Before I Fall and had recurring roles in the second series of Top of the Lake and in the miniseries Inhumans. They played Abby Hammond in the Netflix series Santa Clarita Diet from 2017 to 2019, and has portrayed Van Palmer in Yellowjackets since 2021.

Hewson plays a lead role as detective Nell Buchanan, opposite Michael Dorman, in the Australian crime drama series Treasure & Dirt, made for ABC Television and the BBC, and premiering in Australia on 19 July 2026.

== Personal life ==
Around 2012, Hewson came out as non-binary at age 16. They are gay and use they/them pronouns. In 2020, Hewson received the Human Rights Campaign Visibility Award for their LGBT+ advocacy. In 2023, Hewson underwent gender affirming surgery, after years of considering it, after which they said they felt much happier.

In 2026, Hewson announced that they had married their partner, Lee Dalmazzi, whom they met on the set of the second season of Yellowjackets.

== Filmography ==
=== Film ===
| Year | Title | Role | Notes |
|---|---|---|---|
| 2013 | Alfonso Frisk | Fenny Frisk (older) | Short film |
| 2015 | Survey Says | Hillary | Short film |
| 2015 | So Romantic | Gurt | Short film |
| 2016 | Lets See How Fast This Baby Will Go | Gloria | Short film |
| 2017 | Before I Fall | Anna Cartullo | |
| 2018 | Puzzle | Nicki | |
| 2019 | Let It Snow | Dorrie | |
| 2019 | Bombshell | Lily | |
| 2020 | Under My Skin | Denny | |
| 2023 | Scarygirl | Bug-Eye (voice) | |
| 2025 | For Worse | Esther | |

=== Television ===
| Year | Title | Role | Notes |
|---|---|---|---|
| 2014 | I've Got No Legs | Liv | Unknown episodes |
| 2014–2015 | Do You Mind? | Gurt, Matilda, Lana | 3 episodes |
| 2016 | The Code | Elle | Episode: "Episode 6" (series finale) |
| 2016–2021 | Dramaworld | Claire Duncan | Lead role, 19 episodes |
| 2017 | Top of the Lake | Michaela | 3 episodes, recurring role (series 2) |
| 2017 | Inhumans | Audrey | 3 episodes, recurring role |
| 2017–2019 | Santa Clarita Diet | Abby Hammond | Series regular |
| 2018 | Back In Very Small Business | Ashley Piper | 8 episodes |
| 2021–present | Yellowjackets | Teenage Vanessa Palmer | Recurring (season 1); main (season 2–present) |
| 2023 | Party Down | Escapade | Episode: "Once Upon a Time Proms Away Prom-otional Event" |
| 2025 | He Had It Coming | Detective Shepherd | Main cast |
| 2025 | King of Drag | Themself | 1 episode, guest judge |
| 2026 | Among Us | Black (voice) | |
| 2026 | Treasure & Dirt | Nell Buchanan | Main cast |

=== Web series ===
| Year | Title | Role | Notes |
|---|---|---|---|
| 2018 | Homecoming Queens | Chloë Reeson | |
