= Jane Widdop =

American actor

- Occupation: Actor
- Years active: 2011–present
- Television: Yellowjackets

Jane Widdop is an American actor known for playing Laura Lee on Yellowjackets and Winnie Carruthers in the 2023 film It's a Wonderful Knife.

== Career ==
Widdop had a recurring role on the Amazon Prime Video teen sitcom The Kicks as Lily Padgett in 2016. That year they could also be seen on ABC series Making Moves as Kit. Widdop also made appearances on the sitcoms Speechless, Fresh Off the Boat, and 2 Broke Girls.

Widdop came to prominence playing Laura Lee in Yellowjackets. Following that performance, they were cast in the lead role of 2023 Christmas comedy-horror film It's a Wonderful Knife. In 2023, Widdop could also be seen in the third season of Octavia Spencer procedural Truth Be Told.

== Personal life ==
From Tennessee, Widdop was brought up attending Episcopal Church but considers themself more Wiccan in the present. Widdop is non-binary.

== Filmography ==
Year	Title	Role	Notes
2011	2 Broke Girls	Little blonde girl	Episode: "And the Very Christmas Thanksgiving"
2015	Murder in the First	Steffi McCormack	Episode: "State of the Union"
2016	Making Moves	Kit	5 episodes
2016	Jessica Darling's It List	Hope	Main role
2016	The Kicks	Lily Padgett	6 episodes
2017	Speechless	Girl	Episode: "S-u-r-Surprise"
2018	Fresh Off the Boat	Karen	Episode: "Big Baby"
2020	Deadly Daughter Switch	Breanne	Lead role
2020	Angie: Lost Girls	Angie Morgan	Lead role
2021–2023	Yellowjackets	Laura Lee	12 episodes
2023	Truth Be Told	Emily Mills	3 episodes
2023	It's a Wonderful Knife	Winnie Carruthers	Lead role
