= Erkko =

Erkko is a Finnish family known for their ownership of the newspaper Helsingin Sanomat.

== Family members ==
- J. H. Erkko (1849–1906), Finnish poet and playwright
- Eero Erkko (1860–1927), Finnish politician, journalist and the founder of Päivälehti, brother of J. H. Erkko
- Eljas Erkko (1895–1965), Finnish politician, journalist and the main owner of Sanoma, son of Eero Erkko
- Aatos Erkko (1932–2012), Finnish journalist and the main owner of Sanoma, son of Eljas Erkko
