= Apple Music =

Music streaming service by Apple

- Developer: Apple Inc.
- Key people: Oliver Schusser (VP, Apple Music & International Content); Brian Bumbery (director, Apple Music Publicity)
- Launched: June 30, 2015; 11 years ago
- Platforms: List of platforms: macOS; iOS; iPadOS; tvOS; watchOS; CarPlay; HomePod; HomeView; visionOS; Windows (Note: Available through iTunes or the Apple Music app on Windows 10 and above.); Android; ChromeOS; Google Nest; Amazon Echo; Sonos; PlayStation 5; Xbox; Tesla; Roku; Web
- Pricing model: Student: US$5.99/month; Individual: US$11.99/month (Note: Also available via an annual plan for US$109/year.); Family: US$16.99/month
- Availability: 172 countries
- Website: Home Page: apple.com/music; Web Player: music.apple.com

Apple Music is a music streaming service launched by Apple on June 30, 2015. The service is available in 172 countries and currently has over 100 million songs. Apple Music runs the free internet radio stations Apple Music 1, Apple Music Hits, Apple Music Country, Apple Música Uno, Apple Music Club, and Apple Music Chill which are broadcast live 24 hours a day.

Originally strictly a music service, Apple Music began expanding into video in 2016. Then-executive Jimmy Iovine stated that the intention for the service is to become a "cultural platform", and Apple reportedly wants the service to be a "one-stop shop for pop culture". The company is actively investing heavily in the production and purchasing of video content, both in terms of music videos and concert footage that support music releases, as well as web series and feature films.

Apple Music gained popularity rapidly after its launch, reaching 10 million subscribers in six months, and went on to reach 60 million subscribers in 2019.

As of May 2023, the most streamed song of all time on Apple Music is "Shape of You" by Ed Sheeran with more than 930 million plays worldwide.

== Features ==
Apple Music home screen for Android

Apple Music subscribers can create a profile to share their music with friends and follow other users to view the music they are listening to on a regular basis. Apple Music's use of iCloud, which matches a users' songs to those found on the service, allows users to combine their iTunes music library with their Apple Music library and listen to their music all in one place.

In 2018, alongside the release of iOS 12, Apple Music added the ability to search for a song by its lyrics.

Users also have the ability to view their most played songs, artists, and albums of the entire year through a feature called Apple Music replay. This feature tracks listening times down to the minute giving users accurate information on how much they may have listened to a specific song, artist, or album. The feature also tells the user specific genres that they listened to throughout the year, placing them in order from most listened-to least listened-to. Apple Music Replay also provides an interactive system where it plays a generated animation that recaps what the user's activity was like over the past year, along with a milestone section that shows specific goals they reached.

Audio quality options
Name	Bitrate
High Efficiency	HE-AAC (variable bitrate)
High Quality	AAC 256 kbit/s
Lossless	ALAC 16-bit/44.1kHz to 24-bit/48kHz
Hi-Res Lossless	ALAC 16-bit or 24-bit / 88.2kHz to 192kHz

== History ==
=== Pre-launch ===
Before Apple Music, the company's iPod and iTunes were known for having "revolutionized digital music." Former Apple CEO Steve Jobs was known to be opposed to the idea of music subscription services. When Apple bought audio equipment maker Beats Electronics in 2014, Apple gained ownership of Beats' own service Beats Music, and made Beats Music CEO Ian Rogers responsible for the iTunes Radio service. Business Insider later reported that Apple was planning to merge the two services. Apple also hired noted New Zealand born British radio DJ Zane Lowe to serve as a music curator.

Shortly before Apple Music was released, singer-songwriter Taylor Swift wrote an open letter publicly criticizing Apple's decision to not reimburse artists during a user's free trial period and announced that she would be holding back her album 1989 from the service. She said the policy was "unfair" as "Apple Music will not be paying writers, producers, or artists for those months". UK independent record label Beggars Group also criticized the trial period, saying it struggled "to see why rights owners and artists should bear this aspect of Apple's customer acquisition costs".

The day after Swift's letter, Apple Senior Vice President of Internet Software and Services Eddy Cue announced on Twitter that Apple had changed its policy, and that Apple Music "will pay artists for streaming, even during customers' free trial period". On Twitter, Swift wrote "After the events of this week, I've decided to put 1989 on Apple Music... And happily so". She concluded saying it was "the first time it's felt right in my gut to stream my album".

In negotiations with record labels for the new service, Apple allegedly attempted to encourage record labels to pull their content from the free, ad-supported tiers of competing services such as Spotify and Amazon Music in order to drive adoption of Apple Music and offered an incentive to Universal Music Group to pull its content from YouTube. The United States Department of Justice and Federal Trade Commission launched an investigation into this alleged cartel in May 2015.

=== Announcement and launch: 2015 ===
After rumors and anticipation, Sony Music CEO Doug Morris confirmed on June 7, 2015, that Apple had plans to announce a music streaming service, saying "It's happening tomorrow," with the launch later in the month. Morris emphasized several times that he prefers paid streaming as opposed to ad-supported, from a financial perspective. Furthermore, Morris said he expects the service to be the "tipping point" to accelerate the growth of streaming, along with arguing that Apple has "$178 billion dollars in the bank. And they have 800 million credit cards in iTunes." as opposed to Spotify, which "never really advertised because it's never been profitable". Morris further argued that "Apple will promote this like crazy and I think that will have a halo effect on the streaming business. A rising tide will lift all boats. It's the beginning of an amazing moment for our industry."

The announcement happened as the signature "one more thing..." reveal at Apple's conference. Hip hop artist Drake appeared onstage at the announcement event to elaborate on how he used the Connect platform, and Apple subsequently emphasized how "Independent music can share their music on Connect, too", in contrast to the iTunes Store, where small, independent artists were finding it difficult to participate.

Countries where Apple Music is available (as of September 2026)

Apple Music launched on June 30, 2015, in 100 countries. Earlier, new users used to receive a three-month free trial subscription, which changed to a monthly fee after three months. The trial lasts for a month now. A family plan allows six users to share a subscription at a reduced rate. Apple originally sought to enter the market at a lower price point for the service, but the music industry rejected the plan. The service debuted as an updated Music app on the iOS 8.4 update. Apple TV and Android device support was planned for a "fall" 2015 launch. A previously unreleased song by Pharrell Williams, entitled "Freedom", was used in promotional material and announced as an exclusive release on the launch of the service. The "History of Sound" advert for the launch of the Apple Music service was soundtracked by the tune There Is No Light by Wildbirds & Peacedrums, from their 2009 album The Snake. Upon its launch, Beats Music subscriptions and playlists were migrated to Apple Music, and the service was discontinued.

In October 2015, Drake and Apple signed a deal to release the music video for "Hotline Bling" exclusively on Apple Music. In December, Apple released an exclusive Taylor Swift tour documentary, called The 1989 World Tour, on Apple Music. In February 2016, The Hollywood Reporter reported that Dr. Dre would be starring in and executive producing a "dark semi-autobiographical drama" called Vital Signs. The production was described as "Apple's first scripted television series". Recode subsequently reported a few days later that the announcement of Dr. Dre's production was an effort to "extend Apple Music" in promotional ways rather than Apple actively exploring original television content. Citing Apple's deals with Drake and Swift in October and December 2015, respectively, the report referenced a Twitter user describing Apple's efforts as "content marketing".

In November 2015, Apple launched the Android version of Apple Music, touted by reporters as Apple's first "real" or "user-centric" Android app. The app was updated in April 2017 to match the service's iOS 10 design.

=== 2016 ===
In January 2016, Fortune reported that, six months after launching, Apple Music had reached 10 million paying subscribers, having spent six months reaching the same customer base that took competing music streaming service Spotify six years. This customer base increased to 11 million subscribers in February, 13 million in April, 15 million in June, 17 million in September, 20 million in December, 27 million in June 2017, 36 million in February 2018, 38 million in March 2018 (just five weeks after the previous milestone), 40 million in April 2018, 50 million as of May 2018, 56 million as of December 2018, and 60 million as of June 2019.

In February 2016, Music Business Worldwide reported that, with Apple Music having launched in Turkey and Taiwan in the previous week, the service was available in 113 countries. The publication further wrote that those countries accounted for 59 regions that competing service Spotify did not. In August 2016, Apple Music was launched in Israel and South Korea.

In May 2016, a student membership was announced, that discounted the regular price of a subscription by 50%. The student plan was initially only available for eligible students in the United States, United Kingdom, Germany, Denmark, Ireland, Australia, and New Zealand, but was expanded to an additional 25 countries in November 2016.

In July 2016, Apple bought Carpool Karaoke from The Late Late Show with James Corden, with Variety writing that Apple was planning to distribute the series through Apple Music. Apple's adaptation of the series was originally supposed to premiere in April 2017, but was delayed without explanation. The series instead premiered on August 8, 2017.

Apple added personalized music playlists to the service, with the September 2016 launch of "My New Music Mix", and the June 2017 launch of "My Chill Mix".

=== 2017 ===
In January 2017, The Wall Street Journal reported that Apple was exploring original video content, including its own television series and movies. A few days later, Apple Music executive Jimmy Iovine confirmed the reports about the move towards video, and in February, he announced that Apple Music would launch its first two television-style series in 2017, with the aim to turn Apple Music into a "cultural platform".

In March 2017, The Information reported that Apple had recently hired several people to help evolve its video platform, including YouTube product manager Shiva Rajaraman.

In April 2017, it was announced that Apple Music would be the exclusive home to Sean Combs's documentary "Can't Stop, Won't Stop: A Bad Boy Story", which premiered June 25. On the same day, Bloomberg Businessweek reported that artist Will.i.am would make a reality show for Apple Music, in an effort to turn the service into a "one-stop shop for pop culture". The reality show was later revealed to be called Planet of the Apps, and will focus on the "app economy". The series has cast 100 developers, and premiered on June 6, 2017.

In June 2017, Apple hired two television executives from Sony, Jamie Erlicht and Zack Van Amburg. The two have jointly held the title of "President" at Sony, and have helped develop shows including Breaking Bad and Shark Tank. The hiring was noted by the media as another significant effort by Apple to expand into original video productions.

In early December 2017, Apple hired Michelle Lee, a programming veteran, as a creative executive of Apple's original video team, and a few days later, also hired Philip Matthys and Jennifer Wang Grazier from Hulu and Legendary Entertainment, respectively.

=== 2018 ===
On November 30, 2018, Apple added support for Apple Music on Amazon Echo speakers, after previously only being accessible on Apple's own HomePod speakers.

On December 13, 2018, Apple discontinued Apple Music's "Connect" feature in favor for their redesigned approach to artist profiles and the ability for users to share their music and playlists with friends and followers introduced in iOS 11.

=== 2019 ===
On September 5, 2019, Apple released the first version of an Apple Music web player in beta. The web player gives users full access to their music libraries along with similar features from the Apple Music app, while it is missing key features that are expected to be added later. A Windows 11 app was released in beta in January 2023, to replace the aging iTunes for Windows.

At Apple's WWDC for IOS 13, Apple revealed time-synced lyrics in Apple Music powered by both Musixmatch and Genius, Apple also released syllable-lyrics, where they scroll across the screen as it's sung later.

On November 15, 2019, Apple released a new Apple Music feature called Apple Music Replay, which is a year-end playlist showing users the tracks, artists, genres, and albums they have listened to the most over the entire year, a feature similar to Spotify Wrapped. It has since been updated so that users can view monthly listening statistics in addition to year-end. On November 20, 2019, Apple introduced Apple Music for Business, offering customized playlists for partnered retailers, while also revealing that the platform's catalog now hosted over 60 million songs.

=== 2020 ===
In 2020, Apple Music sealed deals with Universal Music Group, Sony Music and Warner Music Group for further promotion and streaming allowance of songs from artists on their labels.

On April 21, 2020, Apple announced that Apple Music would be expanding to an additional 52 countries around the world bringing the total to 167 worldwide.

On October 19, 2020, Apple launched Apple Music TV via Apple Music and the Apple TV app in the United States. Apple Music TV is a free, continuous 24/7 livestream focused on music videos, akin to the early days of MTV. Apple Music TV plans on having premieres of new music videos occur every Friday at 12 PM ET, as well as occasional artist and themed takeovers, airings of Apple Music original documentaries and films, live events and shows, and chart countdowns. The service launched with a countdown of the 100 most streamed songs in the US of all time on Apple Music.

On October 19, 2020, Apple launched Apple Music TV via Apple Music and the Apple TV app in the United States. Apple Music TV is a free, continuous 24/7 livestream focused on music videos, akin to the early days of MTV. Apple Music TV plans on having premieres of new music videos occur every Friday at 12PM ET, as well as occasional artist and themed takeovers, airings of Apple Music original documentaries and films, live events and shows, and chart countdowns. The service launched with a countdown of the 100 most streamed songs in the US of all time on Apple Music.

From October 30, 2020, Apple Music was included in the Apple One bundle along with several other Apple services such as News, iCloud, Arcade, and TV Plus.

=== 2021 ===
On May 17, 2021, Apple announced that Apple Music would begin offering lossless audio via the ALAC codec in June 2021, along with music mixed in Dolby Atmos, all at no additional cost to Apple Music subscribers. In July 2021, the Android version of the app also received support for lossless and spatial audio with Dolby Atmos, though the features were not mentioned in the update release notes. By December 28, 2021, Apple Music had upgraded its entire catalogue of 90 million tracks to have lossless audio.

On October 19, 2021, Apple introduced the discounted Apple Music Voice plan at $4.99/month, which limits subscribers to only accessing the service's music library and playback features through Siri. The plan was later discontinued on November 1, 2023, with no explanation.

On October 27, 2021, Sony announced that Apple Music would become available on the PlayStation 5.

=== 2022 ===
On May 17, 2022, Apple Music announced Apple Music Live, a new concert series that kicked off with Harry Styles live from New York on May 20.

On June 24, 2022, Apple Music increased the price of its student plan, available for eligible college students, from $4.99 to $5.99 per month in the U.S. It represented the first price increase for any plan since Apple Music's launch in the country. Similar price increases also occurred to student plans in the U.K. and Canada at the same time.

On September 22, 2022, Apple announced that it has signed a multi-year deal with the NFL to have Apple Music become the main sponsor of the Super Bowl halftime show beginning with Super Bowl LVII.

On October 12, 2022, Apple Music became available for the Xbox One and Xbox Series X/S.

On October 24, 2022, Apple announced it was to increase pricing of standard Apple Music subscriptions (along with Apple TV+ and Apple One) in many regions. The Individual plan increased $1 to $10.99/month, the Family plan increased $2 to $16.99/month, and the Annual plan for individuals increased $10 to $109/year.

With the release of iOS 16.2 on December 13, 2022, Apple introduced the "Apple Music Sing" karaoke feature, which introduces real-time lyrics and on supported devices a new slider which allows for the volume of vocals to be adjusted independently from a track's instrumentals on supported songs.

=== 2024 ===
Apple partnered with Bharti Airtel to provide its music and video streaming services to the telecom company's premium clients in India from 2024 at no cost.

In February 2024, Djay added support for DJing with tracks from Apple Music on MacOS, Windows, Android, iPad, iPhone, and Vision Pro. In March 2025, Apple announced "DJ with Apple Music", expanding compatibility with DJ software to Rekordbox, Serato, and Engine DJ and adding support for some stand-alone DJ hardware from AlphaTheta (OMNIS-DUO and XDJ-AZ), Denon, and Numark. However, stem mixing functionality is disabled with streaming music.

=== 2025 ===
As of August 2025, Apple Music had 94 million subscribers.

In 2025, Apple Music added a music transfer tool that allows users to import playlists from other services such as Spotify and YouTube Music, in partnership with the third-party service SongShift.

=== 2026 ===
In February 2026, Apple Music introduced AI-generated playlists, based on specific prompts like genre or mood. The interface of the app was also redesigned, in line with the Liquid Glass design language of iOS 26. Additional features such as real-time translation for bi-lingual songs and playback analytics were also added.

On September 30, 2026, Apple Music availability was expanded to Albania, Brunei, Burkina Faso, and Pakistan. This marked the first major expansion since 2020 and brought the service to a total of 172 countries and regions.

On October 21, 2026, Apple Music officially unveiled a comprehensive global rebrand and updated visual identity, which includes new slogan "Made By Sound", alongside a new logo in bold with lowercase letters. In addition, a black and white minimalist color scheme was introduced, as well as a new app icon in those colors.

== Apple Music Classical ==
Apple Music Classical
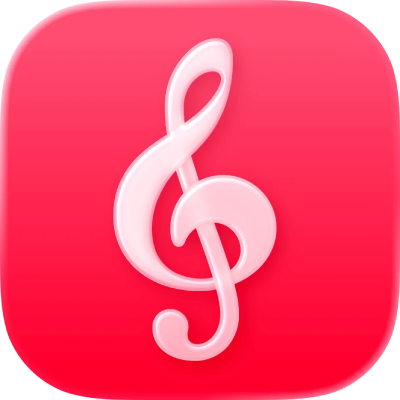

- Screenshot of the Apple Music Classical app on Android 15
- Developer: Apple Inc.
- Launched: March 28, 2023; 3 years ago
- Platforms: iOS; iPadOS; Android; Web
- Pricing model: Included with Apple Music subscription
- Availability: 161 countries
- Website: classical.music.apple.com

On August 13, 2021, Apple acquired classical music streaming service Primephonic, and announced that it would become the basis for a new Apple Music app dedicated to classical music, planned to launch in 2022.

In March 2023 Apple released Apple Music Classical on iOS, after announcing the service in 2021. Apple Music Classical is included with an Apple Music subscription. It focuses on classical music, whereas Apple Music has varying genres of music. The Android app was released on May 30, 2023; and the iPad app was released on November 16, 2023.

On September 5, 2023, Apple acquired the classical music label BIS Records.

== Apple Music Awards ==
#	Year	Global Artist	Breakthrough Artist	Songwriter(s)	Album	Song	Regional Artist	Ref.
1	2019	Billie Eilish	Lizzo	Billie Eilish, Finneas O'Connell	When We All Fall Asleep, Where Do We Go? by Billie Eilish	"Old Town Road" by Lil Nas X	—N/a	
2	2020	Lil Baby	Megan Thee Stallion	Taylor Swift	Please Excuse Me for Being Antisocial by Roddy Ricch	"The Box" by Roddy Ricch	—N/a	
3	2021	The Weeknd	Olivia Rodrigo	H.E.R.	Sour by Olivia Rodrigo	"Drivers License" by Olivia Rodrigo	Wizkid (Nigeria); Aya Nakamura (France); RIN (Germany); Official Hige Dandism (Japan); Scriptonite (Russia)	
4	2022	Bad Bunny	—N/a					
5	2023	Taylor Swift	—N/a					
6	2024	Billie Eilish	—N/a					
7	2025	Tyler, the Creator	—N/a					
8	2026	Olivia Dean	—					

== Production library ==
=== Series ===
Series	Aired	Showrunner(s)	Production partner(s)	Original network	Notes
Former
We the Best TV	2016	DJ Khaled	Apple Music; We the Best Music Group	Apple Music Connect	We the Best TV premiered on February 5, 2016, featuring DJ Khaled and artists signed to his label. Positioned as a reality show, it also included personal footage, as well as interviews with Khaled's industry friends and collaborators. A companion radio station on Beats 1 called We the Best Radio aired simultaneously.
The Score	2016	Shane Smith, Spike Jonze, Suroosh Alvi	Apple Music; Vice Media	Apple Music	The Score was a six-episode series dedicated to exploring local music scenes and cultures around the world. It premiered on March 22, 2016. Each episode comes with a curated playlist related to the artists featured in the show.
Planet of the Apps	2017	Charles Watcher, Craig Armstrong, Rick Ringbakk	5x5 Media; Apple Music; Lightspeed Venture Partners	Apple Music	Planet of the Apps is a reality television show where software developers are tasked to pitch their ideas in front of judges on a slow-moving escalator. Winners will get funding directly from LSVP. The show premiered on June 6, 2017, to mixed reviews. The series was cancelled after one season.
Carpool Karaoke: The Series	2017–2023	Ben Winston, Eric Pankowski, James Corden	Apple Music; Fulwell 73 Productions	Apple Music	Carpool Karaoke: The Series is a reality television show that originated from the segment of the same name on The Late Late Show with James Corden. Apple bought the worldwide rights to it from CBS in 2016 and adapted it exclusively for Apple Music subscribers. The series premiered on August 9, 2017.
Ongoing
Up Next	2017–present	Jimmy Iovine, Zane Lowe	Apple Music	Apple Music	Up Next premiered on August 16, 2017. The series focuses on new and upcoming artists, chronicling their journey, inspiration and influences. Each season of the mini-documentary ends with interviews and live performances called Up Next Sessions.

=== Feature films ===
Film	U.S. release date	Directors(s)	Screenwriter(s)	Producer(s)	Studio(s)
The 1989 World Tour Live	December 20, 2015	Jonas Åkerlund	Violaine Etienne	Scott Horan, Taylor Swift	Apple Music, Dirty Hit
Beats 1 Presents: The 1975	February 25, 2016	Matty Healy, Zane Lowe	Matty Healy, Zane Lowe	Matty Healy, Zane Lowe	Apple Music, Beats 1, Dirty Hit
Please Forgive Me	September 26, 2016	Anthony Mandler	Anthony Mandler, Larry Jackson	Larry Jackson, Kim Bradshaw	Apple Music, Dirty Hit
Skepta: Live from London	December 3, 2016	Joseph Adenuga	Joseph Adenuga	Joseph Adenuga	Apple Music, Boy Better Know
808	December 9, 2016	Alexander Dunn	Alexander Dunn, Luke Bainbridge	Alexander Dunn, Arthur Baker, Craig Kallman, Alex Noyer	Apple Music, Atlantic Films, You Know Films
Skepta: Greatness Only	December 19, 2016	Matt Walker, Tom Knight	Joseph Adenuga	Joseph Adenuga, Julie Adenuga	Apple Music, Boy Better Know
Process	March 31, 2017	Kahlil Joseph	Kahlil Joseph	Onye Anyanwu, Rik Green	Apple Music, Pulse Films, Young Turks
Harry Styles: Behind the Album	May 15, 2017	Harry Styles, Paul Dugdale	Harry Styles, Paul Dugdale	Harry Styles, Paul Dugdale	Apple Music, Erskine Records
Ti Amo Speciale	June 7, 2017	Warren Fu	Jona Ward, Warren Fu	Christian Mazzalai, Deck d'Arcy, Laurent Brancowitz, Thomas Mars	Apple Music, Partizan Entertainment
Can't Stop, Won't Stop: A Bad Boy Story	June 25, 2017	Daniel Kaufman	Daniel Kaufman	Andre Harrell, Heather Parry, Sean Combs	Apple Music, Live Nation Productions
HAIM: Behind the Album	July 14, 2017	Paul Dugdale	Paul Dugdale	Paul Dugdale	Apple Music, Pulse Films
Kygo: Stole the Show	July 26, 2017	Matt Mitchener	Matt Mitchener	Devin Chanda, Kyrre Gørvell-Dahll	Apple Music, Ultra Enterprises
Clive Davis: The Soundtrack of Our Lives	October 3, 2017	Chris Perkel	Chris Perkel	Blake Everhart, David Diliberto, David Schulhof, Deborah Zipser, Mary Lisio, Michael Bernstein, Ridley Scott, Samantha Kerzner, Susan Ricketts	Apple Music, IM Global, Scott Free Productions

== Reception ==
Apple Music received mixed reviews at launch. Among the criticism, reviewers wrote that the user interface was "not intuitive", and an "embarrassing and confusing mess". They also wrote about battery life problems. However, the service was praised for its smart functions. Christina Warren of Mashable noted the emphasis on human curation in Apple Music, pointing out the various human-curated radio stations and the accuracy of the curated playlists recommended to users in the "For Me" section. The author concluded saying "[The] For Me section alone has made me excited about music for the first time in a long time." Sam Machkovech of Ars Technica wrote that Apple's emphasis on unsigned artist participation in the Connect feature could be an effort to restore the company's former reputation as a "tastemaker" in the mid-2000s.

Apple Music's major redesign in iOS 10 received more positive reviews. Caitlin McGarry of Macworld praised Apple for having "cleaned up the clutter, reconsidered the navigation tools, put your library front and center, and added algorithmically created playlists to rival Spotify's." She noted bigger fonts, large amounts of white space, and she welcomed changes to various functionalities, concluding with the statement that "Apple Music's redesign is a huge improvement over its previous incarnation, and a clear sign that Apple is listening to its customers". However, another Macworld editor, Oscar Raymundo, criticized the new design, writing that "Apple Music in iOS 10 is not as elegant or intuitive as Apple promised. The music service added more needless options, key actions like repeat got buried, and the For You section leaves a lot to be desired". Jordan Novet of VentureBeat wrote positively about the changes, stating "Apple has improved the overall design, as well as the experience".

In December 2017, singer-songwriter Neil Young released a new archive as part of his Neil Young Archives project and criticized Apple for the audio quality offered by its Apple Music streaming service, stating: "Apple Music controls the audio quality that is served to the masses and chooses to not make high quality available, reducing audio quality to between 5 percent and 20 percent of the master I made in the studio in all cases. So, the people hear 5 percent to 20 percent of what I created. ... Apple not offering a top-quality tier has led labels to stop making quality products available to the masses". Young's claim, however, did not stand up to technical scrutiny, with Apple delivering an industry-standard high-quality bitrate of 256 kbit/s AAC, slightly edging out Spotify in quality, which uses a 320 kbit/s Ogg Vorbis bitrate.

=== iCloud matching technology controversy ===
The implementation of iCloud Music Library caused significant issues for users. There were reports about music libraries being impacted by issues such as tracks moved to other albums, album art not matching the music, duplicate artists and songs, missing tracks, and synchronization problems. Mashable wrote that "Apple has not yet publicly acknowledged the problem or responded to our request for comment".

iCloud Music Library has also been reported to delete music from users' local storage, though this has been disputed by other publications as caused by user error or another application. Additionally, the feature was reported to have replaced uploaded content with a version locked with digital rights management. In July 2016, Apple switched the matching technology to incorporate features identical to iTunes Match, specifically the use of "audio fingerprints" to scan sound data. The new technology also removed DRM from downloaded matched songs.

=== Album exclusives controversy ===
In August 2016, Frank Ocean released Blonde exclusively on Apple Music. The decision was made by Ocean independently, without Def Jam Recordings, his former label, being a part of the deal. The exclusive deal reportedly "ignited a music streaming war". The move followed in the footsteps of other artists, including Adele, Coldplay, Future, Drake, Beyoncé, Rihanna, and Kanye West, who released albums on exclusive terms with music streaming competitors of leading service Spotify. Jonathan Prince, Spotify's head of communications, told The Verge that "We're not really in the business of paying for exclusives, because we think they're bad for artists and they're bad for fans. Artists want as many fans as possible to hear their music, and fans want to be able to hear whatever they're excited about or interested in — exclusives get in the way of that for both sides. Of course, we understand that short promotional exclusives are common and we don't have an absolute policy against them, but we definitely think the best practice for everybody is wide release". After a 2-week period, Blonde was released on Spotify.

Ocean's independent move to Apple Music exclusivity caused "a major fight in the music industry", and Universal Music Group reportedly banned the practice of exclusive releases for its signed artists. Soon after, several major record labels followed Universal, marking a significant change in the industry. According to unnamed label executives, Spotify had also introduced a new policy that said that the service would not give the same level of promotion once an album arrives on Spotify after other services, including not being prominently featured in playlists. Rolling Stone wrote in October 2016 that "if you wanted to keep up with new albums by Beyoncé, Drake, Frank Ocean, and Kanye West, among many others, you would have had to subscribe to not one but two streaming services", adding, "But over the past few months, a backlash has developed against this new reality". Lady Gaga told Apple Music's Beats 1 radio, "I told my label that if they signed those contracts with Apple Music and Tidal, I'd leak all my own new music".

In May 2017, Apple Music executive Jimmy Iovine told Music Business Worldwide, "We tried it. We'll still do some stuff with the occasional artist. The labels don't seem to like it and ultimately it's their content."

== See also ==
- Apple Music 1 – Apple Music's live radio station
- iTunes Radio – Apple's discontinued free radio service within the Music app
- Comparison of music streaming services
- List of Internet radio stations
- List of online music databases
