= Alex Noyer =

French-Finnish filmmaker (born 1980)

- Born: 1980 (age 45–46); Paris, France
- Citizenship: Finland; France
- Occupation: Filmmaker
- Years active: 2009–present
- Notable work: 808; Sound of Violence; Love Is the Monster
- Relatives: Rafaela Seppälä (mother); Patricia Seppälä (maternal grandmother); Richard Seppälä (maternal grandfather); Philippe Noyer (paternal grandfather)

Alex Noyer (born 1980) is a French-Finnish film director, screenwriter and producer. He produced the music documentary 808 (2015), about the influence of the Roland TR-808 drum machine, before moving into narrative filmmaking. He made his feature directorial debut with the horror film Sound of Violence (2021), which premiered at South by Southwest.

== Early life ==
Noyer was born in Paris, France, to Finnish businesswoman Rafaela Seppälä and French painter Denis Paul Noyer. Photojournalist Patricia Seppälä (née Erkko) and diplomat Richard Seppälä were his maternal grandparents, and artist Philippe Noyer was his paternal grandfather. Noyer lived in Paris until he moved to Finland in his early 20s to complete his mandatory military service. After his military service, he has lived in France, the United Kingdom and the United States.

== Career ==
Noyer developed the idea for 808, the documentary he produced about the Roland TR-808, a production that took several years to develop. It premiered at South by Southwest in 2015 and was presented at the Rock and Roll Hall of Fame in Cleveland. In 2016, his planned feature directorial debut, Sielu, was being developed as a Finland–United States co-production. His short film Conductor led to the development of his first feature, Sound of Violence.

=== Sound of Violence ===
Noyer wrote, directed and produced Sound of Violence, starring Jasmin Savoy Brown, Lili Simmons and James Jagger. It premiered in the Midnighters section of the 2021 South by Southwest festival. He said the project came from his experience on 808 and his desire to work in the horror genre. The film received mixed-to-positive reviews.

=== Later work ===
Noyer later directed Love Is the Monster, a horror film drawing on Finnish mythology. In 2025, he directed the drama These Little Ones Perish, an adaptation by Patrick Hamilton. Production happened in New York after Noyer lost his home in the Palisades Fire.

== Filmography ==
=== Film ===
Year	Title	Director	Writer	Producer
2015	808	No	No	Yes
2021	Sound of Violence	Yes	Yes	Yes
2025	Love Is the Monster	Yes	Yes	Yes
2025	These Little Ones Perish	Yes	No	Yes

=== Short film ===
Year	Title	Director	Writer
2018	Conductor	Yes	Yes
