= Sound of Violence =

2021 film by Alex Noyer

- Official release poster
- Directed by: Alex Noyer
- Written by: Alex Noyer
- Based on: Conductor by Alex Noyer
- Produced by: Hannu Aukia; Alex Noyer
- Starring: Jasmin Savoy Brown; Lili Simmons; James Jagger
- Cinematography: Daphne Qin Wu
- Edited by: Hannu Aukia; Verti Virkajärvi
- Music by: Jaakko Manninen; Alexander Burke; Omar El-Deeb
- Production companies: You Know Films; No Office
- Distributed by: Gravitas Ventures
- Release dates: March 19, 2021 (SXSW); May 21, 2021 (United States)
- Running time: 94 minutes
- Countries: United States; Finland
- Language: English

Sound of Violence is a 2021 Finnish-American slasher film written and directed by Alex Noyer in his directorial debut, inspired by his short film Conductor. The film stars Jasmin Savoy Brown as a formerly deaf girl who goes on a killing spree after witnessing the murder of her family. The film was released on May 21, 2021 by Gravitas Ventures after its world premiere on March 19, 2021 at the SXSW Film Festival.

== Plot ==
Alexis, who has recovered her hearing after witnessing the brutal murder of her family at the age of ten, has synesthetic abilities awakened in her and starts a journey of self-discovery through the healing music of brutal violence. In pursuit of a career through experimenting with new sounds, Alexis enlists the help of her loving roommate, Marie, who is unaware of the dark purpose behind Alexis's actions and the part she is unknowingly playing. Faced with the likelihood of losing her hearing again, Alexis begins a rampage to create her masterpiece, not letting anything, not even love, get in her way.

== Cast ==
- Jasmin Savoy Brown as Alexis Reeves
  - Kamia Benge as young Alexis Reeves
- Lili Simmons as Marie Sotker
- James Jagger as Duke
- Tessa Munro as Sonya Fuentes
- Dana L. Wilson as Mrs. Reeves
- Wes McGee as Barry Reeves
- Mataeo Mingo as Kevin Reeves
- Corsica Wilson as Officer Davis
- James Wellington as Fred
- Brian Huskey as Mr. Bell

== Production ==
In 2018, Alex Noyer, who previously produced the 2015 documentary film 808, wrote and directed a short film entitled Conductor, centering on a music engineer who helps a young musician compose music for a once-in-lifetime competition. The short went on to screen at multiple small horror film festivals.

The feature was first announced on October 28, 2019, with Noyer creating a new take on his short film. Noyer wrote the screenplay and was set to make his directorial debut on the film, with Noyer also producing the film alongside Hannu Aukia, a producer on the original short. Alongside the initial announcement, Jasmin Savoy Brown, Lili Simmons, and newcomer James Jagger were cast in main roles. On November 20, 2019, Tessa Munro joined the cast.

The film began principal photography on September 30, 2019 in Los Angeles.

== Release ==
The film had its world premiere at the SXSW Film Festival on March 19, 2021 as part of the Midnighters section. On February 11, 2021, it was announced that Gravitas Ventures had acquired North American distribution rights to the film with a release date of May 21, 2021. The film was given a limited theatrical release as well as a simultaneous digital release via premium video on demand.

== Reception ==
On review aggregator Rotten Tomatoes, the film has a fresh rating of 66% from 38 critic reviews with an average rating of 6.3/10. The site's consensus reads, "The consistency isn't always smooth, but Sound Of Violence's blend of character study and horror marks writer-director Alex Noyer as an ambitious, visually distinctive filmmaker". The film holds an average score of 45 based on 4 critic reviews on Metacritic, indicating mixed or average review.

Critics commended Noyer's direction and ability to tell a story beyond the "unapologetic gore" prevalent throughout the film. Variety's Jessica Kiang said that, "With its themes of creative obsession and trauma recycled as psychopathy, not to mention Alexis' synesthesia giving license for lurid, semi-abstract, technicolor visual sequences, "Sound of Violence" boasts perhaps the greatest giallo premise that Dario Argento never dreamed up." The critic also praised the "spectacularly gruesome and grotesquely elaborate murder scenes" and "a lead performance that oozes empathy as much as her hapless victims ooze blood", but criticized the "discernible" emotional impact and stated that the "[murder scenes] do ample justice to even the most revered of its slasher forebears". In a more positive review, Kristy Puchko of RogerEbert.com describes the film as a "true midnight movie", writing that "Noyer bathes the screen in pulsing blues, reds, oranges, and greens. The smash of a skull, the tear of flesh, and the splurt of blood are not just disturbing visual effects. They become translated into an abstract and enchanting boom of aural awe."

== See also ==
- Love is the Monster
