= Viikkosanomat =

Finnish news magazine (1922–1975)

- Categories: News magazine
- Frequency: Weekly
- Founded: 1922
- Final issue: 1975
- Country: Finland
- Based in: Helsinki
- Language: Finnish
- ISSN: 0042-6113
- OCLC: 487968063

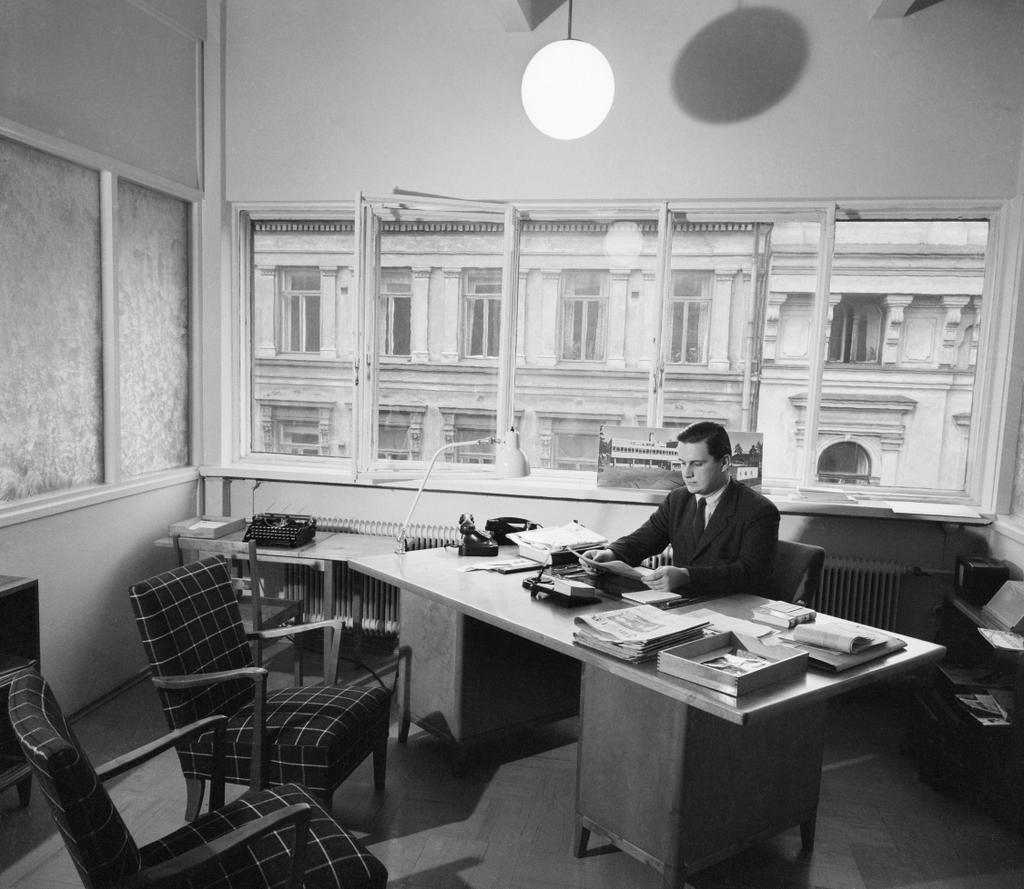
Aatos Erkko editor in chief of Viikkosanomat

Viikkosanomat was an illustrated weekly news magazine in Finland which was published between 1922 and 1975. During its lifetime it was one of the most read magazines in the country.

== History and profile ==
The magazine was started in 1922 under the title Viikko-Sanomat as the official media outlet of the Economic Enlightenment Center and was distributed to the trailers who were members of the organization. It was acquired by the Finnish media company Sanoma in 1930 and was renamed as Viikkosanomat. The magazine was published on a weekly basis. It contained articles and travel stories which were accompanied by photographs. Viikkosanomat featured numerous literary stories in the 1950s.

One of its editors-in-chief was Aatos Erkko who served in the post in the 1950s. The magazine was among the pro-Western and anti-communist periodicals in Finland. It was the only Finnish publication which uncovered the killing of Hungarians during the Hungarian Uprising in 1956. These news reports were written by Simopekka Nortamo, future editor-in-chief of Helsingin Sanomat. He received a grant from the Americans after these reports.

Viikkosanomat enjoyed highest circulation levels in the period between 1952 and 1954. The magazine folded in 1975.
