= Battle of Ruovesi =

1918 battle of the Finnish Civil War

Coordinates: 61.896865°N 24.106484°E

- Part of the Finnish Civil War in the Russian Civil War and Eastern Front of World War I
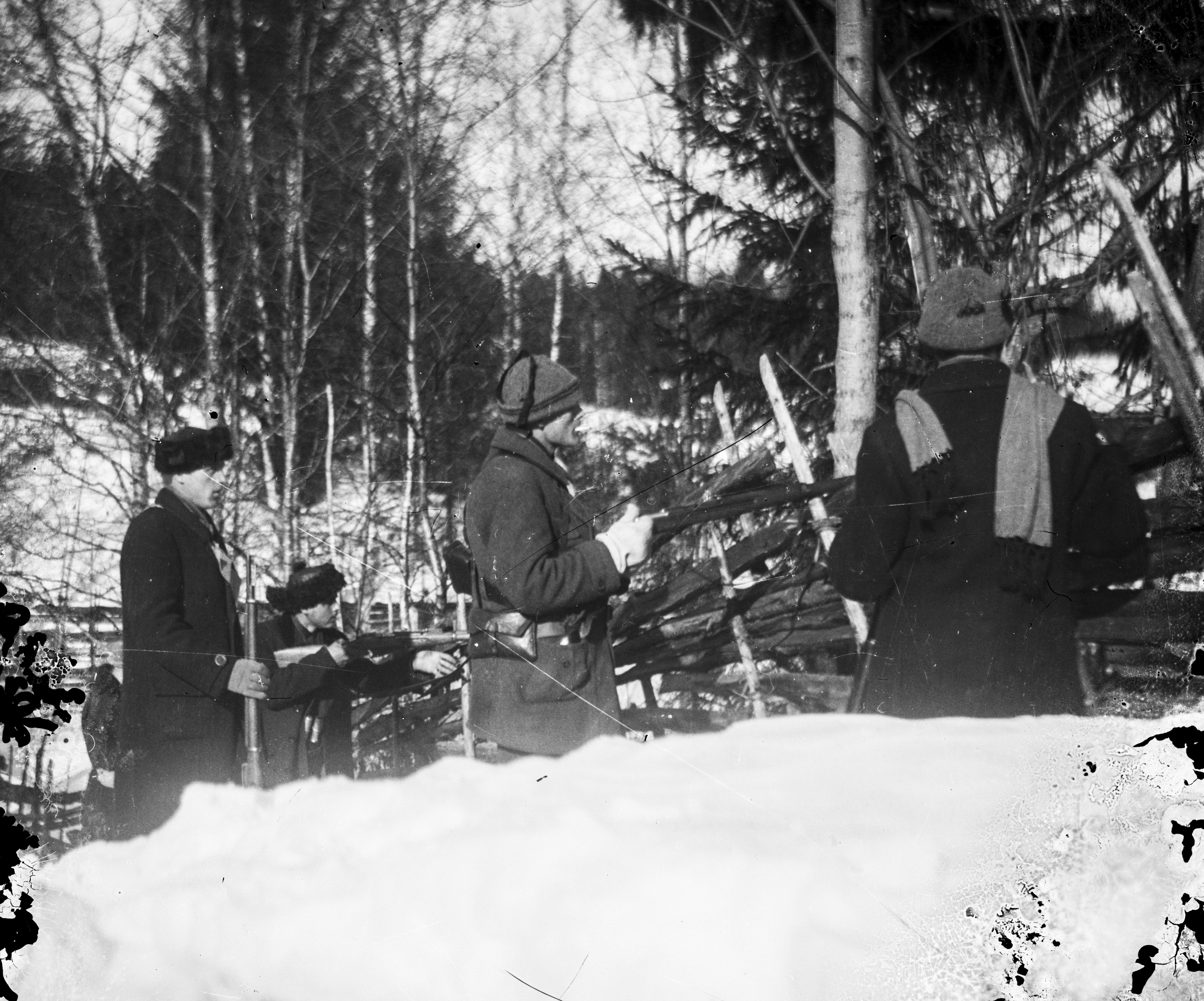
- Red Guard fighters in firing line
Date	5 February – 19 March 1918 (1 month and 2 weeks)
Location	Ruovesi, Finland
Result	White victory

Belligerents
Finnish Whites	Finnish Reds (Russian Soviet Federative Socialist Republic) RSFSR

Commanders and leaders
Martin Wetzer; Paul Wallenius	Emil Koski (executed); Herman Järvinen †; Oskar Johansson

Strength
800–900	300–400 Finnish Reds; 500–600 Red RSFSR soldiers

Casualties and losses
47 killed	61 Reds killed 11+ Red RSFSR soldiers killed

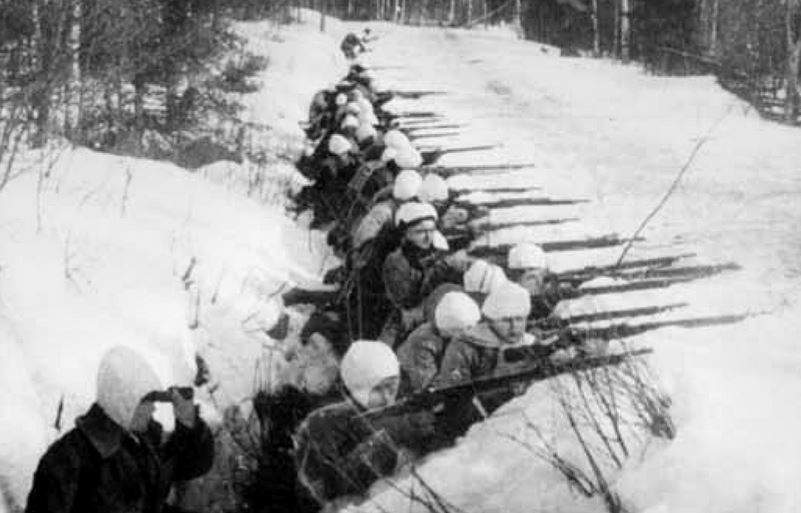
White soldiers in trench

The Battle of Ruovesi was a major battle during the Finnish Civil War and on the Eastern Front of World War I fought in Ruovesi, Finland from 5 February to 19 March 1918 between the Whites and the Reds with support for the latter from Russian volunteers.

The fighting mostly took place in the villages of Pekkala, and Jäminkipohja ja Pihlajalahti in the southern part of the Ruovesi municipality. The Ruovesi village itself, and the northern parts, were held by the Whites. The Reds were aiming from the south to the Tampere–Haapamäki railway, in order to the reach the vital junction of Haapamäki, located 40 kilometres northeast of Ruovesi. Major fighting also occurred in the eastern village of Väärinmaja, but it was connected to the Battle of Vilppula.

The battle is known for the participation of a group of Soviet anarchist sailors, who sided with the Reds on at least one occasion (13 February).

== Background ==
When the war broke out on 27 January, the Whites and the Reds in Ruovesi made an agreement not to take part in the conflict. The situation, however, changed on 2 February as a White Guard unit from the Ostrobothnian municipality of Ylihärmä entered Ruovesi and took over control in the village. The northern parts of Ruovesi, as well as the villages of Jäminkipohja and Ruhala on the southern side of the lake Palovesi, were under White control.

About 200 poorly armed members of the Ruovesi Red Guard withdraw to the southern parts of the municipality, and took control on the southern villages of Murole and Kekkonen. They were soon joined by 100 Red fighters from Tampere. The Reds were commanded by the worker Emil Koski and the carpenter Herman Järvinen. Two days later, the paramilitary White Guards were pulled out from Ruovesi and replaced by a unit of the Western Army, commanded by the Jäger captain Paul Wallenius.

According to the military plan composed by the Red Guard commander-in-chief Ali Aaltonen, focus in the Northern Tavastia region was to secure the vital railway connecting the towns of Tampere and Pori. This meant that the Reds in the rural areas like Ruovesi, Kuru and Virrat were mostly left on their own. The troops in Ruovesi were only supported by a small unit from the Helsinki district of Hermanni, led by Oskar Johansson.

== The battle ==
=== Red offensive ===
The first confrontation in Ruovesi occurred on 5 February, as the Reds crossed the frozen lake Palovesi and reached the road connecting Kuru and Ruovesi. 200 Whites of the Vöyri Military Academy managed to push the Reds back and secure the road. Minor clashes occurred on 12 February. A day later, the Reds launched a major offensive against the Ruovesi village from three directions. They were joined by a group of 500–600 Russian volunteers, commanded by the second lieutenant G. A. Stolbov. The Soviet unit included 250–350 anarchist sailors from the Baltic Fleet battleships Poltava and Respublika, and the destroyer Orfei, that were docked in Turku. The sailors were heading back home by train via Tampere, but had decided to participate in the war on the Tavastia Front on their way to Soviet Russia.

The Soviets assaulted the White positions by the Pekkala Manor, with waving black flags and Jolly Rogers. After several hours of fighting, some of the Whites escaped to the ice of lake Palovesi, and the commander Martin Wetzer gave an order to retreat. However, a unit of White Guard fighters from Lapua, commanded by the prominent warlord Matti Laurila, managed to take the anarchists by surprise as they were crossing an open field. The sailors were not trained in ground warfare, which caused heavy losses in the machine gun fire, and the anarchists were forced to retreat as the darkness fell. At least 11 Soviets were killed and 30 wounded. This was the only battle the anarchists fought in the Finnish Civil War, the sailors returned Russia in two days. The rest of the Soviet volunteers were transferred to the Battle of Kuru, taking place 20 kilometres southwest of Ruovesi. According to some sources, two anarchists stayed at the front for a while trying to raise a guerilla warfare.

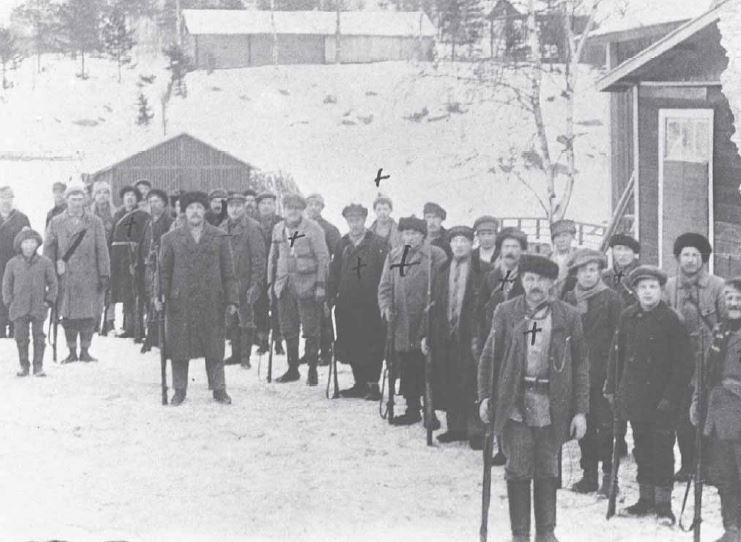
Members of Ruovesi Red Guard in Murole, commander Emil Koski in front

The Reds launched three more offensives on 21 February, 2 March and 10 March, but these attacks failed as well.

=== White offensive ===
On 15 March, the Whites launched their major attack on the Tavastia Front. Most of the Ruovesi Reds retreated to the Murole Canal. A day later, they were joined by the Russian volunteers from Kuru, who were pushed back by the 1,650-men squad of the Swedish colonel lieutenant Harald Hjalmarson. On 18 March, the Red positions were pounded by heavy artillery fire, and they decided to leave Ruovesi. The Reds retreated south, where they soon joined the Battle of Tampere. The Reds were joined by their fleeing family members and other civilians who supported them.

On 19 March, the whole Ruovesi was under White control. A week later, the White Army started a general draft among the men who had stayed in Ruovesi. However, most of them were Red supporters who did not take part on the conscription.

Most of the Ruovesi Reds who participated the Battle of Tampere were captured as the town fell in 4–6 April. They were taken to the Kalevankangas camp where the commander Emil Koski was executed on 5 May. Herman Järvinen, was killed in action on 3 April.

== Terror ==
During the Battle of Ruovesi, the Reds killed 14 civilians who were suspected as White collaborators or spies. The Whites, in turn, killed at least four civilians.
