= Diliberto =

Diliberto is a surname. Notable people with the surname include:

- Bernard "Buddy" Diliberto (1931–2005), American sports commentator
- Danny DiLiberto (1935–2025), American pool player
- David Diliberto (born 1970), American filmmaker
- John Diliberto, American radio host and producer
- Oliviero Diliberto (born 1956), Italian politician
- Silvio Diliberto (born 1963), Dutch football player
