= Kristina Tonteri-Young =

Finnish-American actress and former ballerina (born 1998)

- Born: Kristina Annika Tonteri-Young; 17 January 1998 (age 28); Finland
- Education: The Bolshoi Ballet Academy; Guildhall School of Music and Drama
- Occupations: Actress; ballerina
- Years active: 2010–present
- Known for: Sister Beatrice in Warrior Nun (2020-2022)

Kristina Annika Tonteri-Young (born 17 January 1998) is a Finnish-American actress and former ballerina.

== Early life and career ==
Tonteri-Young was born in Finland to a Finnish mother and Chinese New Zealander father from Hong Kong. Her family moved to New York City when she was 6 years old. From 2009 to 2012, she attended The Bolshoi Ballet Academy in Moscow, where she learned Russian. During her time there, Tonteri-Young appeared in La fille mal gardée at the Bolshoi Theatre and The Sleeping Beauty and Le Corsaire at the Kremlin Ballet. At age 16, she got into acting, attending some Shakespeare summer courses at RADA. She attended Guildhall School of Music and Drama as a Skinners’ Lawrence Atwell Scholar from 2016 to 2019, and graduated with a Bachelor of Arts. There, she appeared in a few stage plays.

Her first on screen role was Netflix's series Warrior Nun, where she starred as Sister Beatrice. She has since appeared in a few films, including Netflix's Outside the Wire.

== Personal life ==
Tonteri-Young is fluent in Finnish, English and French, and also speaks some Russian. Her favorite way to use her free time is by surfing and hiking.

== Acting credits ==
=== Film and television ===
Year	Title	Role	Notes	Ref.
2020 - 2022	Warrior Nun	Sister Beatrice	Main role	
2020	A Gift from Bob	Bea		
2021	Outside the Wire	Corp. Mandy Bale		
2021	Dancing Through the Shadow	Tia Zhang	Main role	
2025	Love Is the Monster	Blake	Supporting role	
2026	The Last Disturbance of Madeline Hynde		Post-production	

=== Theatre ===
Year	Title	Role	Venue	Ref.
2015	The Crocodile's Gift	Damura/Jelita	Everyman Theatre, Cheltenham	
2018	The Last Days of Judas Iscariot	Henrietta Iscariot	Guildhall School of Music and Drama	
2018	Saturday, Sunday, Monday	Attilia	Guildhall School of Music and Drama	

== Ballet ==
Year	Title	Venue	Ref.
2010	La fille mal gardée	Bolshoi Theatre	
2011	The Sleeping Beauty	The Kremlin Ballet	
2011	Le Corsaire	The Kremlin Ballet	
