= Tatu Sinisalo =

Finnish actor (born 1992)

- Born: Tatu Johannes Sinisalo; 17 July 1992 (age 33); Helsinki, Finland
- Occupation: Actor
- Years active: 2010–present

Tatu Johannes Sinisalo (born 17 July 1992) is a Finnish actor. He is known for his first film role as the singer Toni Wirtanen in the 2016 film Born in Heinola. He also played the young Kari Tapio in the 2019 biographical film King of Hearts.

== Filmography ==
- Born in Heinola (Teit meistä kauniin, 2016)
- The Unknown Soldier (Tuntematon sotilas, 2017)
- The Trainer (Valmentaja, 2018)
- King of Hearts (Olen suomalainen, 2019)
- Fingerpori (2019)
- One Half of Me (Aika jonka sain, 2020)
- Northern Quality (Pohjolan satoa, 2022)
- Sisu (2022)
- Love is the Monster (2025)
