= Aatos Erkko =

Finnish newspaper editor and publisher

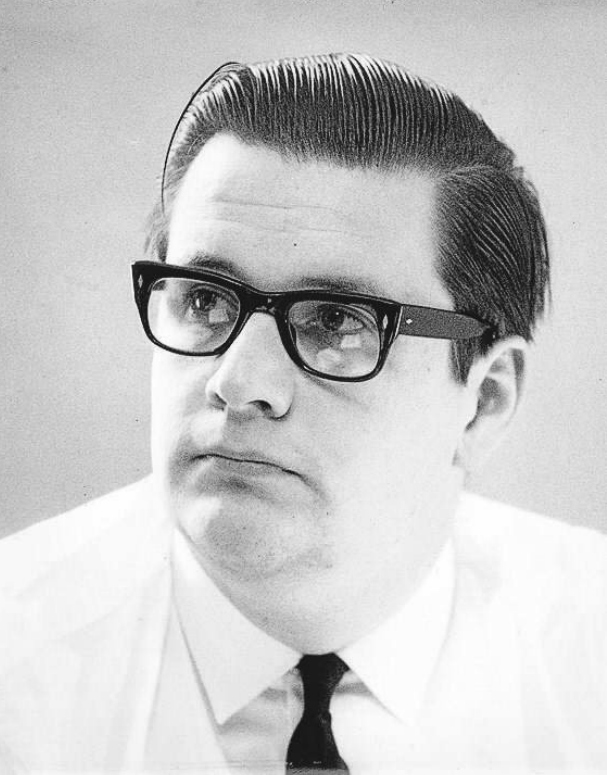
Aatos Erkko in 1963.

Aatos Juho Michel Erkko (16 September 1932 – 5 May 2012) was a Finnish newspaper editor, newspaper publisher, and the main owner of the Sanoma Corporation and the newspaper Helsingin Sanomat, of which he was also the editor in chief.

He was for many years the wealthiest person in Finland and directly or indirectly controlled 23.29% of the Sanoma Corporation's shares, whose value on 29 July 2009 was more than €453 million.

== Family ==
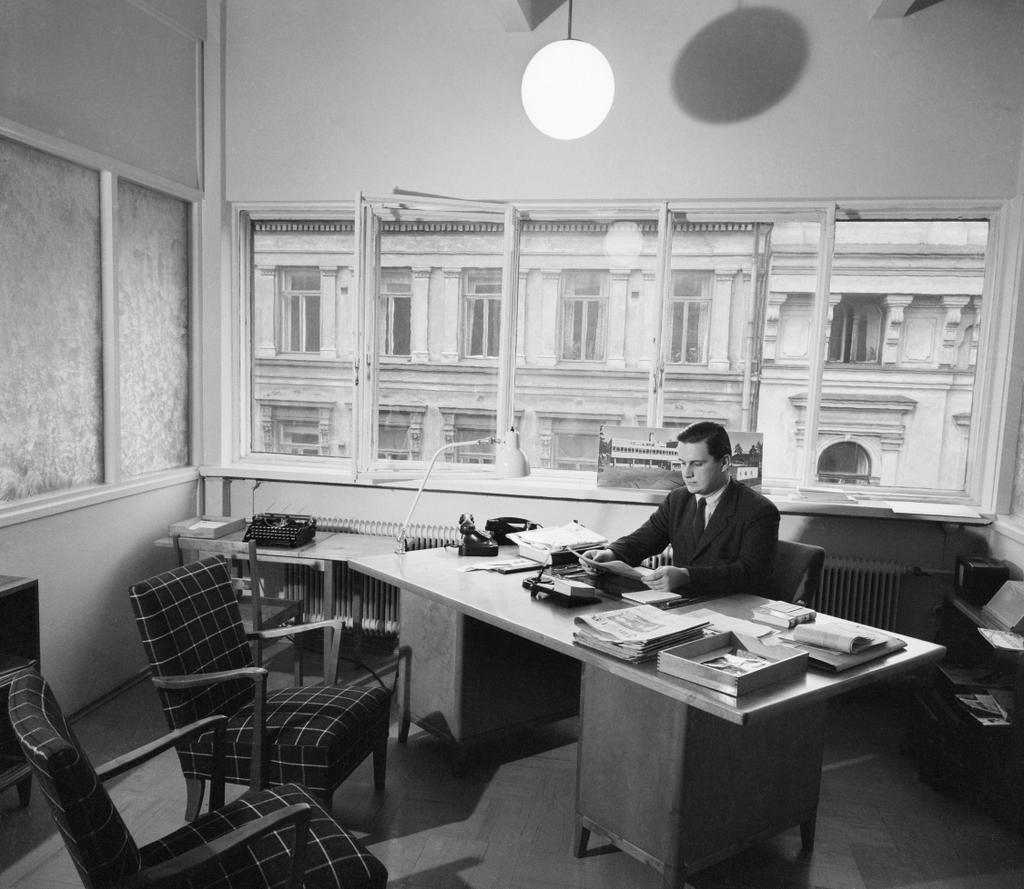
Aatos Erkko in 1953, as editor in chief of the news magazine Viikkosanomat, his first job as a journalist. This magazine was also owned by Sanoma.

Aatos Erkko was born in Helsinki. He married Jane Airola in 1959, but they did not have any children.

His father was the politician and journalist Eljas Erkko, who preceded him as editor in chief of Helsingin Sanomat, and his mother was the English-born Eugenia Violet Sutcliffe. Erkko's father was also the Minister of Foreign Affairs in 1938 and 1939, as the Finns negotiated with the Soviet Union.

Erkko's grandfather Eero Erkko was also a journalist and politician, best remembered as the founder of Helsingin Sanomat.

== Education ==
Erkko earned a Master of Science degree in Journalism from the Columbia College of Columbia University.

== Sanoma ==
Sanoma made its initial public offering in 1999, during Aatos Erkko's time as chairman of the board. Reporting news from around the world became increasingly important. Erkko founded Sanoma's own school for journalists in 1967, and Sanoma has foreign correspondents in many countries.

== Wealth ==
Aatos Erkko was the largest single owner of Finland's largest media concern, holding just over 23% of the Sanoma stock. As one of the key parts of Sanoma, Helsingin Sanomat is the largest newspaper by circulation in the entire Nordic region. The value of his assets was in 2012 estimated as of €600 million. Ca €300 million is in international securities managed by an investment company registered in Switzerland.

== Donations ==
Aatos Erkko once donated €2.9 million to the University of Helsinki for the establishment of a professorship.

He also donated expensive equipment to the Helsinki University Central Hospital and gave significant financial support to the Nuuksio National Park.

The Jane and Aatos Erkko Foundation donated €415,000 for child disease diagnostics in 2011.
