= The Last Disturbance of Madeline Hynde =

Upcoming film by Kenneth Branagh

- Directed by: Kenneth Branagh
- Written by: Kenneth Branagh
- Produced by: Tamar Thomas; Laura Berwick; Becca Kovacik; Matthew Jenkins; Ashley Fox; Johnny Pariseau
- Starring: Jodie Comer; Patricia Arquette; Michael Sheen; Tom Bateman; Vicky McClure; Michael Balogun; Kristina Tonteri-Young; Eadie Johnson
- Cinematography: Nanu Segal
- Music by: Volker Bertelmann
- Production companies: Maximum Effort; TKBC
- Countries: United States; United Kingdom
- Language: English

The Last Disturbance of Madeline Hynde is an upcoming psychological thriller film written and directed by Kenneth Branagh.

== Cast ==
- Jodie Comer
- Patricia Arquette
- Michael Sheen
- Tom Bateman
- Vicky McClure
- Michael Balogun
- Kristina Tonteri-Young
- Eadie Johnson
- Karla Crome
- Aiysha Hart
- Gemma Whelan
- Ian Dunnett Jnr

== Production ==
It was announced in May 2024 that Kenneth Branagh would be writing and directing the film, with Jodie Comer cast to star. In August, Patricia Arquette, Michael Sheen, Tom Bateman, Vicky McClure, Michael Balogun and Kristina Tonteri-Young were added to the cast.

Principal photography began on 6 August 2024, in the United Kingdom.
