= Love Is the Monster =

2025 Canadian horror film

- Film poster
- Directed by: Alex Noyer
- Written by: Alex Noyer; Hannu Aukia; Blair Bathory
- Produced by: Laurence Gendron; Alex Noyer; Hannu Aukia
- Starring: Madeline Zima; Leonardo Nam; Kimberly-Sue Murray; Moe Jeudy-Lamour; Kristina Tonteri-Young; Milla Puolakanaho; Sheila McCarthy
- Cinematography: Russ De Jong
- Edited by: Hannu Aukia
- Music by: Veikki Virkajärvi; Andrew Scott Bell
- Production companies: You Know Films; Genco Pictures
- Release date: October 13, 2025 (Screamfest)
- Running time: 86 minutes
- Countries: United States; Finland; Canada
- Language: English

Love Is the Monster is a 2025 horror thriller film written and directed by Alex Noyer. It tells the story of troubled couples who head to a groundbreaking retreat in Finland, where they fall prey to a malevolent ancient goddess of love. The film stars Madeline Zima, Leonardo Nam, Kristina Tonteri-Young, and Sheila McCarthy.

It premiered at the Screamfest Horror Film Festival on October 13, 2025.

== Plot ==
Ana and Justin, a couple who have been rocked by infidelity, attend an exclusive couples retreat in Finland under the golden rays of the summer's midnight sun. They join other couples from other parts of the world to experience the transformative teachings of the shaman and healer, Tiina, inspired by Lempo, the ancient goddess of love and fertility from Finnish mythology. But the idyllic setting soon takes a turn.

== Cast ==
- Madeline Zima as Ana
- Leonardo Nam as Justin
- Kimberly-Sue Murray as Harper
- Moe Jeudy-Lamour as Lance
- Kristina Tonteri-Young as Blake
- Milla Puolakanaho as Tiina
- Sheila McCarthy as Margaret
- Alexander Eling as Marko
- Tatu Sinisalo as Petri
- Louis Lay as Maxime
- Anne-Julie Proulx as Delphine
- Gloria Slade as Caroline
- Louise Kerr as the widow

== Production ==
The film is shot in Canada, such in the rural wilderness of Ontario.

== Release ==
In August 2023, it was announced that XYZ Films would handle the film's North American rights, and would launch sales at the 2023 Toronto International Film Festival. In May 2025, it was announced that Raven Banner Entertainment would launch global sales for the film at the Marché du Film and its Fantastic Pavilion at the 2025 Cannes Film Festival.

The film's world premiere was held at the Screamfest Horror Film Festival on October 13, 2025.

== See also ==
- Sound of Violence
