= Murole Canal =

Canal in Ruovesi, Finland

Coordinates: 61°51′18″N 023°54′24″E

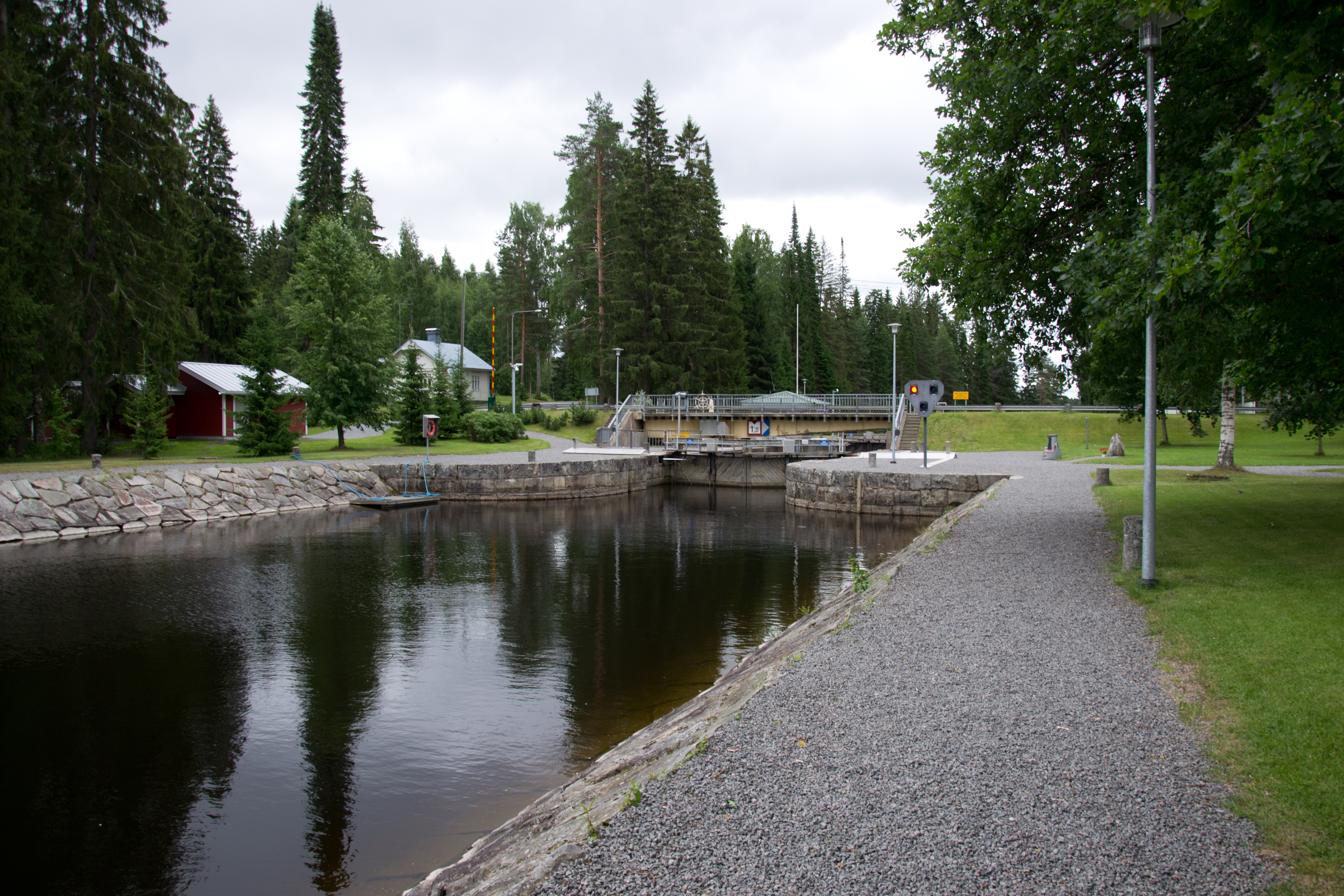
The Murole Canal

The Murole Canal (Finnish: Muroleen kanava) is a transportation canal that connects the lake Palovesi with the lake Vankavesi in Ruovesi, Finland. The canal was built in 1852–1854.

Murole Canal is a part of the route Runoilijan tie (the Poet's Route), named after the Finnish national poet Johan Ludvig Runeberg, running between the city of Tampere and the town of Virrat. The route is sailed in the summertime by the SS Tarjanne.

== Dimensions ==
- Length: 315 m (1,033 ft)
- Total lift: 1.5 m (4 ft 11 in)
- The maximum dimensions allowed for a ship transiting the canal are:
  - Length: 40.0 m (131.2 ft)
  - Beam (width): 7.7 m (25 ft)
  - Draft: 2.4 m (7 ft 10 in)
  - Height of mast: 18.0 m (59.1 ft)
