= Eero Erkko =

Finnish journalist and politician (1860–1927)

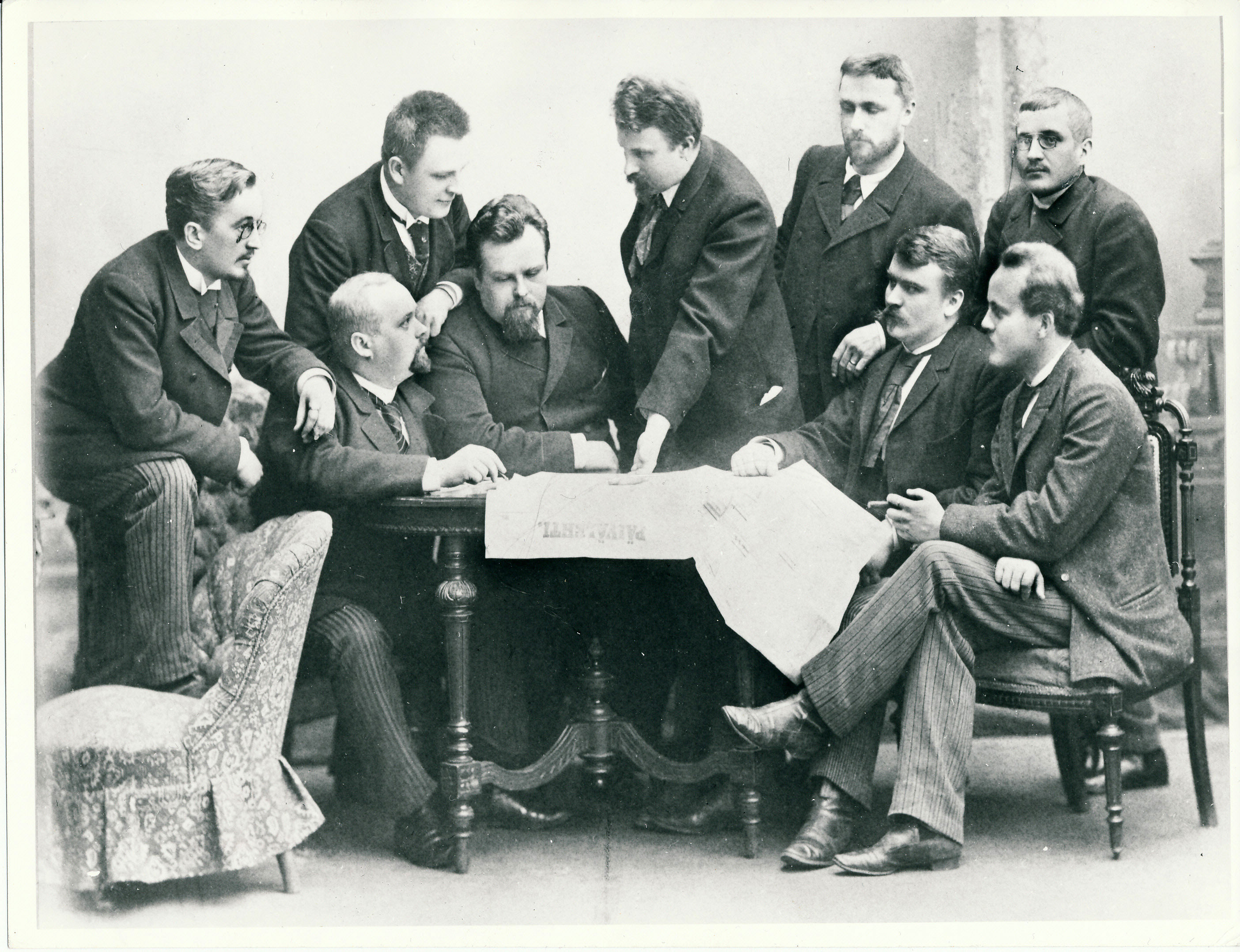
Erkko (seated at the table, second from the right) in 1893

Eero Erkko (18 May 1860, Orimattila – 14 October 1927, Helsinki) was a Finnish journalist and politician. He founded the newspaper Päivälehti in 1889 and later became editor-in-chief of its successor Helsingin Sanomat. A leading figure in the passive resistance to the Russification of Finland, Erkko was exiled in 1903 and spent his exile in the United States. He served in the Diet of Finland from 1894 and in the Parliament of Finland from 1907 to 1919, and held three ministerial posts between 1918 and 1920.

== Background and early career ==
Erkko began his schooling at the elementary school in Viipuri, where his elder brother J.H. Erkko taught and later served as headmaster. He matriculated in 1880 and enrolled at the University of Helsinki, where he first studied mathematics before turning to law. Lacking the means to support his studies, he abandoned them for a career in journalism. From 1885 to 1887, Erkko was editor of the newspaper Keski-Suomi in Jyväskylä.

== Päivälehti and the resistance to Russification ==
Erkko founded Päivälehti in Helsinki in 1889 and served as its first editor-in-chief from 1889 to 1900. The paper was the organ of the Young Finnish Party and during the years of oppression became a target of Governor-General Nikolai Bobrikov; it faced dozens of press-freedom prosecutions and was suspended for three months in 1899. Bobrikov removed Erkko from the editorship in 1900. Erkko then led the underground publishing activities of the Kagal, the secret resistance organisation against Russification. His continued opposition resulted in his being exiled from Finland in 1903, and Päivälehti was permanently closed in the summer of 1904.

== Exile in the United States ==
During his exile Erkko settled in New York City, where he became a rallying figure for Finnish immigrants in the United States. He founded the weekly newspaper Amerikan Kaiku, which addressed issues concerning Finnish emigrants in North America, and ran a print shop and bookshop alongside it. He was a co-founder of the Central Association of Finnish Americans (Amerikansuomalaisten keskusliitto), which maintained ties between the immigrant community and Finland. Erkko returned to Finland with his family in 1905.

== Helsingin Sanomat ==
Helsingin Sanomat, the successor to Päivälehti, began publication in October 1904. Erkko became chairman of the board of the publishing company Sanoma in 1906 and later returned as editor-in-chief of the paper, a position he held — with interruptions during his time in government — for the rest of his life. The paper fell silent shortly after the outbreak of the Finnish Civil War in 1918 and resumed publication on 13 April that year. After returning to the editorial offices in 1920, Erkko modernised the foreign-news desk and introduced other reforms that quickly doubled the paper's circulation. He became the largest shareholder and chairman of the board of the company, and toward the end of his life asked his eldest son Eljas Erkko to take over his post in the editorial office.

== Political career ==
Erkko was among the founders of the Young Finnish Party in 1894 and later belonged to the leadership of its successor, the National Progressive Party. He was elected to the Diet of Finland in the burgher estate in 1894 and to the first unicameral Parliament of Finland in 1906, serving as a member until 1919. For most of the period from 1906 he also led the Young Finnish Party, representing its left wing in the bitter internal struggle between the "swallows" and the "sparrows" that began in 1908.

During the Finnish Civil War Erkko spent most of the conflict imprisoned on Katajanokka in Helsinki together with Santeri Ivalo. After the war his expertise was drawn upon by parliament's constitutional committee, and as an ally of K. J. Ståhlberg he campaigned vigorously for a republican form of government against the monarchists. He served as minister of social affairs from 27 November 1918 to 17 April 1919, minister of transport and public works from 17 April to 15 August 1919, and Minister of Trade and Industry from 15 August 1919 to 15 March 1920.

== Family ==
In 1894 Erkko married Maria Aurora ("Maissi") Holländer of Turku, who was twelve years his junior. He was the brother of the poet J.H. Erkko, the father of Eljas Erkko and the grandfather of Aatos Erkko.

He is buried in Hietaniemi Cemetery in Helsinki.
