= Ian Dunnett Jnr =

Scottish actor

Ian Dunnett Jnr is a Scottish actor.

Dunnett Jnr was a resident of Kinnesswood, and had attended Kinross High School. He would perform acting and music at the Edinburgh Festival Fringe. He attended the Royal Conservatoire of Scotland from 2013 to 2017, earning his Bachelor of Music with Honors for piano, and studied acting at the Royal Academy of Dramatic Art.

Dunnett Jnr works extensively on various audio dramas with BBC Radio, having been granted the Carleton Hobbs Bursary in 2020. He would have roles in the films Belfast, Lee and My Mother's Wedding, as well as a role in the Apple TV+ miniseries Masters of the Air.

== Filmography ==
=== Film ===
Year	Title	Role	Notes
2021	Belfast	Uncle Tony	
2023	My Mother's Wedding	Fireman	
2023	Lee	Raymond Hollman	
TBA	The Last Disturbance of Madeline Hynde †		Post-production

=== Television ===
Year	Title	Role	Notes
2023	Shetland	Liam Kenmuir	4 episodes
2024	Masters of the Air	Lt. Ron Bailey	Miniseries, 4 episodes

=== Radio ===
Date	Title	Role	Director	Station
2024	The Archers	Mr. Murray	Peter Leslie Wild	BBC Radio 4
