= My Mother's Wedding =

2023 film by Kristin Scott Thomas

- Theatrical release poster
- Directed by: Kristin Scott Thomas
- Written by: Kristin Scott Thomas; John Micklethwait
- Produced by: Finola Dwyer; Steven Rales
- Starring: Scarlett Johansson; Sienna Miller; Emily Beecham; Freida Pinto; Thibault de Montalembert; Kristin Scott Thomas
- Cinematography: Yves Bélanger
- Edited by: Joan Sobel
- Music by: Rolfe Kent
- Production companies: Indian Paintbrush; Finola Dwyer Productions; Ridlington Road Productions
- Distributed by: Vertical (United States); Universal Pictures (United Kingdom)
- Release dates: 7 September 2023 (TIFF); 8 August 2025 (United States); 29 May 2026 (United Kingdom)
- Running time: 96 minutes
- Countries: United Kingdom; United States
- Language: English
- Box office: $1.3 million

My Mother's Wedding (formerly titled North Star) is a 2023 comedy-drama film directed by Kristin Scott Thomas in her directorial debut, from a screenplay she co-wrote with her husband John Micklethwait. It stars Scott Thomas alongside Scarlett Johansson, Sienna Miller, Emily Beecham, Freida Pinto and Thibault de Montalembert. The plot follows three sisters who return to their family home to attend the third wedding of their twice-widowed mother, each dealing with their own personal problems.

The film premiered at the Toronto International Film Festival on 7 September 2023. It was released in the United States on 8 August 2025 by Vertical and in the United Kingdom on 29 May 2026 by Universal Pictures.

== Plot ==
Sisters Katherine, Victoria and Georgina return to their family home in the English countryside to attend the wedding of their twice-widowed mother Diana, who is marrying her third husband, Geoff Loveglove. Diana's first two husbands were both Royal Navy pilots; after Katherine and Victoria's father, John Frost, died in a plane crash during the Falklands War, Diana married his best friend, Jonathan Munson, who went missing in action in Bosnia and was presumed dead.

Katherine, the eldest daughter, is a captain in the Royal Navy who has been recently appointed the first woman to command a British aircraft carrier. Katherine still struggles with memories of her father and is often away at sea, leaving her son Marcus in the care of her longtime girlfriend, Jack. Middle daughter Victoria, a famous Hollywood actress, is unable to maintain a long-term relationship. Georgina, the half-sister and the youngest daughter, is a palliative nurse and, at Victoria's suggestion, has hired a private detective to investigate her husband Jeremy, whom she suspects is having an affair.

At the wedding reception, Victoria's wealthy and much older French lover, Jerome (whom she nicknames the "Grand Fromage"), arrives in a helicopter, although she had told him not to come. Victoria also reconnects with childhood sweetheart Charlie. After the reception, the three sisters watch video footage obtained by the private detective, which shows Jeremy having sex with another woman in their house; Georgina is disgusted and furious.

Katherine tells her sisters that when she was 12, Jonathan asked if she wanted to change her last name to Munson, as he wanted to adopt her and Victoria, but Katherine wanted to retain her birth father's last name. Victoria feels betrayed, saying she would have happily taken Jonathan's last name. As they argue, Victoria confronts Katherine over kissing another woman while in Africa, and Katherine blurts out that Victoria had a one-night stand with Jeremy before he met Georgina. Georgina accuses Victoria of having a vested interest in appointing a detective to prove Jeremy's infidelity.

Back at Diana's house, Jack informs Katherine that she has become pregnant through in vitro fertilisation, as she wanted a child of her own and wishes that Katherine will marry her so they can raise a family. Katherine is upset that Jack made this decision without discussing it with her, but Jack argues that Katherine goes away for months and that she had written about it in a letter sent to Katherine, who never answered. Katherine tells Jack she refuses to give up her career to co-parent a child she never asked for.

At dawn, Geoff calls the fire brigade after Victoria's 14-year-old son Skylar climbs a tree. Victoria is humiliated when one of the firefighters films her with his phone and lashes out at Geoff, declaring that he will never understand children because he has never been a father. Enraged, Diana slaps Victoria. The next morning at John's and Jonathan's graves, Diana tells the sisters that their fathers were not the perfect men they imagined. She admits that when Jonathan asked her to change her daughters' last names, she sent him to Katherine knowing she would not agree to it. She also urges her daughters to let go of the past and reaffirms that Geoff makes her happy.

Victoria apologises to Geoff and decides to give Charlie a chance. Back in London, Georgina finds the courage to divorce Jeremy and throw him out of the house. The family attends Katherine's promotion ceremony on board HMS Prince of Wales. After the ceremony, Katherine reconciles with Jack, saying she is ready to welcome Jack's baby into their family.

== Cast ==
- Scarlett Johansson as Katherine
- Sienna Miller as Victoria
- Emily Beecham as Georgina
- Freida Pinto as Jack
- James Fleet as Geoff
- Mark Stanley as Charlie
- Sindhu Vee as Belkis
- Samson Kayo as Steve
- Joshua McGuire as Jeremy
- Thibault de Montalembert as the Grand Fromage
- Kristin Scott Thomas as Diana
- Roger Ashton-Griffiths as Ken
- Ian Dunnett Jnr as fireman

Giulio Berruti makes an uncredited appearance.

== Production ==
In June 2022, it was revealed that Scarlett Johansson and Kristin Scott Thomas were working together on a new film that was set to be the latter's first directing role. That same month, Sienna Miller, Freida Pinto and Emily Beecham were added to the cast. The semi-autobiographical film is based on Scott Thomas's own life growing up in a single-parent household without a father; her birth father and stepfather were both Royal Navy pilots who died in plane crashes when she was 5 and 11 years old, respectively. Filming of a wedding took place on location in Hampshire at St Mary's Church, Ashley, and on parts of The Grange Hampshire estate near Northington in June 2022, while Johansson was reported to be filming naval scenes on HMS Prince of Wales in Portsmouth.

Principal photography was reported as being completed by the end of July 2022, with Scott Thomas being quoted as saying she found the experience "exhilarating" and that it was "thrilling to create this fictional family using my own childhood memories as a springboard." The film marks the third time that Scott Thomas and Johansson have played mother and daughter respectively, following The Horse Whisperer (1998) and The Other Boleyn Girl (2008).

In July 2023, the film was renamed to North Star ahead of its world premiere. In February 2025, the film was then renamed back to its original title after Vertical acquired North American distribution rights.

== Release ==
My Mother's Wedding had its world premiere at the Toronto International Film Festival on 7 September 2023. The film was released in the United States on 8 August 2025 by Vertical and in the United Kingdom on 29 May 2026 by Universal Pictures.

== Reception ==
=== Box office ===
My Mother's Wedding has grossed $1.3 million at the box office.

=== Critical response ===
On the review aggregator website Rotten Tomatoes, 41% of 61 critics' reviews are positive, with an average rating of 5.2/10. The website's consensus reads: "My Mother's Wedding boasts appealing scenery and a wide array of talent, but fatal miscasting and a bloated story keep Kristin Scott Thomas' directorial debut from being a blessed event." Metacritic, which uses a weighted average, assigned the film a score of 51 out of 100, based on 12 critics, indicating "mixed or average" reviews.

Lindsey Bahr of the Associated Press wrote that the film "has a silly lightness to it that's aiming for something along the lines of a Richard Curtis romantic comedy. But coherency of the vision is limited, as is the audience's investment, though there are some lovely and inspired touches like using Iranian artist Reza Riahi to hand paint several animated flashback vignettes based on her memories of her fathers."

Nell Minow of RogerEbert.com gave the film two and a half out of four stars and wrote, "Rom-com fans may be amused to see Fleet and Scott Thomas together again after playing the wealthy siblings in Four Weddings and a Funeral." She also wrote, "The film was originally titled North Star. Yet, despite a few moments of connection and insight, that is precisely what this story is missing."
