= Kinross High School =

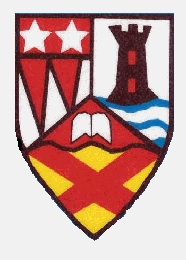
- The Kinross High School badge

Location
- Loch Leven Community Campus; Kinross, Kinross-shire, KY13 8FQ; Scotland; 56°12′36″N 3°25′29″W

Information
- Type: Secondary, state funded
- Motto: Learning the Key
- Local authority: Perth and Kinross
- Head Teacher: Jillian Shaw
- Staff: ~100
- Gender: Coeducational
- Age: ~11 to ~18
- Enrolment: ~1000
- Houses: Ochil; Benarty; Lomond; Moncreiffe
- Colour
- Website: kinrosshighschool.org.uk

Kinross High School is a state school in Kinross, Scotland.

The school is located adjacent to the leisure centre, and is part of Loch Leven Community Campus, named after the nearby Loch Leven. In 2007, it was announced that the school would be moving to a new campus, as part of a scheme of school building in the Perth & Kinross area. The move was completed in 2010. The school has about 1012 pupils enrolled and about 100 members of staff. It is now a Community Campus with public facilities including a climbing wall, a gym, a library and several meeting rooms. Since 2015, Sarah Brown has been the headteacher of Kinross High School, However on 18 March 2025, it was announced that she would take an 18-month secondment to become the senior advisor to the Scottish Qualifications Authority, with her replacement announced on 19 May 2025 as Jillian Shaw, who will enter the role on 16 June 2025.

== Roll ==
- 2010/2011 – 915 pupils
- 2011/2012 – 895 pupils
- 2012/2013 – 906 pupils

== Catchment area ==
The school serves most of the local communities around Kinross shire. Schools that are in the catchment area are:

- Kinross Primary School
- Milnathort Primary School
- Portmoak Primary School
- Fossoway Primary School
- Cleish Primary School
- Arngask Primary School (as of 2013)

== Facilities ==
The High School is located in Loch Leven Community Campus which helps try to bring the community together. As a result, many of the services that used to be offered in Kinross have now been moved into the campus. The library is now located near the main entrance. This allows the public to borrow books but also allows pupils to borrow books for their classes. It also provides an area for the pupils to study on their study periods and other classes to use the IT facilities. There are also various meeting rooms throughout the campus which are available to hire. There is also a new climbing wall used for extra curricular clubs after school. There are now three main PE halls and a gym. The three halls include a large games hall, a smaller games hall and a dance studio. Each hall has the facility to play music through the speakers and the games hall has a large scoreboard if rival teams are playing against each other.

There are also new outdoor pitches. The multi-use games area (MUGA) is used to play sports like basketball, tennis and hockey. There is also a football pitch and a larger pitch used for games, running and rugby.

== Notable alumni ==
- Eilidh Doyle, athlete
- Ian Dunnett Jnr, actor
- Laura Muir, runner
