= Martin Wetzer =

Finnish military personnel and lawyer

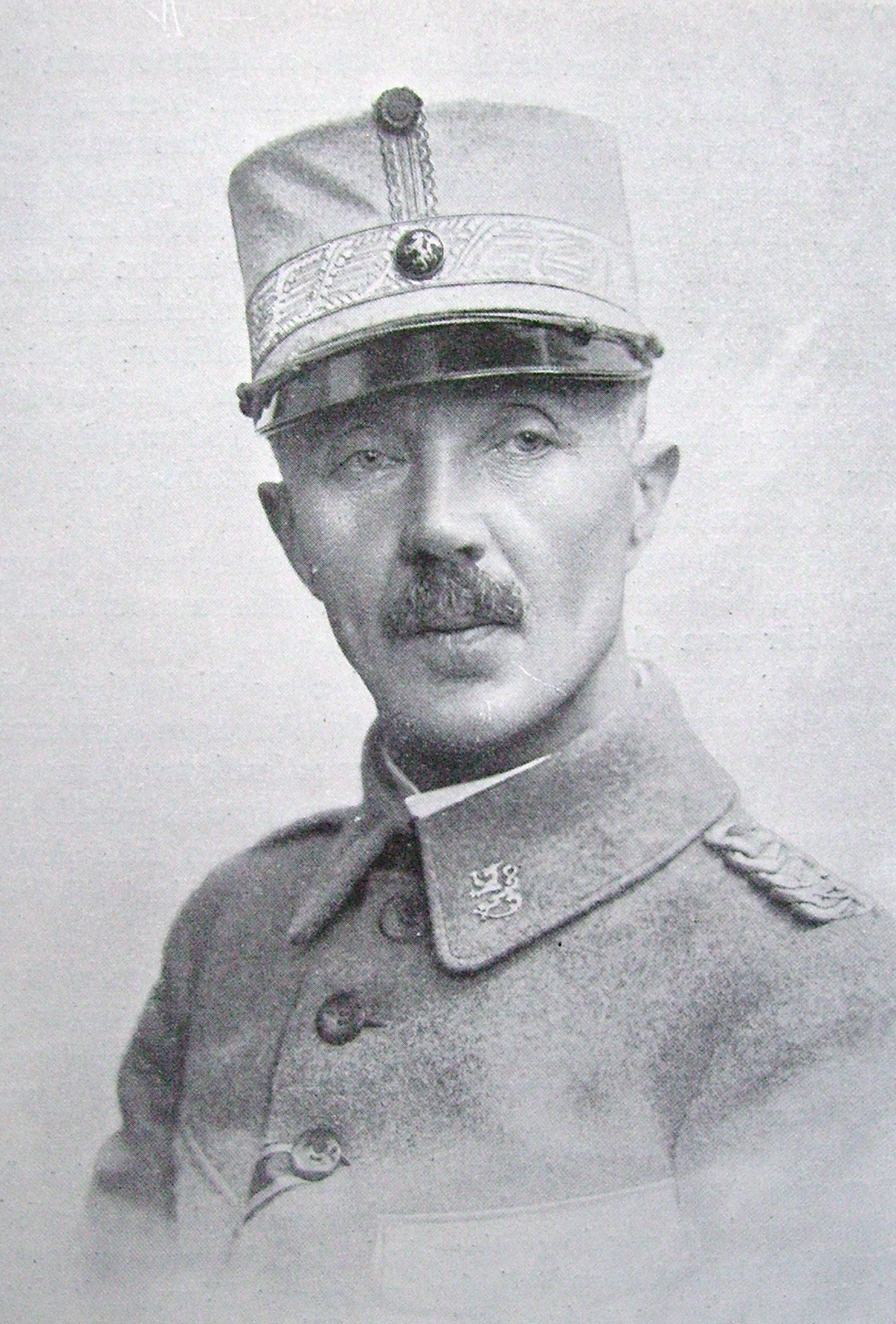
- Born: 7 August 1868; Pfronten, Bavaria
- Died: 10 August 1954 (aged 86); Helsinki, Finland
- Relatives: Konni Wetzer (brother)
- Military career
- Allegiance: Russian Empire (1899–1917); Finland (1918–1925)
- Branch: Imperial Russian Army; White Guard; Finnish Army
- Service years: 1889–1906, 1914–1925
- Rank: General of the Infantry
- Commands: Western Army; 3rd Division; 2nd Division
- Conflicts: World War I; Finnish Civil War; Battle of Ruovesi; Battle of Tampere; Estonian War of Independence
- Other work: Jurist; notary and legal adviser at the Helsinki Court of Appeal (1926–1938)

Martin Wetzer (7 August 1868 – 10 August 1954) was a Finnish jurist and general. A close friend of commander-in-chief Carl Gustaf Emil Mannerheim, he served as the first chief of staff of the White Army at the outbreak of the Finnish Civil War in 1918, and subsequently commanded the forces that captured Tampere and led the Western Army in the final weeks of the war. He also commanded Finnish volunteers in the Estonian War of Independence. After his military career he served as a jurist, and retired with the rank of lieutenant general, being promoted to general of the infantry in 1928.

== Biography ==
=== Early life ===
Wetzer was born on 7 August 1868 in Pfronten in the Kingdom of Bavaria, the son of Martin Wetzer (1816–1882), a Bavarian engineer employed by the Bavarian pilotage authority, and Amalie Schramm (1828–1914). In the Grand Duchy of Finland, then a part of the Russian Empire, he attended Hamina Cadet School from 1882 to 1889.

Wetzer had a brother, Konni Wetzer (1871–1940), who became a noted theater director. In 1897 he married Ingrid Marie Silfverhjelm.

=== Early career ===
Upon graduation in 1889, Wetzer was commissioned as an ensign. He served as an officer in the Finnish Guards' Rifle Battalion from 1889 to 1906 and was promoted to lieutenant in 1893, to staff captain in 1897 and to captain in 1901. He also graduated from the University of Helsinki as a gymnastics teacher in 1898. The Finnish Guard was ordered disbanded in 1905, beginning a lengthy process which lasted into 1906, and after he finally mustered out of it in 1906 he received a post-service termination salary for his time in the battalion.

After leaving the battalion, Wetzer began to study law at the University of Helsinki, from which he graduated with a Bachelor of Laws in 1910. He became a lawyer, a position he held until 1914, and was a partner in the law firm Wetzer & Wahlberg in Vyborg from 1910 to 1917. He became a deputy judge in 1913.

=== World War I ===
When World War I broke out in 1914, Wetzer returned to active military service in the Imperial Russian Army. He was promoted to lieutenant colonel at the beginning of the war and served as a battalion commander in Galicia, the Carpathian Mountains, Lithuania, and Byelorussia during the first two years of the war. He was promoted to colonel in 1915 and commanded an infantry division in Bukovina from 1916 to 1917. After the Russian Revolution began in 1917, Wetzer resigned from the army and returned to Finland.

=== Finnish Civil War ===
In Finland, Wetzer joined the Military Committee, which sought the Independence of Finland. Immediately at the beginning of the Finnish Civil War in late January 1918, Wetzer became an important figure in the organization of the White Army of Finland, as he was a close friend of General Carl Gustaf Emil Mannerheim, who had been appointed commander-in-chief. When forming his staff in January 1918, Mannerheim appointed Wetzer as the first chief of staff. On 27 January 1918, the first day of the war, Wetzer was also allowed to lead the disarmament of the Russians in the central city of Vaasa, which had the largest Russian Army garrison in South Ostrobothnia. As early as 5 February 1918, Wetzer was transferred to the Häme Group as commander and he took over the central Vilppula front, where the Red Guards repeatedly attacked to take over the strategically important railway crossing at Haapamäki. The Häme Group repulsed the Reds' attacks in Vilppula, but was unable to begin progress towards Tampere as planned until the Jämsä Group, commanded by Colonel Karl Wilkman, struck the Reds in Orivesi and forced them to retreat. However, the Häme Group, commanded by Wetzer, played a key role in the conquest of Tampere at the beginning of April At the decisive stage, at the turn of March–April 1918, all troops attacking the center of Tampere from the east and south were under Wetzer's command. He was promoted to major general after the conquest of Tampere. When the White War leadership was reorganized, on 7 April 1918, Wetzer became the commander of the Western Army, and he was responsible for the battles along the Lempäälä–Tuulos–Lammi–Hämeenlinna in the last weeks of the war. The war ended in a White victory on 15 May 1918, and he resigned from permanent military service in June 1918.

=== Estonian War of Independence ===
In January 1919, Wetzer joined the Estonian Army as a volunteer and served as the commander of all Finnish volunteer forces in Estonia for three months. He then came into severe conflict with Estonian Colonel Hans Kalm, who commanded the Northern Sons Regiment. Estonians did not trust Wetzer because he was seen as a defender of the Baltic German nobility and the interests of the Russian White movement, which sought support from Estonia for Mannerheim's plan for an attack on Petrograd as part of the Russian Civil War. By taking advantage of the anti-German sentiment of the Estonians, Kalm brought about the de facto expulsion of Wetzer, described publicly as a trip to the homeland because of health issues.

=== Later life ===
After returning to Finland, Wetzer served as the commander of the Finnish Army's 3rd Division from 1919 to 1920. Occasionally he was employed by the law firm of Antell & Söderhjelm for a year at a time, before serving as commander of the 2nd Division from 1921 to 1925. He was also the chairman of the Finnish delegation to ceasefire negotiations between Finland and Soviet Russia in 1920 and a member of the Hornborg Committee defense audit of 1923 to 1926. As demands for the resignation of old tsarist officers increased in the mid-1920s, Wetzer resigned from the military in 1925 and received upon his resignation a promotion to the rank of lieutenant general. He was noted as the tsarist officer who had maintained the best working relationship with the jäger officers in the Finnish Army. In retirement, he was promoted to the rank of general of the infantry in 1928.

After his military career, Wetzer worked in the Helsinki Court of Appeal as a notary in 1926 and as a legal adviser from 1927 to 1938. After retiring from government service, he worked for the Industrial Mutual Fire Insurance Company from 1938 to 1945. During the Winter War of 1939–1940 and the Continuation War of 1941–1944, Wetzer held a special position as "commander-in-chief," which mainly involved the distribution of medals to wounded soldiers in military hospitals. He died in Helsinki on 29 September 1954.
