= 808 (film) =

2015 American documentary film

- Theatrical poster
- Directed by: Alexander Dunn
- Screenplay by: Luke Bainbridge; Alexander Dunn
- Produced by: Alex Noyer; Alexander Dunn; Craig Kallman; Arthur Baker
- Narrated by: Zane Lowe
- Cinematography: Stuart Birchall; Claudio Rietti
- Edited by: Alexander Dunn; Matthew Jarman; Stuart Birchall
- Production companies: You Know Films; You Know Ltd.; Atlantic Films
- Distributed by: Atlantic Films; Apple Music
- Release dates: March 13, 2015 (SXSW); December 9, 2016 (Apple Music)
- Running time: 107 minutes
- Country: United States
- Language: English

808 is a 2015 American documentary film directed by Alexander Dunn, written by Dunn and Luke Bainbridge, and produced by Alex Noyer, Dunn, Craig Kallman and Arthur Baker. It is narrated by Zane Lowe and documents the history and culture of the Roland TR-808, a drum machine that had a significant effect on hip hop and pop music.

808 premiered at South by Southwest (SXSW) on March 13, 2015. It was released on Apple Music exclusively on December 9, 2016, and was released for iTunes on December 16 by Atlantic Films.

== Cast ==
The film features appearances from Afrika Bambaataa, A Guy Called Gerald, Armand Van Helden, Arthur Baker, A-Trak, Beastie Boys, Bernard Sumner, Chris Barbosa, Chris Frantz, Damon Albarn, David and Stephen Dewaele, David Guetta, David Noller, Diplo, DJ Mr. Mixx, Fatboy Slim, Felix da Housecat, François Kevorkian, Goldie, Graham Massey, Hank Shocklee, Ian Lewis, Ikutaro Kakehashi, John Benitez, Jim Jonsin, Jimmy Jam, Jori Hulkkonen, Lady Tigra, Lil Jon, Man Parrish, Mike Butcher, Mr. Biggs, Papa Wheelie, Pharrell Williams, Phil Collins, Pretty Tony, Questlove, Remi Kabaka, Richie Hawtin, Rick Rubin, Stephen Morris, Strafe, T La Rock, Terry Lewis, The G.L.O.B.E., Tiga, Todd Terry, Tom Silverman and Tony Carrasco.

== Production ==
According to an interview by Billboard, Alex Noyer noted that the film started production with Noyer, director Alexander Dunn and Arthur Baker heading to Winter Music Conference in March 2012. The idea for the film came to Noyer after a nostalgic discussion about 808 classics with Arthur Baker in late 2011 in London. In October 2014, Alex Noyer's You Know Films, Atlantic Films and record producer and DJ Arthur Baker announced the film, as well as its soundtrack and remix album to be released as well by Big Beat/Atlantic Records. On November 15, 2016, You Know Films and Atlantic Films, a division of Atlantic Records, announced the film's release through Apple Music as well as the release of a new trailer.

== Music ==
The soundtrack for the film, 808: The Music, was released on November 25, 2016. It was promoted with a single, "Nothing but Trouble", on June 30, 2015.

== Release ==
The film premiered at South by Southwest on March 13, 2015. It was released on Apple Music exclusively on December 9, 2016, where pre-orders for the film started the same day. The film started a limited release on the same day at the Arena Cinema in Los Angeles. It was released for iTunes on December 16, 2016.

== Reception ==
On the review aggregator website Rotten Tomatoes, 100% of 10 critics' reviews are positive, with an average rating of 7/10.
