= Eljas Erkko =

Finnish politician and journalist

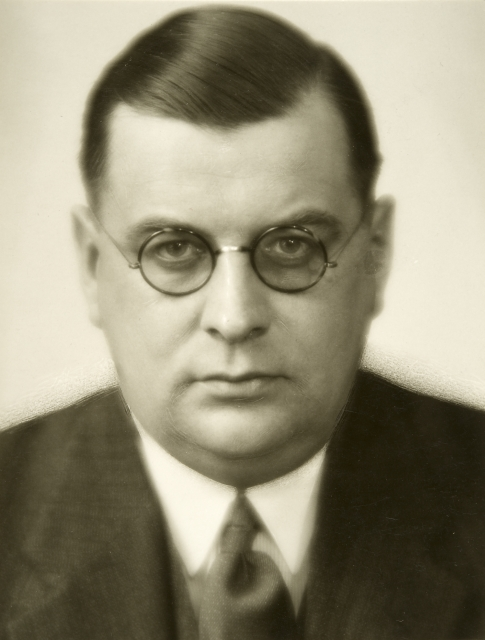

Minister of Foreign Affairs
- In office 12 December 1938 – 1 December 1939
- Prime Minister: Aimo Cajander
- Preceded by: Rudolf Holsti
- Succeeded by: Väinö Tanner

Deputy Minister of the Interior
- In office 25 November 1932 – 14 December 1932

Minister without portfolio
- In office 20 October 1932 – 25 November 1932

Personal details
- Born: Juho Eljas Erkko; 1 June 1895 Helsinki, Finland
- Died: 20 February 1965 (aged 69) Helsinki, Finland
- Party: National Progressive
- Spouse: Eugenia Violet Sutcliffe (1922–)
- Children: Patricia Erkko Seppälä b. 1924 Aatos Erkko
- Occupation: Politician, Journalist, CEO
- Profession: Master of Laws

Juho Eljas Erkko (1 June 1895 in Helsinki – 20 February 1965 in Helsinki) was a Finnish politician and journalist. He was the foreign minister and negotiated with the Soviet Union before the Winter War started. Erkko's father, too, was a politician and journalist, Eero Erkko; his son was a journalist, Aatos Erkko.

Eljas Erkko graduated as Abitur in 1914, Vimpeli School of War in 1918 and Master of Laws in 1922. In 1918, he fought for the White Guards in the Finnish Civil War, the Battle of Ruovesi. He was elected as a Member of Parliament on 1 September 1933 from the Uusimaa constituency. Erkko was a President's elector chosen by voters in the presidential elections held in 1931, 1937, 1940, and 1943.

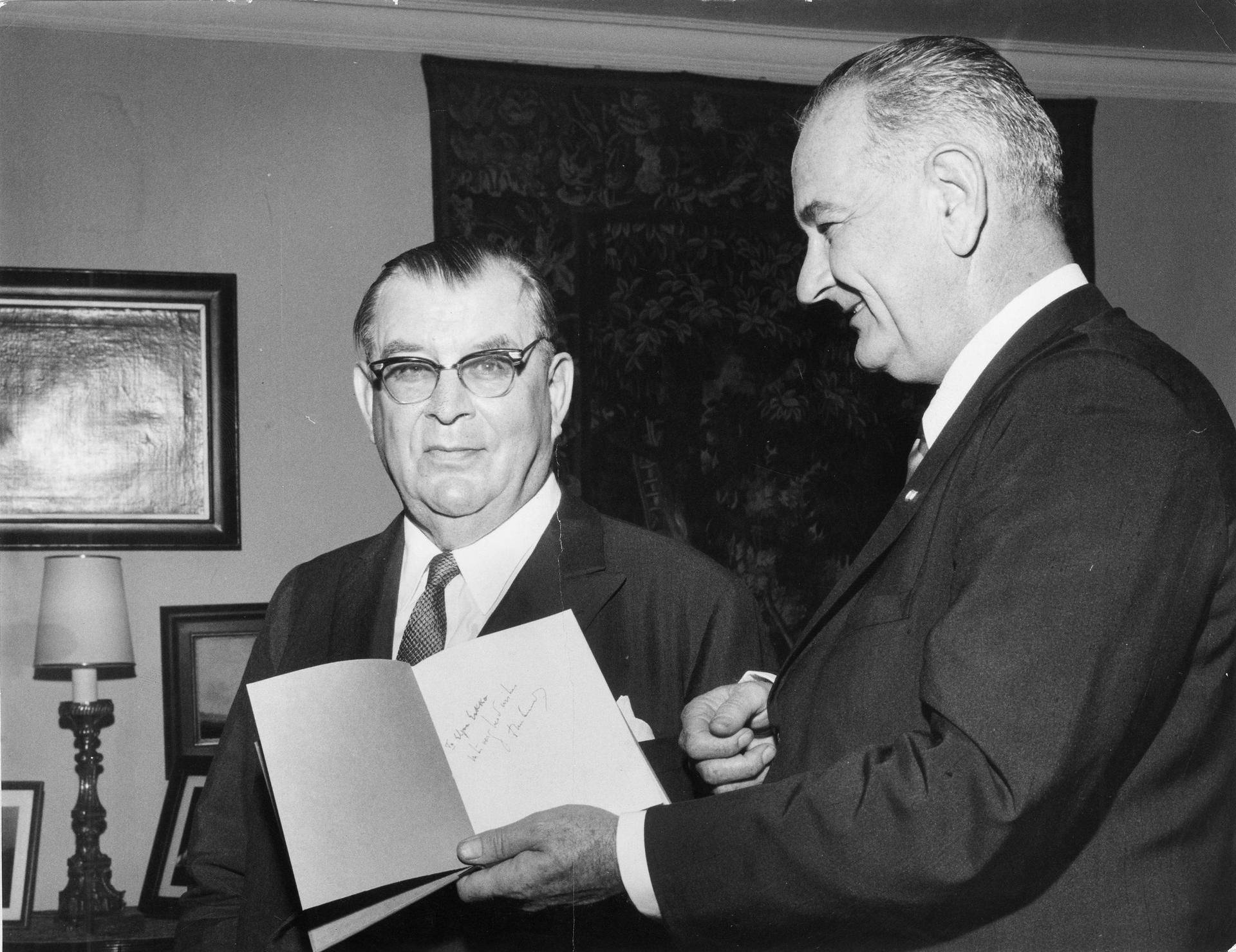
Erkko and Lyndon B. Johnson on September 7, 1963

Erkko was the Minister of Foreign Affairs in 1938 and 1939, as the Finns negotiated with the Soviet Union. The Soviets demanded the exchange of areas with Finland. Erkko did not want to make any concessions. As the Winter War started, Väinö Tanner was assigned a new government and decided to appoint himself as the foreign minister. In 1939 and 1940, he was a chargé d'affaires in Stockholm.

At the beginning of the Continuation War, Erkko was the head of the POW office in Finland until 1942. After the war, Erkko was charged in a court-martial in 1946, but the charges were dropped.

Later years, Erkko worked as CEO and Chairman of the Board of Directors of Sanoma. He was also the Chairman of the Board of Directors in several Finnish companies, including Rautakirja and Suomen Tietotoimisto, and the head of the supervisory board in Kansallis-Osake-Pankki. Erkko was also the head of the government in the Finnish American Association.

Political offices
Preceded by Väinö Voionmaa	Foreign Minister of Finland; 1938–1939	Succeeded by Väinö Tanner
