= Jasmin Savoy Brown =

American actress (born 1994)

- Brown in 2026
- Born: March 21, 1994 (age 32); Alameda, California, U.S.
- Occupation: Actress
- Years active: 2013–present

Jasmin Savoy Brown (born March 21, 1994) is an American actress. She (Note: Brown uses the pronouns she/her and they/them. This article uses both "she" and "they" to respect that.) is known for starring in the thriller drama series Yellowjackets (2021–present) and the slasher franchise Scream (2022–present).

Brown appears in the supernatural series The Leftovers (2015–2017) and the legal drama series For the People (2018–2019), the slasher film Sound of Violence (2021), and the thriller film Missing (2023). They also play Phin Mason / Tinkerer in the video game Spider-Man: Miles Morales (2020).

== Early life ==
Brown was born in Alameda, California to an African-American father and white mother. She has Irish ancestry from the maternal side of her family. They were raised in Springfield, Oregon. At age four, Brown had her first role in a church musical which sparked her love of performing. Growing up, they participated in numerous musicals and were a member of various musical clubs, choirs and groups, some of which include University of Oregon, Portland Shakespeare Project, Art's Umbrella, Oregon Children's Choir, and Upstart Crow Youth Theatre (formerly known as Upstart Crow Studios). Following high school, Brown moved to Portland, Oregon to pursue acting.

== Career ==
Brown began with minor roles in NBC's Grimm and Freeform's The Fosters. She went on to star in Camp Harlow and Forgotten Hero, and guest star on NBC's Brooklyn Nine-Nine.

In 2015, Brown landed the recurring role of Evangeline "Evie" Murphy in seasons 2 and 3 of HBO's The Leftovers. Evie is the daughter of Erika and John who goes missing with her friends after an earthquake. Following The Leftovers, Brown was cast as Nina (Cameron's new girlfriend) on Freeform's Stitchers. They went on to play series regular character Emilia Bassano on the TNT drama series Will, which told the story of William Shakespeare. Emilia was a musician, poet, and writer, who went on to become the first female professional English poet and was believed to be the "Dark Lady" of Will's sonnets.

Brown is a series regular in the Shondaland drama For the People on ABC. Two weeks before the premiere of For the People, she signed with ICM Partners. They were cast in the independent film Sound of Violence as Alexis Reeves, a formerly deaf girl who goes on a murder spree. Initially titled Conductor, the film was released in 2021 to positive reviews for Brown's acting. Jessica Kiang of Variety wrote that Brown gave "a lead performance that oozes empathy as much as her hapless victims ooze blood". Also in 2021, they began starring in the Showtime thriller drama series Yellowjackets as a teenage Taissa Turner.

In September 2020, Brown was cast as Mindy Meeks-Martin in the fifth Scream film, which was directed by Matt Bettinelli-Olpin and Tyler Gillett. The film was released on January 14, 2022. It was a critical and commercial success, and was the 28th-highest-grossing film of 2022. She reprised the role in Scream VI, which was released on March 10, 2023, to similar success, and again in Scream 7. Richard Roeper of the Chicago Sun-Times called Brown "a scene-stealer as Mindy". She appeared in the 2024 film Dreams in Nightmares.

They also have released at least two songs; "Orange Wine" and "goddamnit" on YouTube.

On September 1, Brown made her Broadway debut as Eurydice in Hadestown.

== Personal life ==
Brown is queer, and uses both she/her and they/them pronouns.

== Filmography ==
=== Film ===
Year	Title	Role	Notes
2014	Laggies	Music Kid	
2014	The Record Keeper	Patience	
2014	Camp Harlow	Emily	
2014	Forgotten Hero	Anna	
2017	Ten Dollar Bill	Stephanie	
2017	Lane 1974	Puma	
2017	Newly Single	Taylor Touring	
2021	Sound of Violence	Alexis Reeves	
2022	Scream	Mindy Meeks-Martin	
2023	Scream VI	Mindy Meeks-Martin	
2023	Missing	June Allen	Cameo
2024	Dreams in Nightmares	Sabrina	
2026	Scream 7	Mindy Meeks-Martin	
2026	Teenage Sex and Death at Camp Miasma	Mari	
TBA	Green Bank †		

=== Television ===
Year	Title	Role	Notes
2013	Grimm	Young Woman	Episode: "A Dish Best Served Cold"
2013	The Fosters	Gossip Girl #2	Episode: "Kids in the Hall"
2014	Brooklyn Nine-Nine	Ava Watson / Rebecca Lubbock	Episode: "The Mole"
2015–2017	The Leftovers	Evangeline Murphy	Recurring role; 13 episodes
2016	Stitchers	Nina	Recurring role; 7 episodes
2016	Before You Say I Do	Hannah	Television film
2017	Grey's Anatomy	Amanda Joseph	Episode: "You Can Look (But You'd Better Not Touch)"
2017	Will	Emilia Bassano	Recurring role; 5 episodes
2018–2019	For the People	Allison Adams	Main role
2018	Love	Annie	3 episodes
2018	Lego Star Wars: All-Stars	Lena Freemaker	Voice, 2 episodes
2021	Final Space	Evra	Voice, episode: "Forgiveness"
2021–present	Yellowjackets	Teen Taissa Turner	Main role

=== Video games ===
Year	Title	Role	Notes
2019	Wolfenstein: Youngblood	Abby "Super Spesh" Walker	Voice and motion capture
2020	Spider-Man: Miles Morales	Phin Mason / Tinkerer	Voice and motion capture

=== Theater ===
Year	Title	Role	Venue	Notes
2026	Hadestown	Eurydice	Walter Kerr Theatre	Broadway debut

=== Music videos ===
- "Night Shift" (2023), by Lucy Dacus

=== Podcasts ===
- #63 Jasmin on Heavyweight
