= Päivälehti =

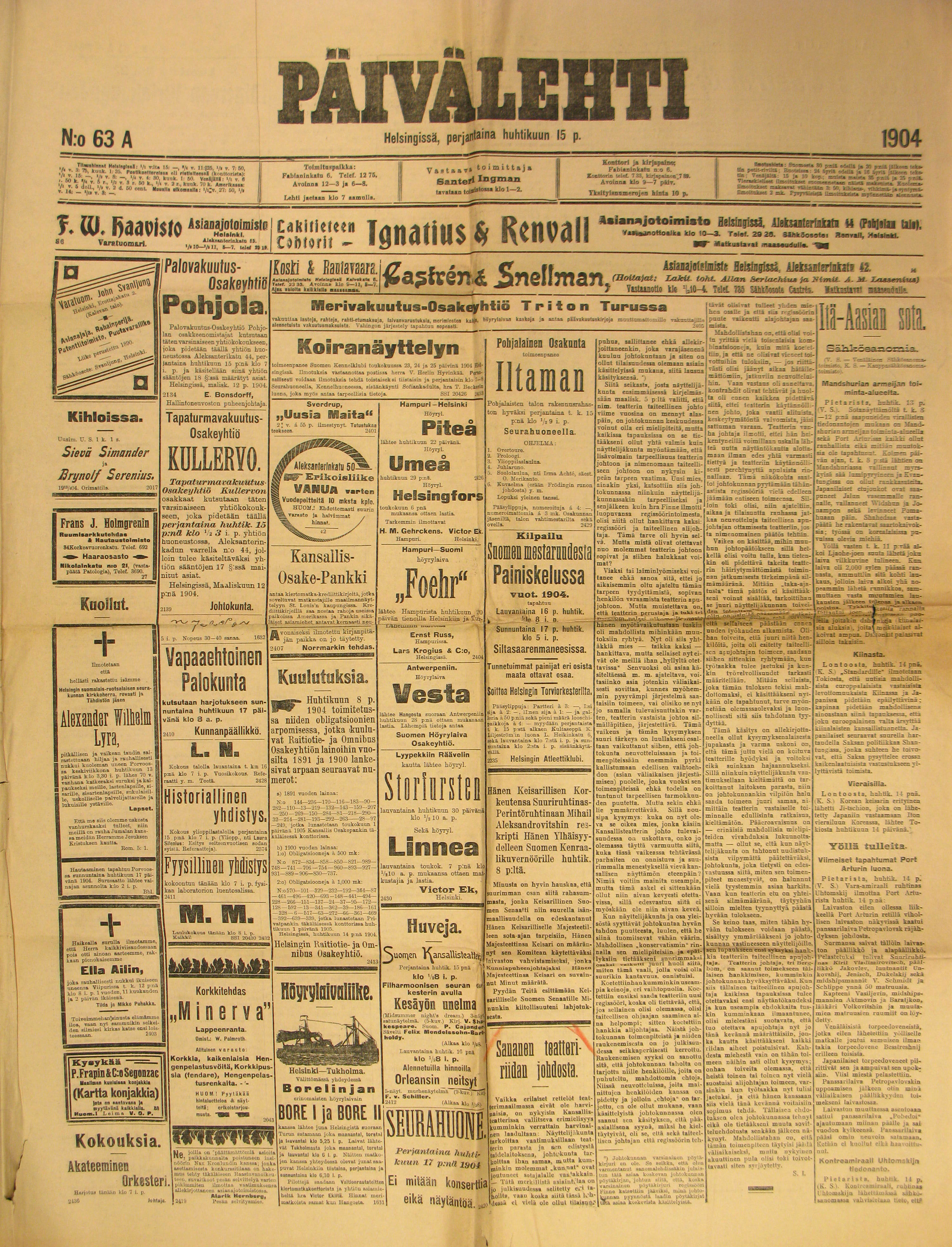
Päivälehti, 15 April 1904

Päivälehti (meaning "Daily") was a newspaper in Finland, which was then a Grand Duchy under the Czar of Russia. The paper was founded in 1889 as the organ of the Young Finnish Party and was published six days a week. The founding company of the paper was Sanoma which also started its activities the same year. The founder of the paper was the Finnish journalist and later politician Eero Erkko who also served as its editor-in-chief.

Political censorship by the Russian authorities, prompted by the paper's strong advocacy of greater Finnish freedoms and even outright independence, forced Päivälehti to often temporarily suspend publication. In June 1904, a week after Governor-General Nikolai Ivanovich Bobrikov was assassinated by Eugen Schauman, Päivälehti published an editorial about how at the time of mid-summer, the light wins against the darkness after all. As a consequence of this, the paper was closed permanently the same year.

In its place, the owners founded the newspaper Helsingin Sanomat, only four days after the last issue of Päivälehti.
