= Richard Seppälä =

Finnish diplomat and lawyer (1905–1997)

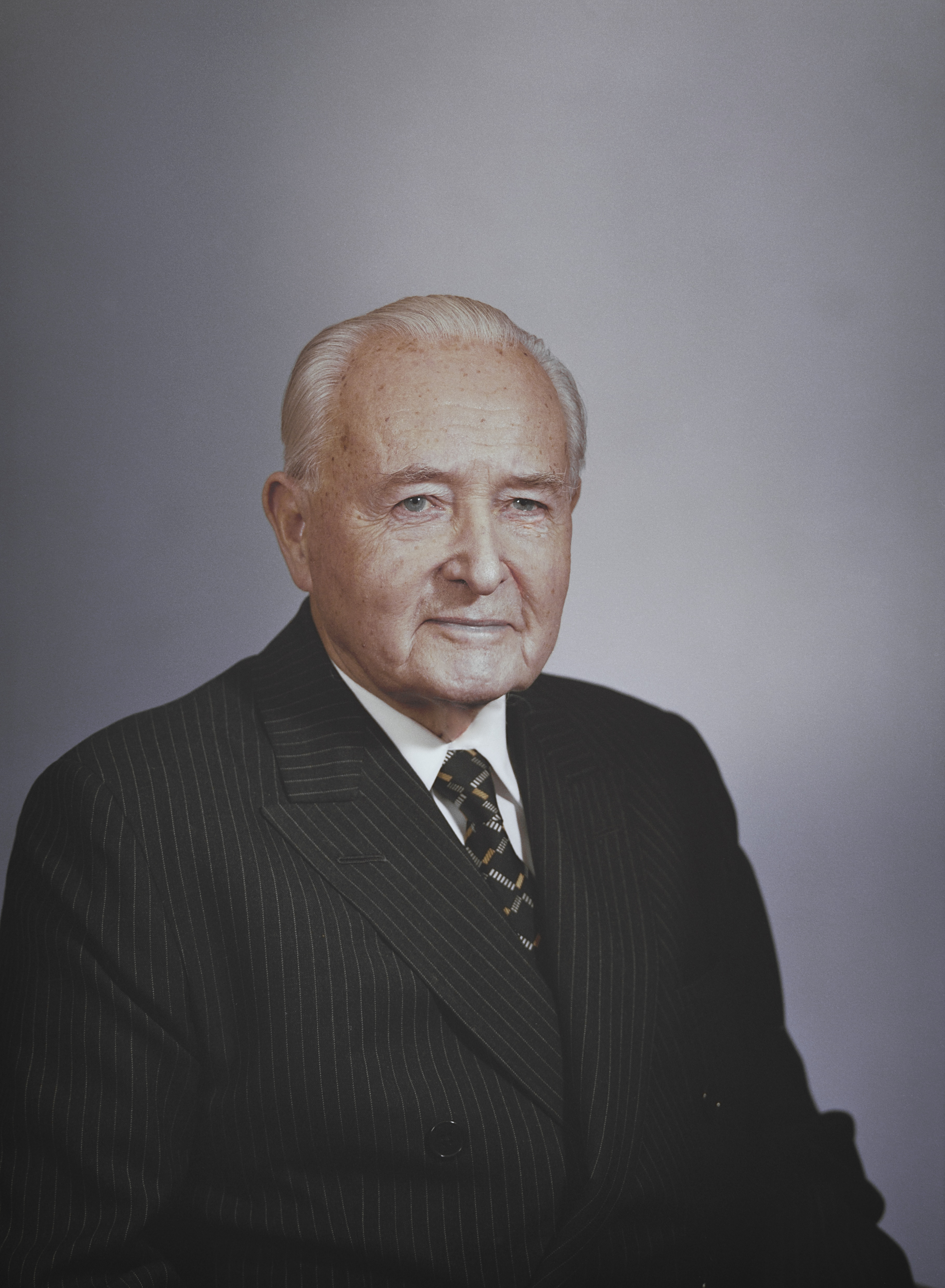

Finland Ambassador to France
- In office 1956–1958

Finland Ambassador to the United States
- In office 1958–1965

Finland Ambassador to Colombia
- In office 1962–1964

Finland Ambassador to Venezuela
- In office 1958–1964

Finland Ambassador to Mexico
- In office 1961–1964

Finland Ambassador to Cuba
- In office 1958–1964

Finland Ambassador to France
- In office 1965–1972

Richard Rafael (R. R.) Seppälä (15 January 1905 Pori – 25 September 1997 Helsinki) was a Finnish diplomat.

Seppälä's parents were merchant Juho Seppälä and Aurora Maria Sotka. Seppälä wrote a matriculation certificate in 1924, graduated in 1929 and received a degree certificate of 1936.

After working for a year in the law office, he joined the Ministry for Foreign Affairs and served as Assistant at the Finnish Representationin Riga, 1930–1932 and in Rio de Janeiro, 1932–1934.

He was in the position of the deputy secretary in Helsinki but moved to 1937 as secretary to London.

During the Winter War he contributed to the arrival of English volunteers in Finland. When the United Kingdom declared war on Finland at the end of 1941, the Finnish Mission in London ceased and Seppälä returned to Helsinki as the division chief.

He served as Deputy Director General of the Political Department from 1943 to 1947, Head of Department and Head of department from 1947 to 1948.

Between 1948 and 1953, Seppälä was Finland's Consul General in New York and Finnish Permanent Observer to the United Nations

Since then, he served as Secretary of State for Foreign Affairs in 1953–1956 and as State Secretary in 1955–1956.

Seppälä's career culminated in the Finnish Ambassador in Paris 1956–1958, in Washington, 1958–1965, as Envoy to Colombia from 1958 to 1962 (Ambassador 1962–1964), in Venezuela from 1958 to 1964, as Envoy to Mexico in 1958–1961 (Ambassador 1961–1964) Cuba in 1958–1964 and again as Ambassador to Paris 1965–1972.

With Finland joining the OECD, he also served as a Representative of Finland in that organization from 1968 to 1969. As a diplomat, Seppälä has been said to have avoided politics.

Seppälä's first wife was English-born, Isabelle Mary Durrant-Fox, The marriage ended in 1952 in divorce. They had two children. Christopher ("Risto") R. Seppälä. Born 1941. Elizabeth M. Seppälä Antelo. Born 1947. In 1953, Seppälä married Patricia Erkko (sister of Aatos Erkko). In 1982 they divorced. They had one child, a girl, Rafaela V. M. Seppälä. Born 1954.
