= Helsingin Sanomat =

Finnish daily newspaper

- Type: Daily newspaper
- Format: Compact
- Owner: Sanoma
- Editor: Erja Yläjärvi
- Founded: 1889; 137 years ago as Päivälehti; 1905 as Helsingin Sanomat
- Political alignment: Liberalism
- Language: Finnish
- Headquarters: Helsinki, Finland
- Circulation: 120,000 (2024)
- Website: www.hs.fi

Helsingin Sanomat (meaning "The Helsinki Dispatch"), abbreviated HS and colloquially known as Hesari, is the largest subscription newspaper in Finland, owned by Sanoma. Except after certain holidays, it is published daily. Its name derives from that of the Finnish capital, Helsinki, where it is published. It is considered a newspaper of record for Finland.

== History and profile ==
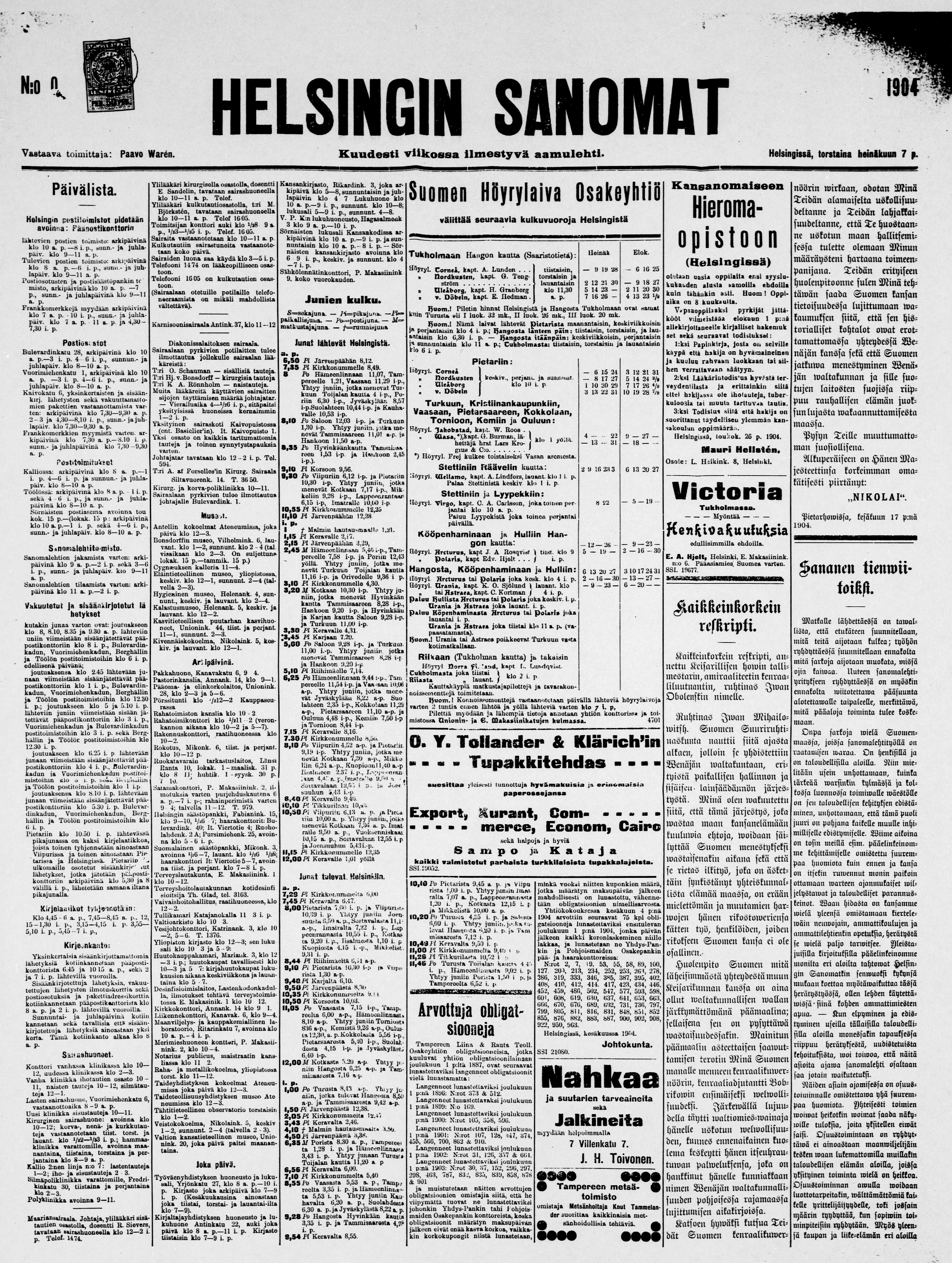
The front page of the Helsingin Sanomat for July 7, 1904. This was the first issue published under the new name, days after Päivälehti had been banned from publication.

The paper was founded in 1889 as Päivälehti, when Finland was a Grand Duchy under the Tsar of Russia.

Political censorship by the Russian authorities, prompted by the paper's strong advocacy of greater Finnish freedoms and even outright independence, forced Päivälehti to often temporarily suspend publication, and finally to close permanently in 1904. Its proprietors re-opened the paper under its current name later that same year. In December 1904, Helsingin Sanomat adopted its distinctive Art Nouveau masthead logo, which has been revised several times but remains in use today.

Founded as the organ of the Young Finnish Party, the paper has been politically independent and non-aligned since 1932. During the Cold War period Helsingin Sanomat was among the Finnish newspapers which were accused by the Soviet Union of being the instrument of US propaganda, and the Soviet Embassy in Helsinki frequently protested the editors of the paper.

Helsingin Sanomat has a long history as a family business, owned by the Erkko family. It is currently owned by the Sanoma media group which also owns Ilta-Sanomat. The relationship between the owners of Helsingin Sanomat and Finland's government have sometimes been close. For instance, during the run-up to the Winter War, Eljas Erkko was at the same time the paper's publisher and Finland's foreign minister.

Helsingin Sanomat strongly advocated Finland joining the European Union in the run-up to the decision to do so in 1994. It has also openly expressed support for Finland's membership of NATO.

Mikael Pentikäinen was the editor-in-chief until May 2013 when he was fired from the post. Riikka Venäläinen replaced him temporarily in the post. After Riikka Venäläinen the post has been held by Kaius Niemi.

After the 2022 Russian invasion of Ukraine, the newspaper established a Russian-language news website to cover the war. In May 2022, Russian authorities blocked access to the website of the newspaper.

On 5 April 2023, editor-in-chief Kaius Niemi was arrested for driving under the influence. He was fined in court and resigned from his post. Erja Yläjärvi became the new editor-in-chief in August.

== Format ==
Helsingin Sanomat is published daily in Finnish in compact format with the exception of the days after public holidays when the paper does not appear. Subscriptions make up 97% of the newspaper's circulation. The front page is usually devoted to advertisements.

The newspaper was published in broadsheet format until 6 January 2013.

The paper also has a monthly supplement named Kuukausiliite (Finnish for Monthly Supplement), and a weekly TV guide and entertainment-oriented supplement named Nyt (meaning Now in English). Between 1999 and 2012 there were also both Finnish and English-language online newspaper editions.

Content of Helsingin Sanomat can be accessed also through mobile devices.

== Circulation and influence ==
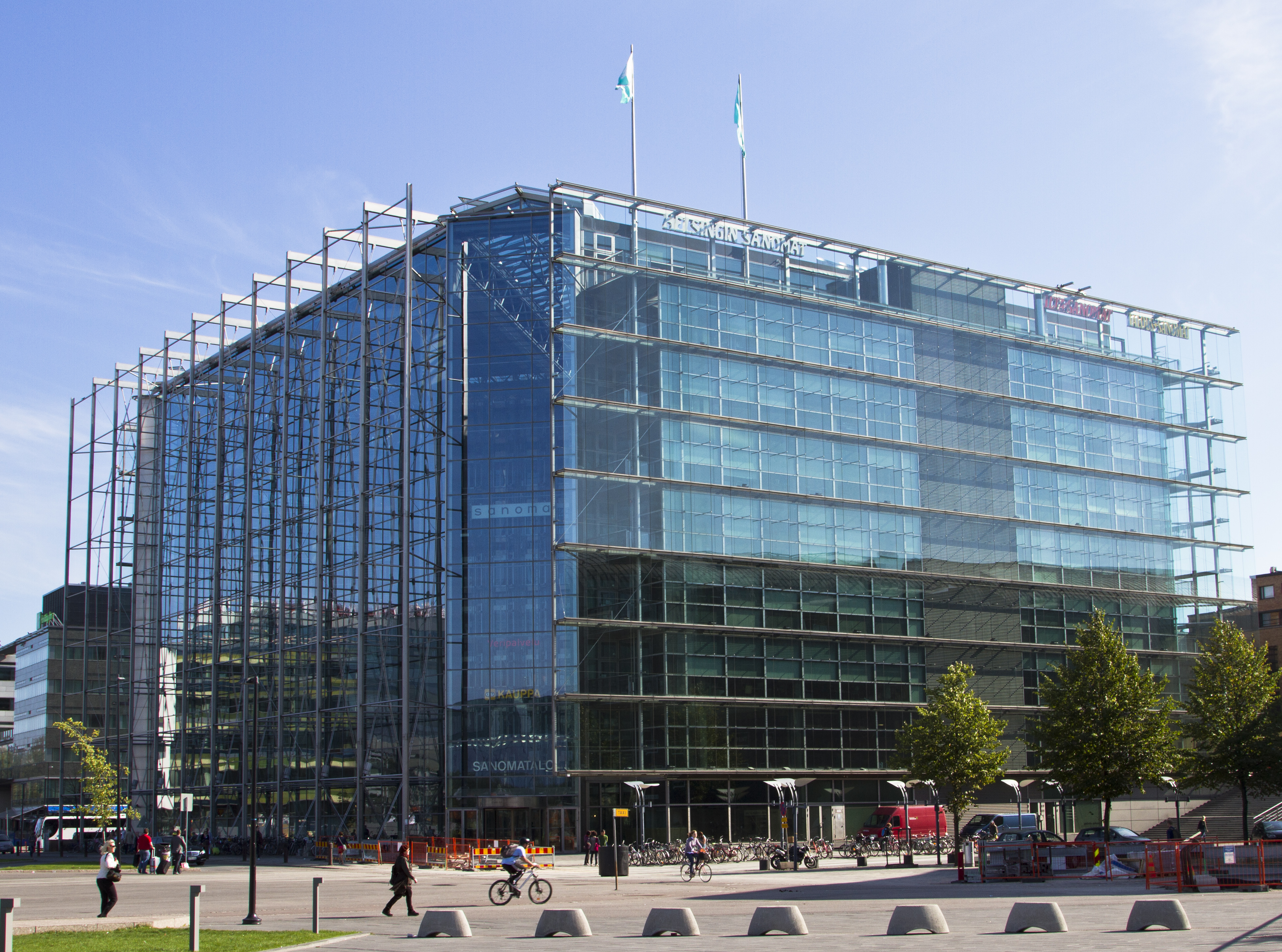
Current office in Sanomatalo, Helsinki

The circulation of Helsingin Sanomat was 476,163 copies in 1993, making it the most read newspaper in Finland. In the period of 1995–96 the paper sold 470,600 copies. Its circulation was 446,380 copies in 2001, making it the largest paper in the country. In 2008 the paper sold 412,421 on weekdays (a change of −1.8% from 2007) and 468,505 copies on Sundays (−1.3%). In 2011 the daily had a circulation of 365,994 copies, making it the most read paper in the country. The same year it was also the largest paper in terms of readership.

Approximately 75% of households in the Helsinki metropolitan area subscribe to Helsingin Sanomat, and it functions as the region's local paper. Its total daily circulation is well over 400,000, or about 8% of Finland's total population. This reaches about 14% of all households in Finland.

The paper is a significant factor in Finnish society and in public opinion. Pertti Klemola, a Finnish journalist and scholar, once called it a state authority, an institution with its own independent social and political will.

In June 2009 the site was the sixth most popular Finnish website. In 2010 it was the seventh most visited website in Finland in 2010 and was visited by 1,236,527 people per week.

== Helsingin Sanomat International Edition ==
The English-language section of the Helsingin Sanomat website, the Helsingin Sanomat International Edition (HSIE), ran for thirteen years.

The International Edition launched on 14 September 1999 with the aim of informing readers of news from Finland during the Finnish presidency of the European Union. It continued after the European presidency owing to the quantity of readers it was getting became one of the major English-language sources of news regarding Finland—making it popular with English-speaking immigrants to the country.

The Helsingin Sanomat International Edition closed down on 26 October 2012. English material is now published in cooperation with Helsinki Times weekly newspaper. For a while, Helsingin Sanomat also published some of its material in Russian, but the service was discontinued on 6 October 2014.

== See also ==
- List of Finnish newspapers
