= David Diliberto =

American filmmaker

- Born: April 29, 1970 (age 55)
- Occupation: Filmmaker

David Diliberto (born April 29, 1970) is an American filmmaker.

As a longtime collaborator of Joel and Ethan Coen, Diliberto was a part of several innovations in post-production technologies. He supervised the first digital intermediate on a full feature with the film O Brother, Where Art Thou? Diliberto configured Final Cut Pro systems that could emulate the Coens' traditional film editing techniques in a digital realm. Intolerable Cruelty was the first major studio film edited on Apple Computer's Final Cut Pro software.

== Filmography ==
- Burn After Reading - Associate Producer
- Order Up - Producer
- No Country For Old Men (film) - Associate Producer
- The Ladykillers - Associate Producer
- Intolerable Cruelty - Associate Editor
- Bob - Writer, Director
- The Man Who Wasn't There - Associate Editor
- A Pork Chop for Larry - Writer, Director
- O Brother Where Art Thou? - Associate Editor
- The Big Lebowski - Associate Editor
- Night Falls on Manhattan - Assistant Editor
- Fargo - Assistant Editor
- Something to Talk About (film) - Assistant Editor
- The Hudsucker Proxy - Apprentice Editor
