= Palovesi =

Lake in Ruovesi, Finland

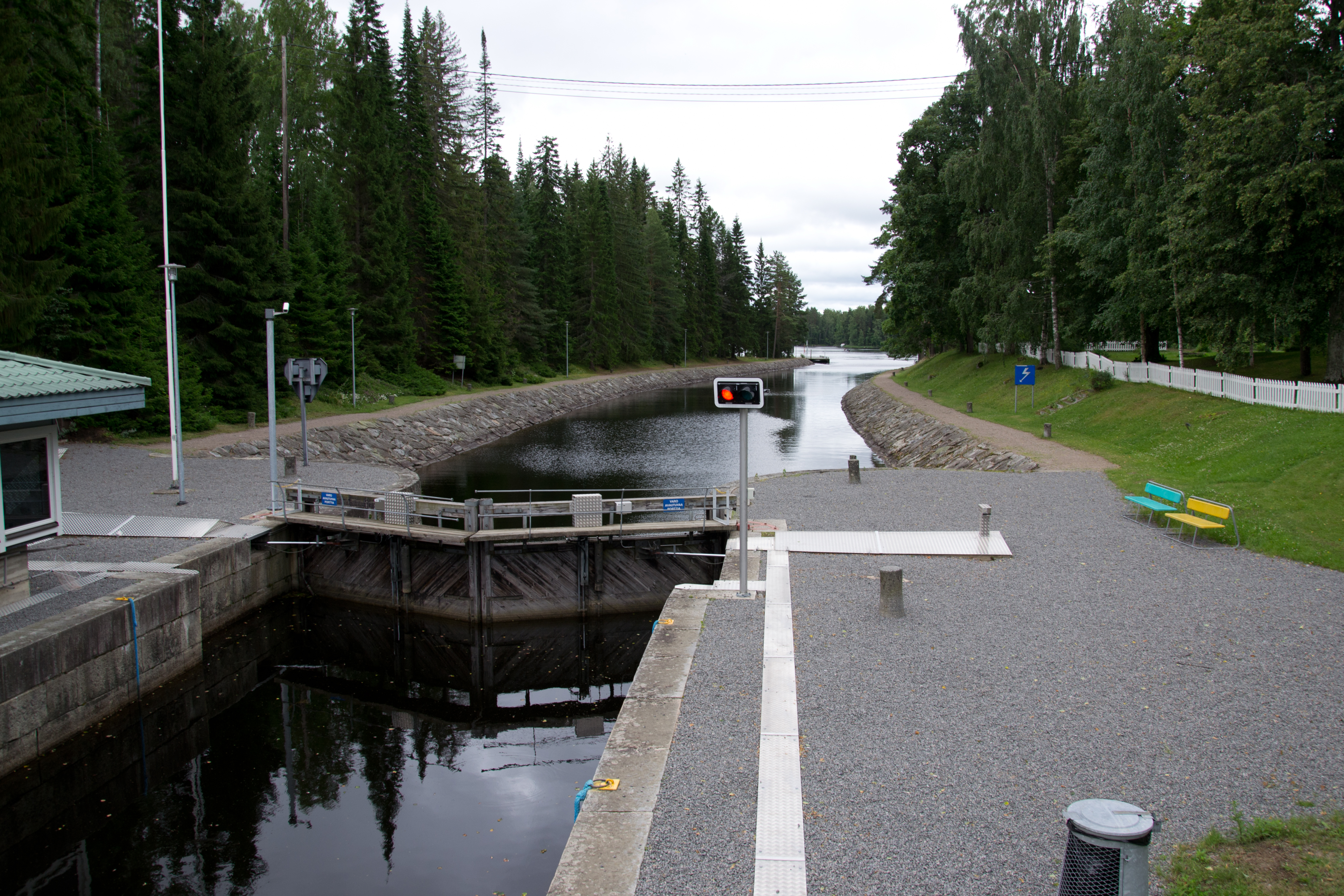
- The Murole channel.
- Interactive map of Palovesi
- Location: Pirkanmaa
- Coordinates: 31°53′44″N 23°56′36″E
- Basin countries: Finland
- Surface area: 210 km^{2} (81 sq mi)
- Max. depth: 96 m (315 ft)
- Water volume: 1,724 ha (4,260 acres) (Jäminginselkä); 2,548 ha (6,300 acres) (Palovesi)
- Surface elevation: 1,724 m (5,656 ft)

Palovesi or sometimes Palovesi–Jäminginselkä is a lake in Ruovesi, Pirkanmaa. It is the 89th largest lake in Finland.

If the basin of the Vaskivesi – Visuvesi, Palovesi-Jäminginselkä and Tarjanne lakes is interpreted as the Great Trajanus, its area reaches about 210 square kilometres (81 sq mi), which makes this the 18th largest lake in Finland.

== Introduction ==
Lake Palovesi-Jäminginselkä has an area of 42.7 square kilometres (16.5 sq mi) and a depth of 96 metres (315 ft).

The Jäminginselkä section (lake number 35.322.1.001) has an area of 1,724 hectares (4,260 acres). The Palovesi part (lake number 35.321.1.001) has an area of 2,548 hectares (6,300 acres).
