= John Wodehouse =

John Wodehouse may refer to:.

- John Wodehouse (died 1431) MP for Norfolk (UK Parliament constituency) and Suffolk (UK Parliament constituency), possibly distinguished himself at the Battle of Agincourt, and ancestor of the Wodehouse of Kimberly noble family, see Wodehouse (surname)
- Sir John Wodehouse, 4th Baronet (1669–1754)
- John Wodehouse, 1st Baron Wodehouse (1741–1834)
- John Wodehouse, 2nd Baron Wodehouse (1770–1846)
- John Wodehouse, 1st Earl of Kimberley (1826–1902)
- John Wodehouse, 2nd Earl of Kimberley (1848–1932)
- John Wodehouse, 3rd Earl of Kimberley (1883–1941)
- John Wodehouse, 4th Earl of Kimberley (1924–2002)
- John Wodehouse, 5th Earl of Kimberley (born 1951)

== See also ==
- Earl of Kimberley
- John Woodhouse (disambiguation)
