= Wodehouse (surname) =

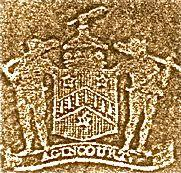
The family coat of arms as shown on a stamp used by John Wodehouse, 1st Earl of Kimberley (1826–1902); Sable a chevron or goutty de sang between three cinquefoils

The medieval family coat of arms before its augmentation after the Battle of Agincourt: Sable a chevron or between three cinquefoils.

Wodehouse (/ˈwʊdhaʊs/ "wood-house") is an English surname and barony.

The baronetcy was created in 1611, the barony in 1797. Since 1866 it has been held by the Earl of Kimberley, the current Baron Wodehouse being John Wodehouse, 5th Earl of Kimberley (born 1951).

== History ==
The earliest references to Wodehouse as a surname are in the late 11th century; a Bertram de Wodehouse, lived in Yorkshire, at a place known as Wodehouse Tower, at the time of the Norman conquest. (The exact location of this "Wodehouse Tower" is unclear, but may have been near the modern Woodhouse, South Yorkshire.)

An elaborate pedigree of the Wodehouse family is on record beginning with Sir David Wodehouse (b.1053), the father of Sir Constantine de Wodehouse (b.1080) -who was married to Lady Isobel Botetourt (b.1085).

John Wodehouse (died 1431), Member of Parliament for Norfolk and Suffolk, was the first of the family to be documented as resident in Norfolk; he arrived there as an outside administrator for the Duchy of Lancaster.

The augmented coat of arms of Wodehouse from this time has been blazoned sable a chevron or, gutte de sang, between three cinquefoils ermine with the crest on a wreath, an arm erect, holding a club in the hand and on a scroll the motto frappe forte^, i. e. "strike strong", and at the bottom Agincourt, supported by two wild men.

A term for "wild man", woodwose (from a putative Old English *wude-wāsa "wood-being"), has been transformed to woodhouse by popular etymology due to their appearance as supporters in the Woodhouse coat of arms.

== Prominent Wodehouses ==
Local gentry

- Sir Roger Woodhouse or Wodehouse (d. 1560), who married Elizabeth Radcliffe, daughter of Sir Robert Radcliffe of Hunstanton, the parents of:
- Thomas Woodhouse, present at the battle of Pinkie in September 1547, some sources suggest he was killed there, who married Madge Shelton, possible mistress of Henry VIII and first cousin of Anne Boleyn, and had Roger Woodhouse (c. 1541 – 1588), English politician, below:

Politicians

- Roger Woodhouse (c. 1541 – 1588), of Kimberley, Norfolk, English politician, father of Sir Philip Wodehouse, 1st Baronet, below:

Peers

Baronets

- The baronetcy was created in 1611, for Sir Philip Wodehouse, 1st Baronet (died 1623), MP
- Sir Thomas Wodehouse, 2nd Baronet (c. 1585 – 1658), MP
- Sir Philip Wodehouse, 3rd Baronet (1608–1681), MP
- Sir John Wodehouse, 4th Baronet (1669–1754), British MP
- Sir Armine Wodehouse, 5th Baronet (c. 1714 – 1777), MP for Norfolk

Barons

- John Wodehouse, 6th Baronet (1741–1834), was created Baron Wodehouse in 1797.
- John Wodehouse, 2nd Baron Wodehouse (1771–1846), British MP and then peer

Earls of Kimberley

- in 1866, John Wodehouse, 3rd Baron (1826–1902) was created Earl of Kimberley
- John Wodehouse, 2nd Earl of Kimberley (1848–1932), first member of the Labour Party in the House of Lords
- John Wodehouse, 3rd Earl of Kimberley (1883–1941)
- John Wodehouse, 4th Earl of Kimberley (1924–2002)
- John Wodehouse, 5th Earl of Kimberley (born 1951)

Others

Sir Armine Wodehouse, 5th Baronet, had an older brother, William Wodehouse (possibly 1706–1737), who died of smallpox. Other descendants of Sir Armine Wodehouse include:

- Reverend Philip Wodehouse (1745–1811), son of Sir Armine Wodehouse, 5th Baronet
  - Lt.-Col. Philip Wodehouse (1788–1846), 15th The King's Hussars (Battle of Waterloo)
    - Colonel Edwin Wodehouse (1817–1870), son of Philip Wodehouse (1773–1838)
      - Sir Frederick Wodehouse (c. 1850 – 1934), senior British police officer, son of Edwin Wodehouse
    - Reverend Frederick Armine Wodehouse (1842 – c. 1921), son of Philip Wodehouse (1788–1846)
      - Norman Wodehouse (1887–1941), Royal Navy vice-admiral, son of Reverend Frederick Armine Wodehouse (1842 – c. 1921)
    - Henry Ernest Wodehouse (1845–1929), son of Philip Wodehouse (1788–1846)
      - P. G. Wodehouse (1881–1975), English humor writer, son of Henry Ernest Wodehouse
      - Richard Wodehouse (1892–1940), cricketer, son of Henry Ernest Wodehouse (brother of P. G. Wodehouse)
- Edmond Wodehouse (1784–1855), MP for Norfolk, and later, Norfolk East, son of Thomas Wodehouse, younger son of Sir Armine Wodehouse, 5th Baronet
  - Philip Wodehouse (1811–1887), British colonial administrator, eldest son of Edmond Wodehouse
    - Edmond Wodehouse (1835–1914), British Unionist politician, only child of Philip Edmond Wodehouse
- Armine Wodehouse (MP) (1860–1941), MP for Saffron Walden, a younger son of John Wodehouse, 1st Earl of Kimberley
