= Cueva de la Pileta =

Cave and archaeological site in Spain

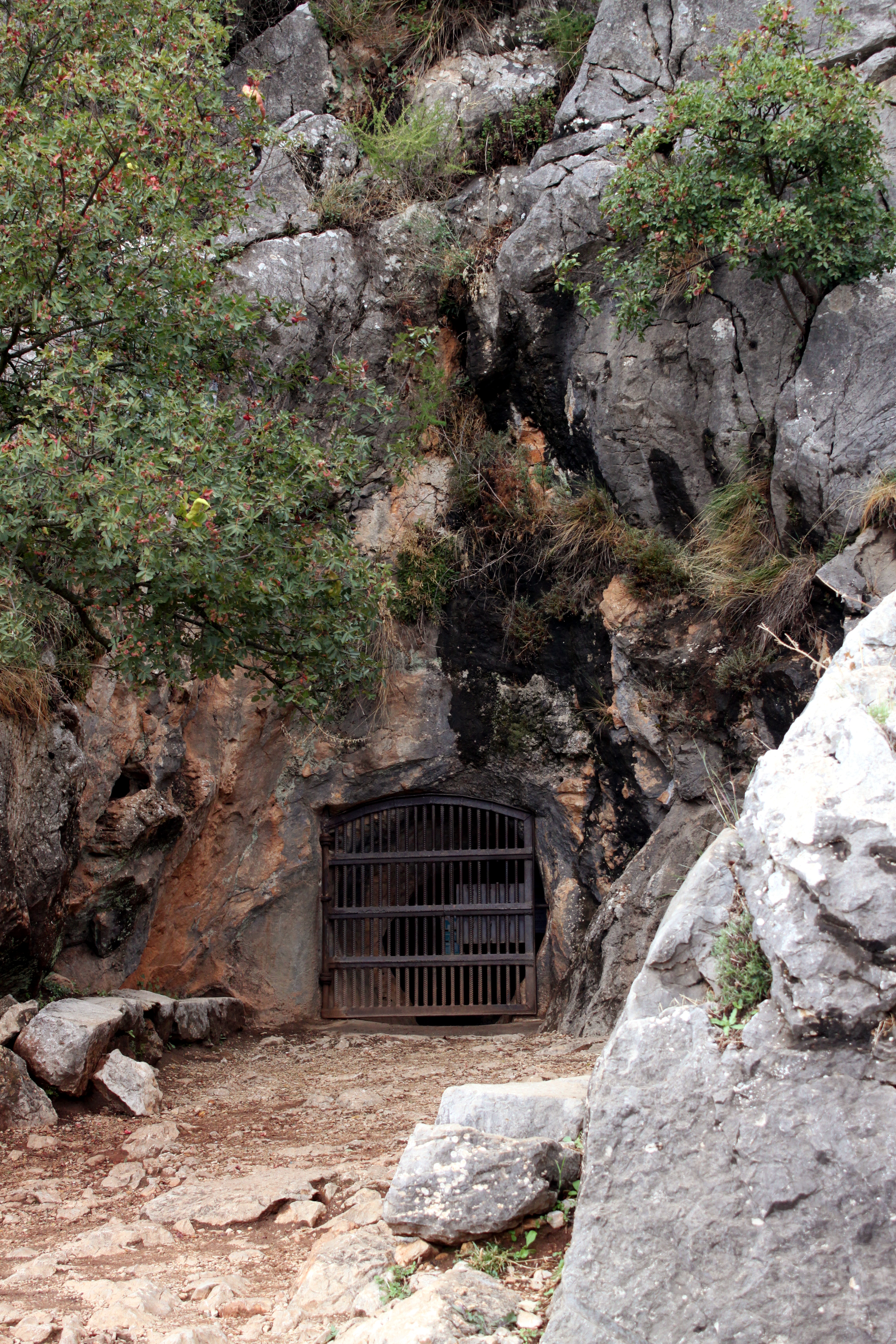

- Location within Andalusia
- Location: Benaoján
- Coordinates: 36.6912°N 5.2699°W
- Discovery: 1905
- Geology: Limestone
- Entrances: 1

Cueva de la Pileta ("Cave of the Pool") is a cave in the province of Málaga, Spain, that was discovered in 1905 and contains cave paintings.

== Investigation ==
The cave was investigated by Abbe Henri Breuil, a French-Catholic priest, archaeologist, anthropologist, ethnologist, and geologist, who had come to Spain following a report by Colonel Verner of its existence in Benaoján, near Ronda. Verner himself had been told of the cave after it was discovered by a Spanish farmer called José Bullón in 1905 while looking for bat guano around the original entrance in a place called the "chasm of the bats". He had assumed that the cave markings were made by Moors. He had found human remains and markings on the walls. Verner had himself lowered into the cave and later reported his findings which attracted international interest.

Breuil was able to identify nearly fifty drawings and some of these resembled symbols. He stayed for two months funded by the Prince of Monaco. The final scientific paper was also authored by Verner. Breuil later showed interest in a Devil's Tower Cave in Gibraltar which eventually led to Dorothy Garrod discovering of the Gibraltar 2 neanderthal skull.

== Reassessment ==
Both skeletons and pottery present indicated that the cave must have a better entrance and dating indicated that the remains went back to the Neolithic. Some of the wall decorations and skeletons were thought to be more recent and to have resulted from people who got lost in the cave. The son of the man who found the cave managed to find a better entrance in 1924 and that is the one used today. The same man made a discovery of an unknown chamber that gave access to galleries (Las Galerias Nuevas) which contained stalactites. These galleries linked up with known areas. A deep chasm is accessed down the longest of these galleries which is 350 metres long.

A husband and wife team re-investigated the cave in 1978 including the newly discovered galleries. They were able to identify 134 paintings although those discovered by Breuil were now not identifiable. There may be further Paleolithic paintings but many of the surfaces are now covered by flowstone. Dating of the larger paintings has estimated them to be over 20,000 years old.

== Today ==
The cave today is operated by Bullón's descendants who limit groups to no more than 20 people—as of 2017 reservations must be made in advance.
