= George Simmons =

George Simmons may refer to:

- George Simmons (British Army officer) (1785–1858), British Army officer wounded at the Battle of Waterloo
- George Simmons (referee) (1866–1954), English football referee
- George A. Simmons (1791–1857), U.S. Representative from New York
- George F. Simmons (1925–2019), American mathematician
- George H. Simmons (1852–1937), English-born American physician

== See also ==
- George Simmonds (1895–1973), Australian rules footballer
- George Blackall Simonds (1843–1929), English sculptor
