= Willoughby Verner =

Soldier, writer and ornithologist

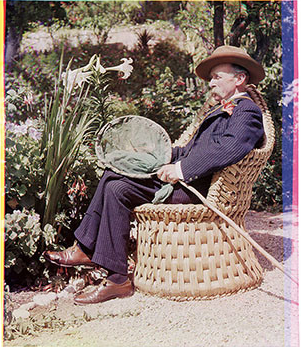
- Colonel Verner in a 1903 colour photograph by Sarah Angelina Acland
- Born: 22 October 1852
- Died: 25 January 1922 (aged 69); Algeciras
- Citizenship: United Kingdom
- Known for: Author, ornithologist, cave discoverer
- Military career
- Branch: British Army
- Rank: Colonel
- Unit: Rifle Brigade
- Conflicts: Boer War

Colonel William Willoughby Cole Verner (22 October 1852 – 25 January 1922) was a British soldier, writer, ornithologist, and inventor of a type of compass. He was briefly a Professor of Topography at the Royal Military Academy Sandhurst. He is remembered for bringing Cueva de la Pileta, a cave filled with prehistoric paintings, to international attention.

== Life ==
Verner was born in 1852 and he showed an early interest in bones collecting the fossils of extinct animals. By 1867 he had started his own diary recording his interest in egg collecting and shooting. In 1874 he joined the Rifle Brigade and was posted to Gibraltar although he also holidayed on the Scottish island of Tiree with fellow naturalist Howard Irby where they continued their interest in studying, shooting (and eating) the local wildlife. He continued his diary until 1890.

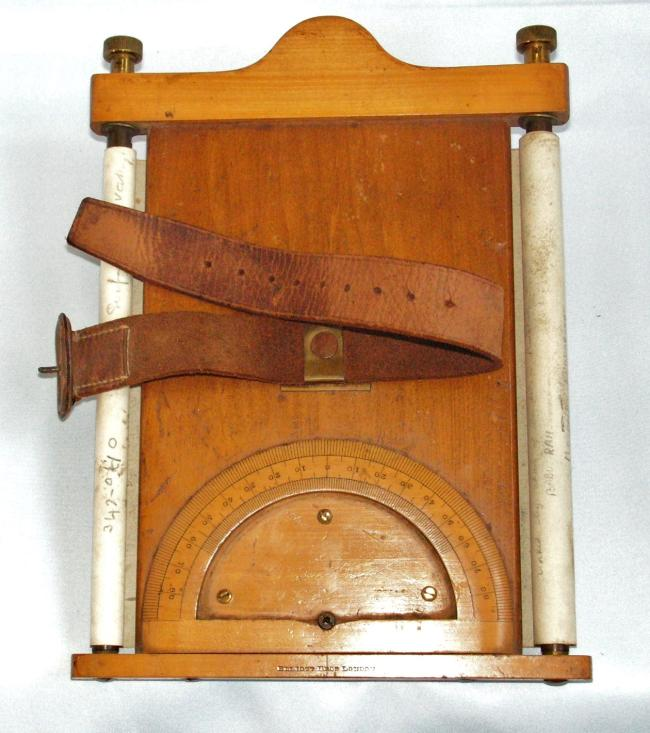
An Elliot Bros London First World War British Army military sketching board says "Major Verners Patent". It is 24 cm high and 17.5 cm wide.

He took out patents to improve a cavalry sketch board which was designed to be used strapped to the wrist. In 1895 Verner had a novel version of a prismatic compass named after him with a luminous dial. The compass was manufactured by two different companies and version nine of the design was still being made in 1942.

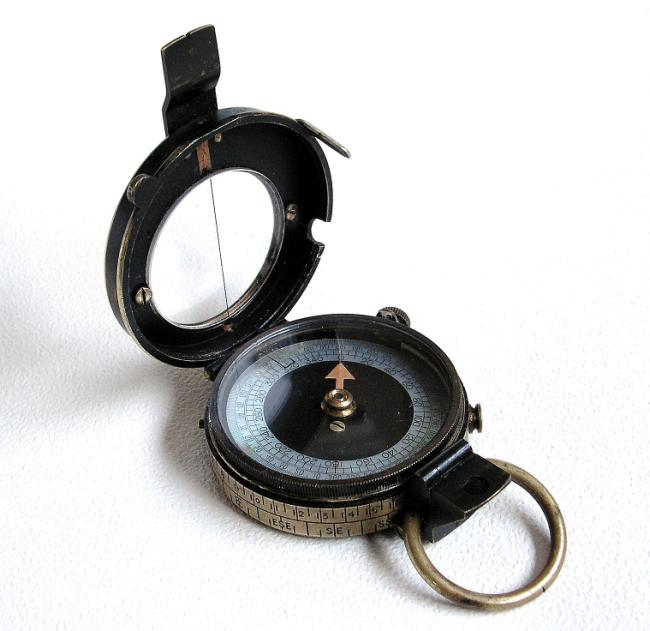
Verner's Pattern no VIII by a Swiss Clockmaker, Ed Koehn, dated 1916

Verner became the official historian of the Rifle Brigade and he edited the letters home of one of its majors to produce A British Rifle Man: The Journals and Correspondence of Major George Simmons, Rifle Brigade, during the Peninsular War & Campaign of Waterloo. He also wrote The Military Life of H. R. H. George: Duke of Cambridge based on Prince George, Duke of Cambridge.

He wrote Sketches in the Soudan (sic) in 1885 and Rapid Field-Sketching and Reconnaissance and Advanced Guard and Outpost Duties for Riflemen in 1889. The First British Rifle Corps. He wrote An historical account of the Rifle Brigade and of the King's Royal Rifle Corps in 1890 and Some Notes on Military Topography in 1891 and Map Reading and the Elements of Field Sketching in 1893. In 1894 his friend (Leonard) Howard Irby published The Ornithology of the Strait of Gibraltar and after he retired to Algeciras he wrote My Life among the Wild Birds in Spain. With illustrations in 1909.

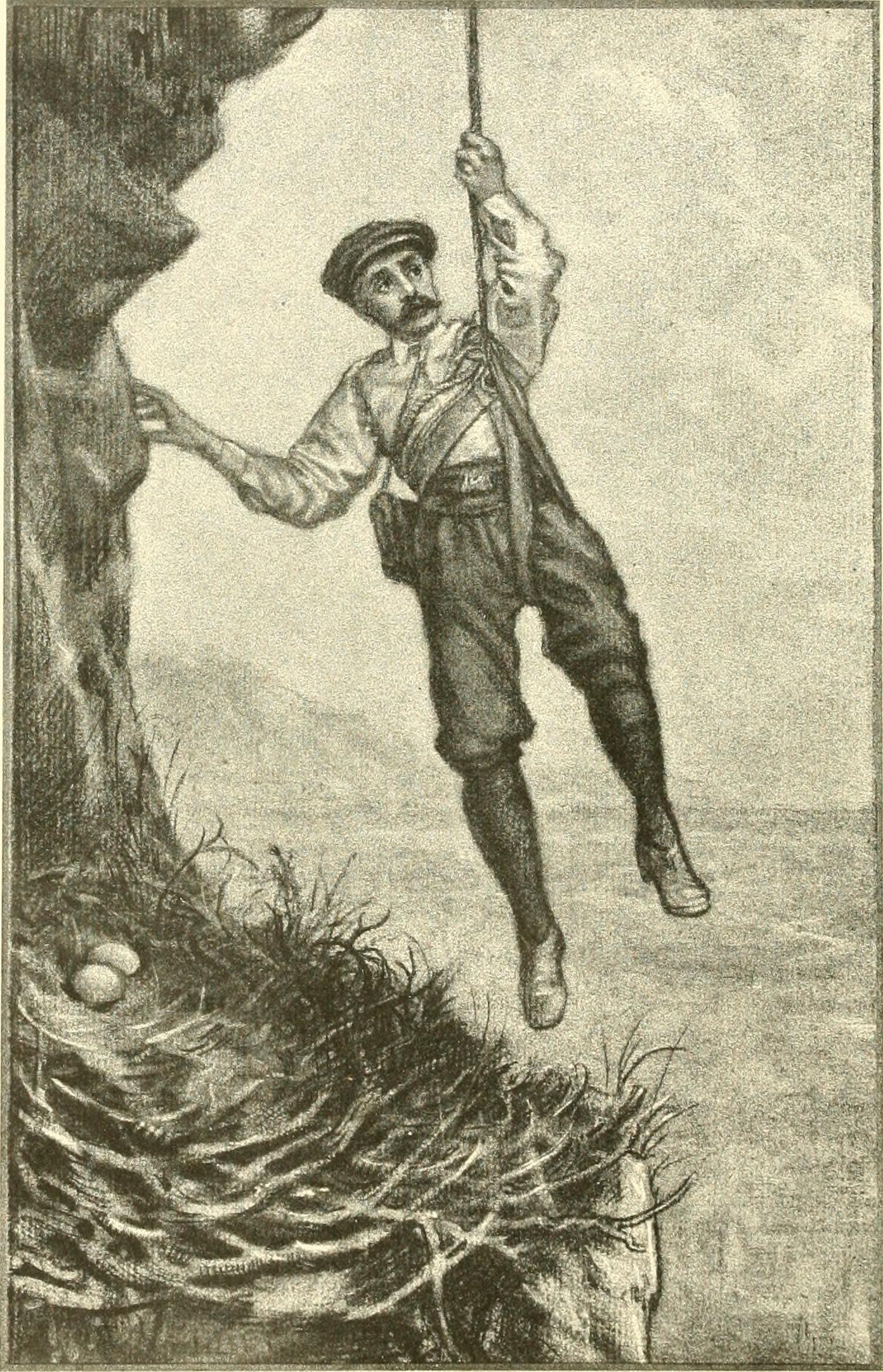
Verner climbing down to a bird's nest on a cliff ledge

In 1911, Verner discovered Cueva de la Pileta in Benaoján and with Abbe Breuil also discovered Devil's Tower Cave in Gibraltar. Breuil had come to Spain because of Verner's reporting of Cueva de la Pileta near Ronda. Verner had been told of the cave that had been discovered by a Spanish farmer called José Bullón in 1905 who was looking for bat guano. Bullón had found human remains and markings on the walls, but assumed that they were made by the Moors. Verner had himself lowered into the cave and later reported his findings in the London-based Saturday Review. Verner wrote a number of weekly reports for the Review which factually described the cave, although Verner accounted for the drawings of extinct animals by assuming that they had been sketched a result of observing the fossil bones that were there. It was these reports that brought Breuil to Spain with Hugo Obermaier, Paul Wernert and the Spaniard Juan Cabre Aquilo. Breuil stayed in Spain for two months studying the cave paintings whilst funded by the Prince of Monaco. Verner later co-authored a scientific paper with Breuil and Obermaier on Cueva de la Pileta.

Verner wrote History and Campaigns of the Rifle Brigade in 1912. In 1917 Breuil returned and he and Verner were warned off their next investigation of Devil's Tower Cave in Gibraltar by a local policeman (but not before they had retrieved some Neanderthal tools). Their final visit to the cave was in 1919 and they were convinced that this was another home to early man like the earlier finds at Cuerva de la Pieta and at Forbes' Quarry Cave, Gibraltar 1 had been found over fifty years earlier. Their confidence was confirmed when Gibraltar 2 was found nearby in the early 1920s by Dorothy Garrod who had come to investigate at Breuil's encouragement.
