= Carmel Maguire =

- Born: Carmel June Maguire; 1924; East Melbourne, Victoria, Australia
- Died: 21 July 1992 (aged 67–68); Sotogrande, Spain
- Cause of death: Homicide
- Other names: Carmel Dunnett; Carmel, Countess of Kimberley; Lady Kimberley; Carmel Lowndes
- Spouse(s): Derek Dunnett (m. 1944–1948); John Wodehouse, 4th Earl of Kimberley (m. 1949–1952); Jeremy Lowndes (m. 1954)
- Children: John Wodehouse, 5th Earl of Kimberley
- Relatives: Michael Maguire (father); Mary Maguire (sister)

Carmel June Maguire (1924–1992), also known as Carmel Dunnett, Carmel, Countess of Kimberley, and Carmel Lowndes, was an Australian-born society figure who was the second wife of John Wodehouse, 4th Earl of Kimberley between 1949 and 1952. She later married English landowner Jeremy Lowndes and died in Spain in 1992. Lowndes was convicted in a Spanish court in 1994 over her death.

== Early life ==
Maguire was one of five daughters of Michael Maguire, an Australian rules footballer, boxer and hotel-keeper. One of her sisters, Mary Maguire, was briefly active as an actor during the 1930s and 1940s. In British and Australian press coverage, the sisters were sometimes nicknamed the "Marrying Maguires" because of their high-profile marriages.

== Marriages ==
Maguire married Derek Dunnett in 1944. The marriage ended in divorce in December 1948.

In February 1949, Maguire married John Wodehouse, 4th Earl of Kimberley, in St. Moritz, Switzerland, becoming Countess of Kimberley. A son, John (known by the courtesy title Lord Wodehouse), was born in January 1951. The couple were divorced in 1952 with Maguire being granted custody of Lord Wodehouse.

In 1954, she married Jeremy Lowndes. In the 1980s, the couple had moved to Spain.

== Death ==
Maguire, then known as Carmel Lowndes, was found dead at the couple's villa in Sotogrande in southern Spain, on 21 July 1992. In 1994 a Spanish court in Cádiz found Jeremy Lowndes guilty of her death and sentenced him to nine years' imprisonment.
