= Margaret Irby =

The Right Honourable The Countess of Kimberley
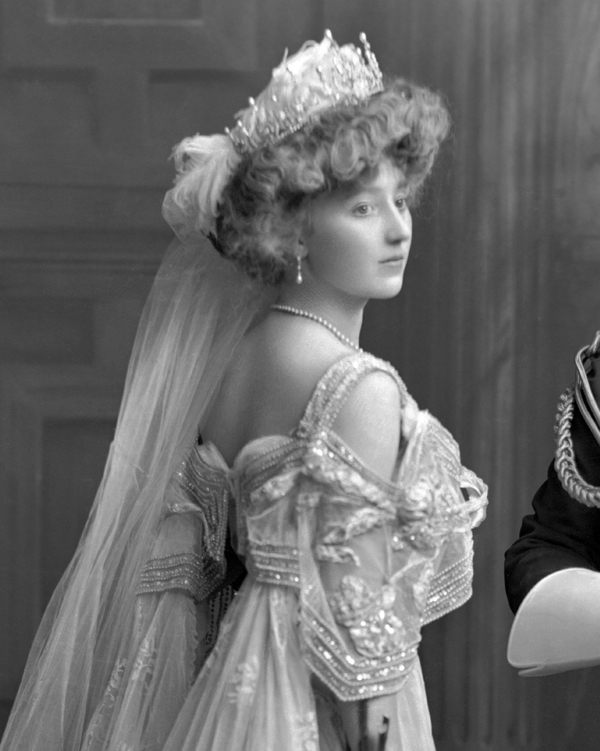
- Frances Margaret Irby at her Court Presentation in June 1906
- Born: Frances Margaret Irby; 1 December 1884
- Died: 4 January 1950 (aged 65)
- Occupation: Socialite
- Spouses: Morgan George Crofton, 6th Baronet (m. 1905; div. 1910) James Fountayne Montagu (m. 1910; div. 1921) John Wodehouse, 3rd Earl of Kimberley (m. 1922; died 1941)
- Children: Maj. Morgan George Crofton; John Wodehouse, 4th Earl of Kimberley
- Parent(s): Howard Irby; Mary Brandling

Frances Margaret Wodehouse, Countess of Kimberley (1 December 1884 – 4 January 1950), was an English socialite and member of the Bright Young Things. She married three times, always to members of the British aristocracy. She scandalised society when she went to live with her future second husband without waiting for her divorce to be effective.

== Biography ==
Frances Margaret Irby was the only daughter of Lt.-Col. Leonard Howard Loyd Irby and Mary Brandling.

From her presentation at court on 1 June 1906, presented by Lady de Blaquiere, Irby was, according to the journals of the time, somewhat wild. She married three times.

On 12 December 1905, Irby married Sir Morgan George Crofton, 6th Baronet (1879–1958), son of Capt. Edward Hugh Crofton and Isabel Annie Julia Miller; they divorced on 8 April 1910. They had one son, Major Morgan George Crofton (1907–1947). Irby left Crofton for James Montagu without waiting for the divorce, creating a huge scandal, since she went to live with Montagu.

On 22 October 1910 she married James Fountayne Montagu (1887–1971) of Papplewick Hall, son of James Wilson Montagu and Laura Adeline Thellusson; they divorced 1921.

On 5 May 1922 she married John Wodehouse, 3rd Earl of Kimberley, son of John Wodehouse, 2nd Earl of Kimberley, and Isabel Geraldine Stracey. When they married, a reporter asked the question "Can Lord Wodehouse's Love Tame His Lively Bride?" They had one son, John Wodehouse, 4th Earl of Kimberley (1924–2002).

Lady Kimberley died on 4 January 1950.
