= HMS Volcano =

Five ships of the Royal Navy have borne the name HMS Volcano. Two more were planned, but never completed:

- HMS Volcano (1778) was an 8-gun fireship purchased in 1778 and sold in 1781.
- HMS Volcano (1780) was an 8-gun fireship purchased in 1780 and sold in 1784.
- HMS Volcano (1797) was an 8-gun bomb vessel purchased in 1797 and sold in 1810.
- HMS Volcano (1804) was originally a 16-gun sloop named HMS Heron. She was reclassified as a bomb vessel in 1810 and renamed HMS Volcano. She was sold in 1816 and became the mercantile Jason, which was wrecked in 1821.
- HMS Volcano was to have been an 8-gun bomb vessel. She was ordered in 1819 and cancelled in 1831.
- HMS Volcano (1836) was a wooden paddle sloop launched in 1836. She became a floating factory in 1862 and was broken up in 1894.
- HMS Volcano was to have been a W-class destroyer. She was cancelled in 1918.
- HMS Volcano was a World War II land-based training establishment at Holmrook Hall, Cumbria, specialising in explosives
