= John David Chambers =

English barrister and legal and liturgical writer

John David Chambers, QC, FSA (1805–1893) was an English legal and liturgical writer.

== Early life ==
John David Chambers, eldest son of Captain David Chambers Esq., Royal Navy, of Harrow Weald, Middlesex, was born in London in 1805. He was educated at Oriel College, Oxford, graduating with honours in 1827 (MA 1831). He was called to the Bar by the Inner Temple in 1831. In 1842 he published an elaborate treatise on the Jurisdiction of the Court of Chancery over the persons and property of Infants (On the Equitable Jurisdiction of the Court of Chancery over Infants, Law and Practice of Elections), and was appointed Recorder of New Sarum (Salisbury) the same year.

== Liturgical studies ==
At Salisbury his attention was specially attracted to the Liturgical and other Ecclesiastical lore appertaining to the Cathedral, and to Saint Osmund, its Bishop from 1078 to 1099. Saint Osmund compiled from different sources a series of Divine Offices, and Rules for their celebration within his diocese. These Rules were in two parts, the Ordinale, and the Consuetudinary.

The use of these Rules became very extensive; and although in certain parts the Uses of York, Hereford, Bangor, and Lincoln varied, yet John Brompton, the Cistercian Abbot of Jervaulx, writing within a hundred years after Saint Osmund's death, says that these Rules and Offices had been adopted throughout England, Wales, and Ireland.

About 1230 (after the opening of the New Cathedral at Salisbury) these Rules were collected and rewritten in a complete volume, entitled Tractatus de Officiis Ecclesiasticus (MS. in the Cathedral Library). In the mean time the Ordinale had become partly welded into this Consuetudinary, and partly (especially that portion therein omitted from Maundy Thursday to Easter Eve) incorporated in the Breviary, Missal, and Processional, which had assumed definite shapes. From these materials, together with the aid of several manuscripts and early printed Breviaries, Chambers published a translation of:—

The Psalter, or Seven Ordinary Hours of Sarum, with the Hymns for the Tear, and the Variations of the York and Hereford Breviaries, London, 1852.

This was accompanied with a Preface, notes, and illustrations, together with music from a MS. folio Antiphonary or Breviary of the early part of the 14th century, (in the (Salisbury Cathedral Library) collated with a similar MS. folio, both of Sarum Use. The hymns with their melodies, and the Canticles, were also collated with a MS. of the 14th century.

== Personal life ==
Chambers married, on 7 August 1834, the Honourable Henrietta Laura, third daughter of John, 2nd Lord Wodehouse. He died in London on 22 August 1893 at the age of eighty-eight, having been Recorder of Salisbury for over fifty years.

== Works ==
Chambers's publications include:—

1. The Psalter, or Seven Ordinary Hours of Sarum, with the Hymns for the Tear, and the Variations of the York and Hereford Breviaries, London, 1852.
2. The Encheiridion; or, Book of Daily Devotion of the Ancient English Church according to Sarum Use. London, 1860. To this a number of the appropriate Hymns and Collects were added.
3. A Companion for Holy Communion for Clergy or Laity; with a Prefatory Office for Confession, from the Ancient English Offices of Sarum Use, 3rd ed. 1855. This was accompanied with notes and authorities.
4. Lauda Syon, Ancient Latin Hymns of the English and Other Churches, Translated into corresponding Metres, Part I. 1857; Part II. 1866.
5. An Order of Household Devotion for a Week, with Variations for the Seasons and Festivals, from the Ancient English of Sarum Use. London, 1854.
6. A Complete & Particular, yet concise account of the mode of conducting Divine Worship in England in the 13th and 14th centuries, contrasted with and adapted to that in use at the Present Time. London, 1877.
7. A translation from the original Greek of the genuine works of Hermes Trismegistus, the Christian Neoplatonist (AD 60), with notes and quotations from the Fathers.

== Appraisal ==
Chambers's publications and translations had no small part in stimulating the great change which took place in the mode of worship in the Church of England in the second half of the nineteenth century. According to John Julian, "His translations of Latin hymns are close, clear and poetical; they have much strength and earnestness, and the rhythm is easy and musical".

== See also ==
- Oxford Movement
- Anglo-Catholicism

== Sources ==
- Foster, Joseph, ed. (1885). "Chambers, John David". In Men-at-the-Bar. 2nd ed. London: Hazel, Watson and Viney, Ltd. p. 80.
- Julian, John, ed. (1907). "Chambers, John David". In A Dictionary of Hymnology. 2nd ed. Vol. 1. New York, NY: Dover Publications, Inc. pp. 216–217.
- The Bristol Mercury. 28 August 1893. p. 5.
- The Guardian. 30 August 1893. pp. 7, 10.
