= Paulina Irby =

British travel writer and suffragist (1831–1911)

- Born: Adeline Paulina Irby; 19 December 1831; Morningthorpe, England, United Kingdom
- Died: 15 September 1911 (aged 79); Sarajevo, Bosnia and Herzegovina, Austria-Hungary
- Resting place: Holy Archangels Cemetery, Sarajevo
- Known for: Campaigner for Christian rights in the Ottoman Empire
- Parent(s): Frederick Paul Irby; Frances Wright
- Relatives: Howard Irby (brother)
- Awards: Order of Saint Sava and Order of the Cross of Takovo

Adeline Paulina Irby (19 December 1831 – 15 September 1911) was a British travel writer and suffragist who founded an early girls' school in Sarajevo and organized relief to thousands of refugees. The centenary of her death was commemorated throughout the former Yugoslavia where she is often referred to simply as Miss Irby.

== Life ==
(Adeline) Paulina Irby was born in 1831. Her father's home was at Boyland Hall in Morningthorpe. Her parents were Rear-Admiral Frederick Paul Irby and Frances Wright. Her mother, her father's second wife, came from Mapperley Hall near Nottingham. Her brother Colonel Howard Irby was a noted ornithologist.

Irby set out with her Scottish companion Georgina Muir Mackenzie initially to visit spa towns in Austria-Hungary and Germany in 1857. In 1858 they were arrested as spies in Starý Smokovec, a spa town in the Carpathian Mountains, on the grounds that they had "pan-Slavistic tendencies". They did not stand trial, and neither of them were aware of the underlying issues, but they were both intrigued by the subject. They travelled in Albania and Serbia investigating the conditions and both became supporters of Serbia and the southern Slavs as they saw their conditions under the perceived poor government by the Ottoman rulers. They were particularly concerned by the plight of Serbian Orthodox women and girls who found they had poor access to positions and schooling. In 1862 they published Notes on the South Slavonic Countries in Austria and Turkey in Europe based on Mackenzie's lecture in Bath and Across the Carpathians but they did this anonymously.

Irby and Mackenzie established an organisation to gather funds and Irby was in regular correspondence with Florence Nightingale who encouraged and supported Irby, encouraging her to get her facts right so that Nightingale could get their case published in The Times. Irby and Nightingales had met at the Deaconess's Institute of Kaiserswerth.

Their requests for money were very successful and they opened a Christian school in Sarajevo staffed by German Protestant Deaconesses. Irby took the lead in managing this school in 1871 helped by Priscilla Johnson who herself came from a campaigning family. Irby was corresponding with her friend Florence Nightingale and Irby was considered as a companion for Nightingale's mother in 1875.

However, the Christian population went into revolt in the same year Irby closed the Sarajevo school. She followed the Bosnian Serbian refugees and distributed food to 3,000 people. By July 1876 she had returned to England and she reported on seven schools which they had organised. This was of especial interest given that the "Bulgarian Atrocities" and Lady Strangford was in the news. Irby was mentioned in Parliament and William Gladstone wrote an introduction to the second edition of her book. This book had been substantially expanded by Irby with four extra chapters on what is now Bosnia. By 1878 there were 21 schools educating 2,000 Christian children and supplying food and clothing in Dalmatia and Slavonia.

In 1879 Irby was able to re-open the school supporting Christian children in Sarajevo. The school was credited with educating the next generation of teachers. The Austrians were worried by Irby and her pro-Slav sympathies, but by 1907 she was given a letter of thanks signed by 200 Bosnian notable people. When Irby died in Sarajevo, leaving all her money to aid education in Bosnia, there was mourning in Belgrade as well as Sarajevo. 15,000 people irrespective of gender or faith were said to have paid their respects in a funeral that Bosnia "had never saw". Irby had been in correspondence with Florence Nightingale for many years and Nightingale kept copies of the letters but Irby requested that Nightingale's supportive, but occasionally critical, letters be destroyed after her death.

== Legacy ==
She was awarded Order of St. Sava and Order of the Cross of Takovo.

A street in Sarajevo Mis Irbina ulica is named in her honour. Similarly, a street in Belgrade, within the municipality of Zvezdara, Ulica Mis Irbijeve carries her name. The street was renamed to Ulica Zage Malivuk during the communist period, after the Yugoslav Communist Party (KPJ) activist and World War II Partisan Zagorka "Zaga" Malivuk. In 2004, the street's original name after Paulina Irby was reinstated.

For a number of years, an annual ceremony was held at her grave to mark the shot that initiated the First World War and there was belated commemorations of the centenary of her birth (in 1934) throughout Yugoslavia.
