= John Woodhouse =

John Woodhouse may refer to:

- John Woodhouse (bishop) (1884–1955), Anglican suffragan bishop
- John Woodhouse (British Army officer) (1922–2008), Special Air Service officer
- John Woodhouse (geophysicist), English geophysicist
- John Woodhouse (priest) (1749–1833), English Anglican priest
- John Woodhouse (Nonconformist minister) (c.1627–1700), English Presbyterian minister
- Jack Woodhouse (1888–1958), English footballer

== See also ==
- John Wodehouse (disambiguation)
- John Woodhouse Audubon (1812–1862), American painter
- John T. Woodhouse House, Grosse Pointe Farms, Michigan
