= Military sketching board =

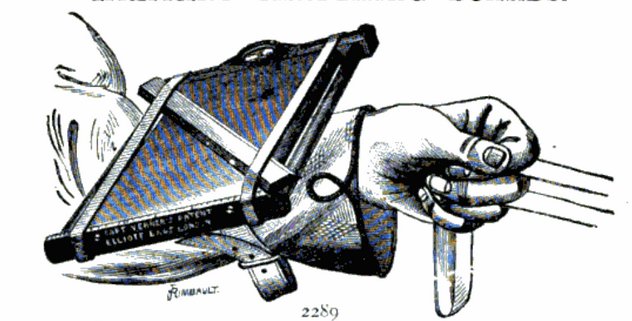
- Military sketching board
- Material: Wood, paper, leather and metal
- Created: 1880

The military sketching board was designed to be used on horseback. The board incorporates a compass, an inclinometer, a ruler, a roll of paper and an arm buckle.

== Description ==
The board was designed to be strapped to the arm of a cavalryman on the arm with which he held the horse's bridle. The board is attached to the leather buckle with a swivel joint. This means that the user can twist the whole board on their arm to ensure that the compass alignment is clear. The board incorporates a compass for this purpose. The user can then use the supplied ruler. In earlier versions this was attached with rubber bands but later versions had the ruler permanently attached. The paper was about two or three feet (0.61 or 0.91 m) long and was rolled around one of the side rollers. As a sketch was completed then the paper roll was advanced to supply more clear paper. On the back of the board is a fixed clinometer to allow the gradients of slopes to be recorded.

== History ==
The board was originally designed by Colonel William Hamilton Richards, Fifty-fifth Regiment of Foot, who taught military drawing and surveying at the Royal Military College Sandhurst as Instructor and later as Professor. (Note: On the title page of Military Surveying and Field Sketching (1875), Richards is listed as 'Major W.H. Richards, Fifty-fifth Regiment, Chief Instructor. Late Instructor of Military Surveying, Royal Military College, Sandhurst.' The title page of his later 1883 volume Text Book of Military Topography describes him as 'Colonel W.H. Richards, Professor of Military Topography, Staff College'. Richards was decorated for his service in the Crimean War with the 55th Foot. Entries in the London Gazette and in Hart's Annual Army Lists show him seconded as Instructor, Military Drawing & Surveying, at Sandhurst from 1863, then out in India in the mid 1870s with the 55th Foot as Chief Garrison Instructor, Lucknow, then from 1878 to 1881 back at the Staff College, Sandhurst, as Professor of Military Drawing & Surveying. He finally retired from the Army in 1888.)

The board was improved by Major (later Colonel) William Willoughby Cole Verner, Rifle Brigade, who had briefly been Professor of Topography at Sandhurst. He patented improvements in 1887 and 1891 and the board became known as Verner's (Note: In fact the Harrison & Sons advertisements in the cited 1905 India List separately list and picture both Verner's Wrist Plane Table (or Cavalry Field Sketching Board) and Col. Richard's Pattern Cavalry Field Sketching Board, so both names were still in use in 1905. Verner's version included a clinometer and a more advanced compass, but was also nearly 50% dearer - see References). Verner published his own guide to the sketching board in 1889. However the board was not universally loved and some referred to it as "The damnable cavalry sketching board".

In the 1930s very similar devices were used by solo aviators. The device was strapped to the arm or leg and was loaded with maps rather than sketching paper.

One of these devices is in the collection of the National Museums of Scotland.
