= John Wodehouse, 1st Earl of Kimberley =

British Liberal politician (1826–1902)

The Right Honourable The Earl of Kimberley KG KP PC DL
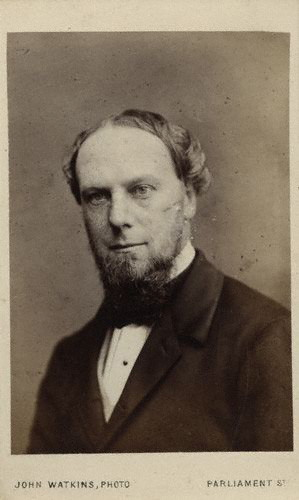
- Carte de visite showing the Earl of Kimberley, ca. 1868.

Secretary of State for Foreign Affairs
- In office 10 March 1894 – 21 June 1895
- Monarch: Victoria
- Prime Minister: The Earl of Rosebery
- Preceded by: The Earl of Rosebery
- Succeeded by: The Marquess of Salisbury

Leader of the House of Lords Lord President of the Council
- In office 18 August 1892 – 5 March 1894
- Monarch: Victoria
- Prime Minister: William Ewart Gladstone
- Preceded by: The Marquess of Salisbury (Leader of the House of Lords); The Earl of Cranbrook (Lord President of the Council)
- Succeeded by: The Earl of Rosebery

Secretary of State for India
- In office 18 August 1892 – 10 March 1894
- Monarch: Victoria
- Prime Minister: William Ewart Gladstone
- Preceded by: The Viscount Cross
- Succeeded by: Henry Fowler
- In office 6 February 1886 – 20 July 1886
- Monarch: Victoria
- Prime Minister: William Ewart Gladstone
- Preceded by: Lord Randolph Churchill
- Succeeded by: The Viscount Cross
- In office 16 December 1882 – 9 June 1885
- Monarch: Victoria
- Prime Minister: William Ewart Gladstone
- Preceded by: Marquess of Hartington
- Succeeded by: Lord Randolph Churchill

Chancellor of the Duchy of Lancaster
- In office 25 July 1882 – 28 December 1882
- Monarch: Victoria
- Prime Minister: William Ewart Gladstone
- Preceded by: John Bright
- Succeeded by: John George Dodson

Secretary of State for the Colonies
- In office 21 April 1880 – 16 December 1882
- Monarch: Victoria
- Prime Minister: William Ewart Gladstone
- Preceded by: Sir Michael Hicks Beach, Bt.
- Succeeded by: The Earl of Derby
- In office 6 July 1870 – 17 February 1874
- Monarch: Victoria
- Prime Minister: William Ewart Gladstone
- Preceded by: The Earl Granville
- Succeeded by: The Earl of Carnarvon

Lord Keeper of the Privy Seal
- In office 9 December 1868 – 6 July 1870
- Monarch: Victoria
- Prime Minister: William Ewart Gladstone
- Preceded by: The Earl of Malmesbury
- Succeeded by: The Viscount Halifax

Lord Lieutenant of Ireland
- In office 1 November 1864 – 13 July 1866
- Monarch: Victoria
- Prime Minister: The Viscount Palmerston; The Earl Russell
- Preceded by: The Earl of Carlisle
- Succeeded by: The Marquess of Abercorn
Junior ministerial positions
Parliamentary Under-Secretary of State for India
In office 25 April 1864 – 16 November 1864
Monarch	Victoria
Prime Minister	The Viscount Palmerston
Preceded by	Hon. Thomas Baring
Succeeded by	Lord Dufferin and Clandeboye
Parliamentary Under-Secretary of State for Foreign Affairs
In office 19 June 1859 – 15 August 1861
Monarch	Victoria
Prime Minister	The Viscount Palmerston
Preceded by	William Vesey-FitzGerald
Succeeded by	Austen Henry Layard
In office 28 December 1852 – 5 July 1856
Monarch	Victoria
Prime Minister	The Earl of Aberdeen; The Viscount Palmerston
Preceded by	Lord Stanley
Succeeded by	Earl of Shelburne

Member of the House of Lords Lord Temporal
- In office 8 January 1847 – 8 April 1902; Hereditary Peerage
- Preceded by: The 2nd Lord Wodehouse
- Succeeded by: The 2nd Earl of Kimberley

Personal details
- Born: 7 January 1826 Wymondham
- Died: 8 April 1902 (aged 76) London
- Party: Liberal Party
- Spouse(s): Lady Florence FitzGibbon (d. 1895)
- Children: 3, including John and Armine
- Education: Christ Church, Oxford

John Wodehouse, 1st Earl of Kimberley KG KP PC DL (7 January 1826 – 8 April 1902), known as the Lord Wodehouse from 1846 to 1866, was a British Liberal politician. He held office in every Liberal administration from 1852 to 1895, notably as Secretary of State for the Colonies and as Foreign Secretary.

== Early life and education ==
Kimberley was born in 1826 in Wymondham, Norfolk, the eldest son of the Hon. Henry Wodehouse (1799–1834) and grandson of John Wodehouse, 2nd Baron Wodehouse. His mother was Anne Gurdon (d. 1880), daughter of Theophilus Thornhagh Gurdon. In 1846 he succeeded his grandfather as third Baron Wodehouse. He was educated at Eton and Christ Church, Oxford, where he took a first-class degree in classics in 1847.

== Early career (1852–1874) ==
He was by inheritance a Liberal in politics, and in 1852–1856 and 1859–1861 he was Parliamentary Under-Secretary of State for Foreign Affairs in Lord Aberdeen's and Lord Palmerston's ministries. In the interval (1856–1858) he had been envoy-extraordinary to Russia; and in 1863 he was sent on a special mission to Copenhagen in the hope of finding a solution to the Schleswig-Holstein question. However, the mission was a failure.

In 1864 Kimberley became Under-Secretary of State for India, but towards the end of the year was made Lord Lieutenant of Ireland. In that capacity, he had to grapple with the first manifestations of Fenianism, and in recognition of his services, he was created Earl of Kimberley in 1866. In July 1866 he vacated his office with the fall of Lord Russell's ministry, but in 1868 he became Lord Privy Seal in Gladstone's cabinet, and in July 1870 was transferred from that post to be Secretary of State for the Colonies. It was the moment of the great diamond discoveries in southern Africa, and the town of Kimberley in the Cape Colony was named after him. Lord Kimberley was credited with the change in British policy towards the independent Malay states that led to the signing of the Pangkor Treaty of 1874, after which British political agents known as Residents were placed in the Malay states as advisors to the rulers.

== Later career (1875–1902) ==
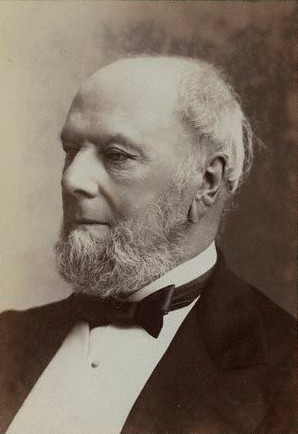
Lord Kimberley, c. 1897

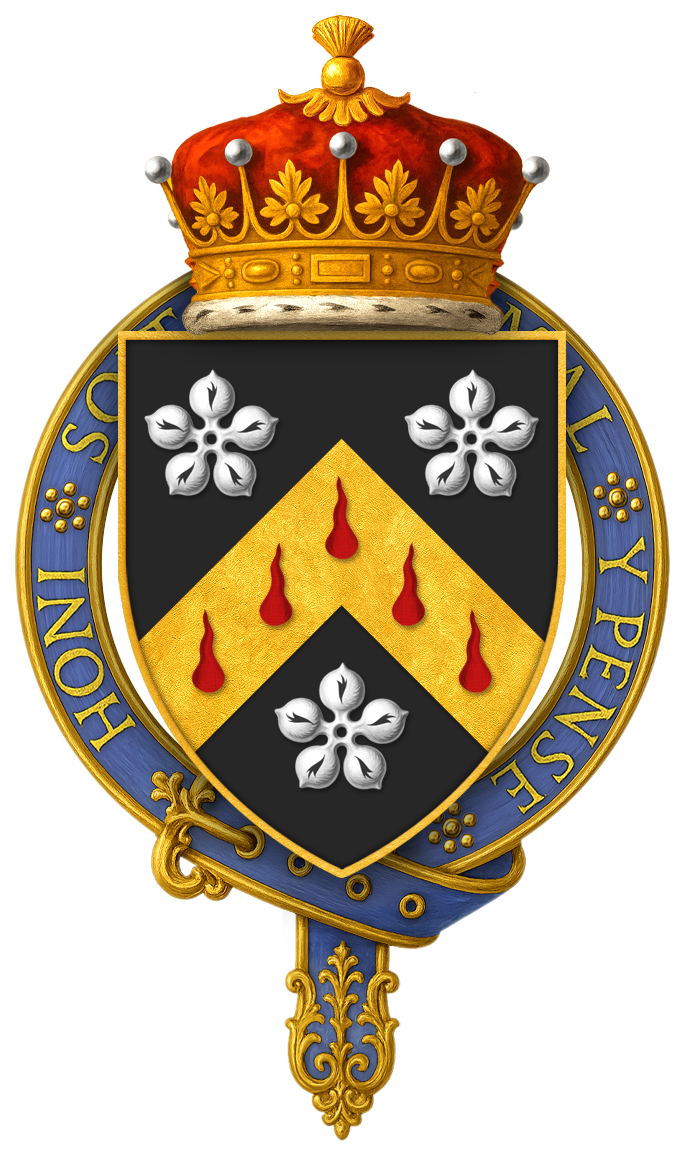
Garter-encircled arms of John Wodehouse, 1st Earl of Kimberley, KG, PC, DL

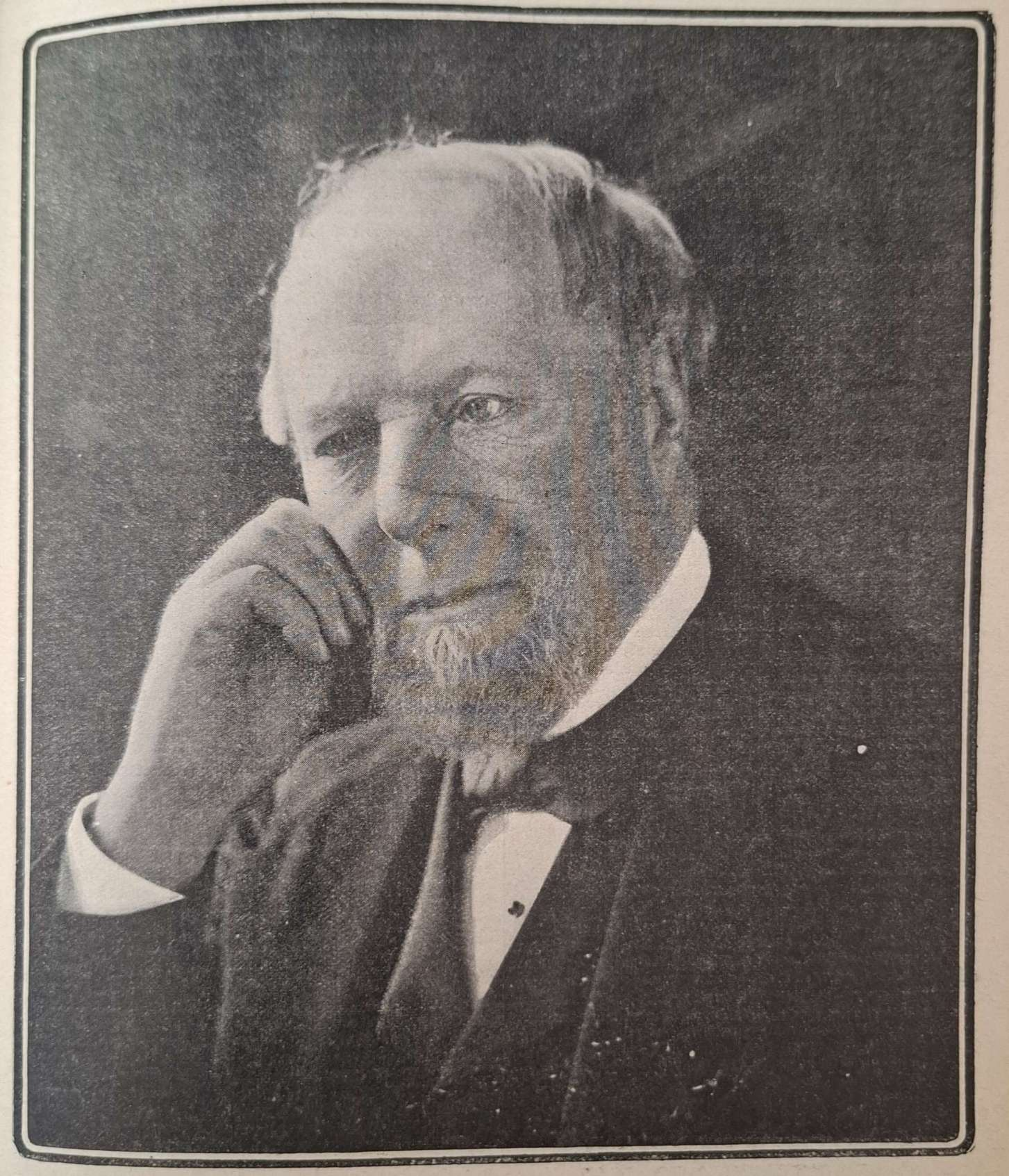
Photo of John Wodehouse as seen in the Black and White Budget, 16 March 1901.

After an interval in opposition from 1874 to 1880, Lord Kimberley returned to the Colonial Office in Gladstone's next ministry. He was in that office when responsible government was granted to Cape Colony, British Columbia was added to the Dominion of Canada and during the First Boer War. At the end of 1882 he exchanged this office first for that of Chancellor of the Duchy of Lancaster and then for the secretaryship of state for India, a post he retained during the remainder of Gladstone's tenure of power (1882–1885, 1886, 1892–1894), though in 1892–1894 he combined with it that of the lord presidency of the council.

In Lord Rosebery's cabinet (1894–1895) he was Foreign Secretary. During this time he signed the landmark Anglo-Japanese Treaty of Commerce and Navigation. Sir Edward Grey who served as Parliamentary Under-Secretary under Kimberley at the Foreign Office portrays him unfavourably as prolix and prone to irrelevant digressions in conversation although concise, definite and clear on paper. However, according to the Encyclopædia Britannica Eleventh Edition, "As leader of the Liberal party in the House of Lords he acted with undeviating dignity, and in opposition, he was a courteous antagonist and a critic of weight and experience".

== Other public positions ==
On 5 April 1850, he joined the Canterbury Association, formed to establish a colony (in the later Canterbury Region) on the South Island of New Zealand.

Lord Kimberley took interest in education, and after being for many years a member of the senate of the University of London, he became its chancellor in 1899.

== Family ==
Lord Kimberley married Lady Florence FitzGibbon (d. 1895), daughter of Richard FitzGibbon, 3rd Earl of Clare, on 16 August 1847. They had three children:

- John Wodehouse, 2nd Earl of Kimberley (10 Dec 1848 – 7 Jan 1932)
- Lady Alice Wodehouse (17 Dec 1850 – 8 Jan 1937) married Hussey Packe, son of George Hussey Packe, on 14 August 1872. They had two children, Sir Edward, and Florence, the wife of Lt.-Col. Cuthbert James.
- Hon. Armine Wodehouse (24 Sep 1860 – 1 May 1901)

He died at 35 Lowndes Square in London (now the High Commission of Pakistan) on 8 April 1902, aged 76, and was succeeded in his titles by his eldest son, John. His more distant relatives include the writer P. G. Wodehouse.

== Ancestry ==
Ancestors of John Wodehouse, 1st Earl of Kimberley

8. Rt. Hon. John Wodehouse, 1st Baron Wodehouse of Kimberley
4. Rt. Hon. John Wodehouse, 2nd Baron Wodehouse of Kimberley
9. Sophia Berkeley
2. Hon. Henry Wodehouse
10. John Norris
5. Charlotte Laura Norris
11. Charlotte Townsheand
1. Rt. Hon. John Wodehouse, first Earl of Kimberley
12. Brampton Gurdon
6. Theophilus Thornhaugh Gurdon
13. Mary Bedingfield
3. Anne Gurdon
14. William Mellish
7. Anne Mellish
15. Anne Gore

== Memorials ==
The following places were named after the 1st Earl of Kimberley:

- the Kimberley region of Western Australia;
- Kimberley, a town in South Africa and;
- Kimberley, New Zealand, a hamlet of in the Selwyn District.
- Kimberley Road and Kimberley Street in Hong Kong
- Kimberley Street, George Town, Penang, Malaysia
- Kimberley Park, Falmouth, Cornwall
- County of Kimberley, a cadastral unit in South Australia.

== Notes ==
Political offices
Preceded by Lord Stanley	Under-Secretary of State for Foreign Affairs; 1852–1856	Succeeded by The Earl of Shelburne
Preceded by William Vesey-FitzGerald	Under-Secretary of State for Foreign Affairs; 1859–1861	Succeeded by Austen Henry Layard
Preceded by Hon. Thomas Baring	Under-Secretary of State for India; 1864	Succeeded by The Lord Dufferin and Claneboye
Preceded by The Earl of Carlisle	Lord Lieutenant of Ireland; 1864–1866	Succeeded by The Marquess of Abercorn
Preceded by The Earl of Malmesbury	Lord Privy Seal; 1868–1870	Succeeded by The Viscount Halifax
Preceded by The Earl Granville	Colonial Secretary; 1870–1874	Succeeded by The Earl of Carnarvon
Preceded by Sir Michael Hicks-Beach, Bt	Colonial Secretary; 1880–1882	Succeeded by The Earl of Derby
Preceded by John Bright	Chancellor of the Duchy of Lancaster; 1882	Succeeded by John George Dodson
Preceded by Marquess of Hartington	Secretary of State for India; 1882–1885	Succeeded by Lord Randolph Churchill
Preceded by Lord Randolph Churchill	Secretary of State for India; 1886	Succeeded by The Viscount Cross
Preceded by The Viscount Cross	Secretary of State for India; 1892–1894	Succeeded by Henry Fowler
Preceded by The Viscount Cranbrook	Lord President of the Council; 1892–1894	Succeeded by The Earl of Rosebery
Preceded by The Earl of Rosebery	Foreign Secretary; 1894–1895	Succeeded by The Marquess of Salisbury
Party political offices
Preceded by The Earl Granville	Leader of the Liberals in the House of Lords; 1891–1894	Succeeded by The Earl of Rosebery
Preceded by The Earl of Rosebery	Leader of the Liberals in the House of Lords; 1897–1902	Succeeded by The Earl Spencer
Preceded by The Earl of Rosebery	Leader of the British Liberal Party; 1897–1902 with William Vernon Harcourt 1897–1898; Sir Henry Campbell-Bannerman 1899–1902	Succeeded by Sir Henry Campbell-Bannerman; The Earl Spencer
Academic offices
Preceded by The Lord Herschell	Chancellor of the University of London; 1899–1902	Succeeded by The Earl of Rosebery
Peerage of the United Kingdom
New creation	Earl of Kimberley; 1866–1902	Succeeded by John Wodehouse
Peerage of Great Britain
Preceded by John Wodehouse	Baron Wodehouse; 1846–1902	Succeeded by John Wodehouse
Baronetage of England
Preceded by John Wodehouse	Baronet of Wilberhall; 1846–1902	Succeeded by John Wodehouse
