= Morningthorpe =

Village in Norfolk, England

Coordinates: 52.486°N 1.265°E

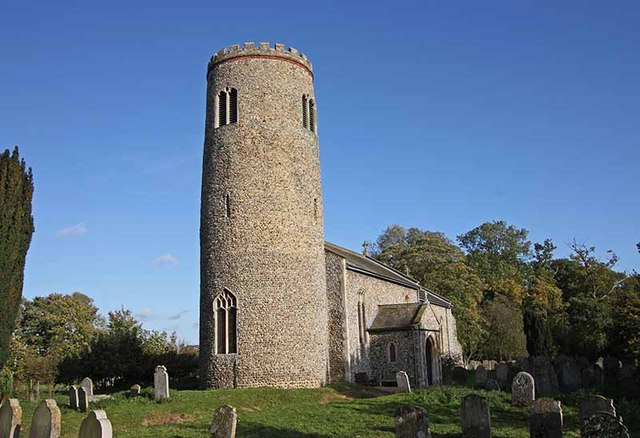
- St John the Baptist, Morningthorpe

- Location within Norfolk
- Area: 7.74 km^{2} (2.99 sq mi)
- Population: 267 (2011)
  - Density: 34/km^{2} (88/sq mi)
- OS grid reference: TM 217 925
- Civil parish: Morningthorpe and Fritton
- District: South Norfolk
- Shire county: Norfolk
- Region: East
- Country: England
- Sovereign state: United Kingdom
- Post town: NORWICH
- Postcode district: NR15
- Dialling code: 01508
- Police: Norfolk
- Fire: Norfolk
- Ambulance: East of England

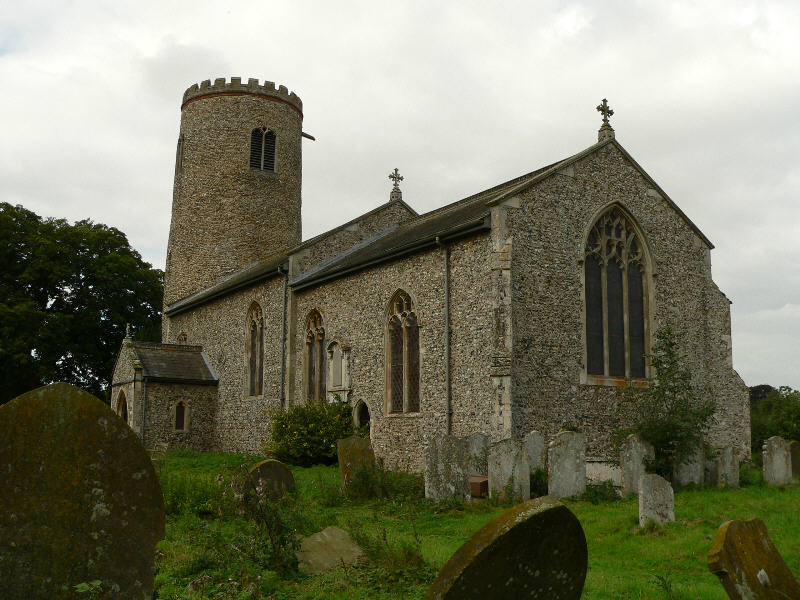
Morningthorpe St John the Baptist

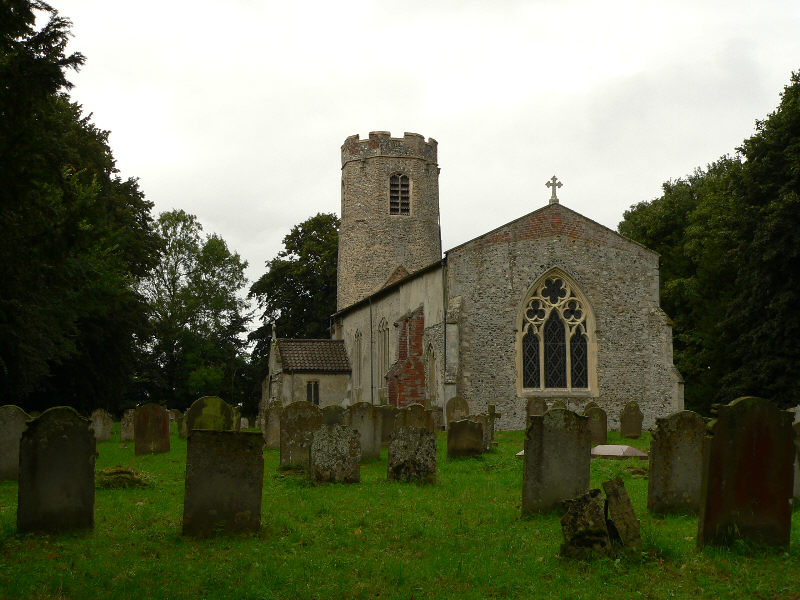
Fritton St Catherine

Morningthorpe (sometimes Morning Thorpe) is a village and former civil parish, now in the parish of Morningthorpe and Fritton in the South Norfolk district, in the county of Norfolk, England. It is situated some 20 kilometres (12 mi) south of the city of Norwich. The parish includes the villages of Morningthorpe and Fritton. The two villages are 1 km apart (about half a mile)

The village's name origin is uncertain perhaps, 'outlying farm/settlement of the pool dwellers', 'outlying farm/settlement of the boundary dwellers' or 'outlying farm/settlement of Maera's people'.

The civil parish has an area of 7.74 square kilometres (2.99 sq mi) and in the 2001 census had a population of 253 in 94 households the population increasing to 267 at the 2011 Census.

The churches of Morningthorpe St John the Baptist and Fritton St Catherine are two of 124 existing round-tower churches in Norfolk.

The village was struck by an F1/T2 tornado on 23 November 1981, as part of the record-breaking nationwide tornado outbreak on that day.

== Morningthorpe round tower ==
Morningthorpe has a round tower rather larger than that at neighbouring Long Stratton: the tower appears to bulge out about halfway up, which, according to the article in Round Tower magazine September 2004, may be evidence of an octagonal tower built inside a round one. The article has photographs of repair work done to the tower in 1988 - one shows a corner of an "octagon" inner tower core, not bonded to the outside, while another suggests a bonded, and rounded, core. There are narrow openings in the tower with monolithic heads in worn pale stone, the openings filled with old-looking wooden boards pierced with vertical rows of round holes. Taylor & Taylor, Anglo-Saxon Architecture seek to assign this tower to the later Saxon period (or earlier Norman).

== Civil parish ==
On 1 April 1935, the parish of Fritton was merged with Morning Thorpe. The new parish was renamed from "Morning Thorpe" to "Morningthorpe and Fritton" on 1 May 2012. In 1931 the parish of Morning Thorpe (prior to the merge) had a population of 110.

== Notable people ==
The ornithologist Howard Irby was born here in 1833 at Boyland Hall. The hall was demolished in 1947.

Paulina Irby, the campaigner for Bosnian Serb refugees was born here in 1831.

British racing driver St. John Horsfall was born here in 1910.

The author Joseph Dickerson was born here in 1943.

Tommy Hicks – later the entertainer Tommy Steele, and his family, were evacuated here from London during World War Two.
