= George Simmonds =

Australian rules footballer

Personal information
- Full name: George Leslie Simmonds
- Born: 16 July 1895; Bendigo, Victoria
- Died: 15 January 1973 (aged 77); Kerang, Victoria
- Original team: Kerang
- Height: 177 cm (5 ft 10 in)
- Weight: 76 kg (168 lb)
- Position: Forward

Playing career^{1}
Years	Club	Games (Goals)
1924	Melbourne	4 (4)
- ^{1} Playing statistics correct to the end of 1924.

George Leslie Simmonds (16 July 1895 – 15 January 1973) was an Australian rules footballer who played with Melbourne in the Victorian Football League (VFL).
