= John Wodehouse, 5th Earl of Kimberley =

British chemist & peer (born 1951)

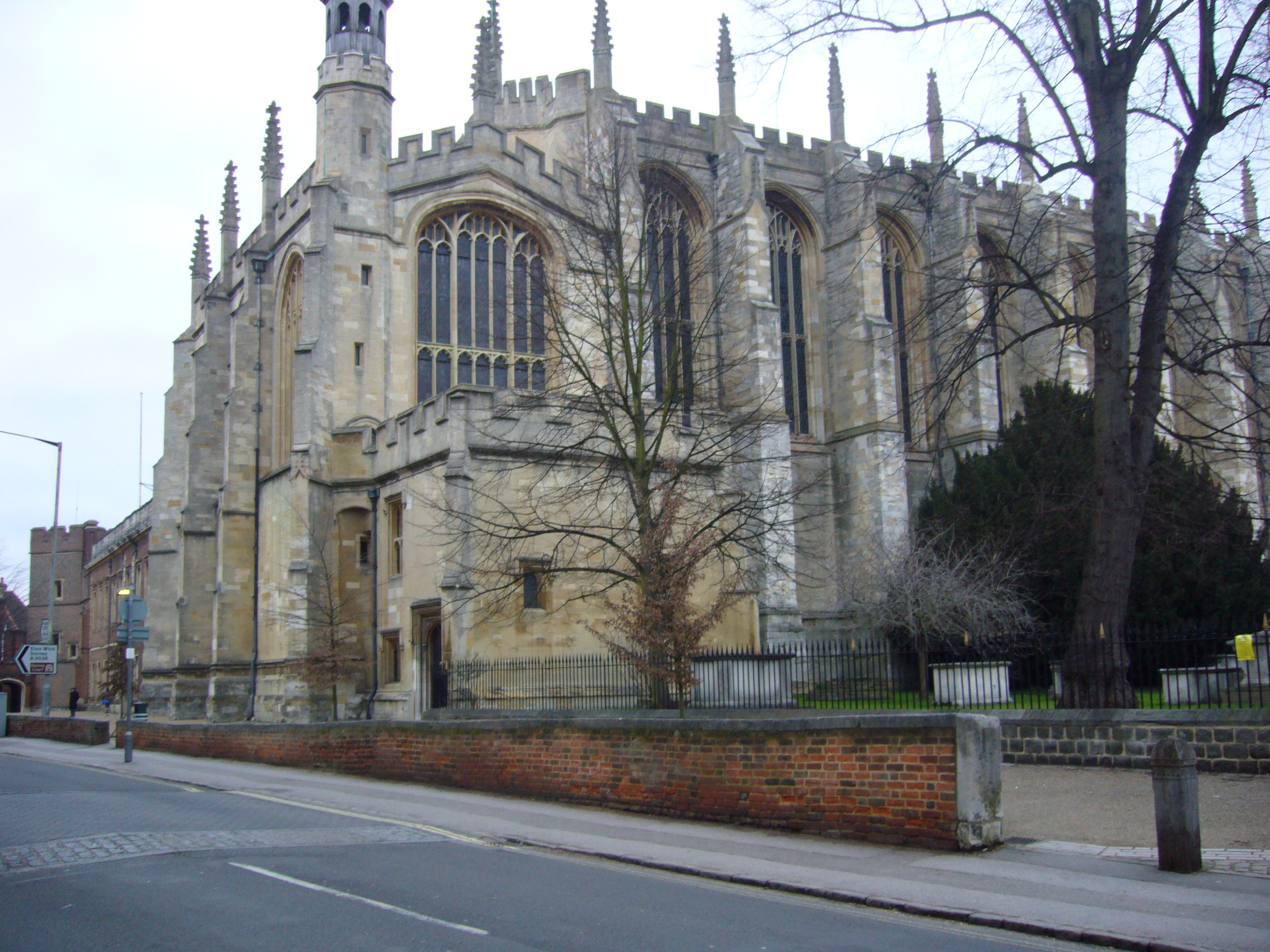
Eton College

John Armine Wodehouse, 5th Earl of Kimberley FRSA (born 15 January 1951), is a British chemist and peer.

== Early life ==
The eldest of four sons of John Wodehouse, 4th Earl of Kimberley, but his only child with his second wife, Carmel Maguire, daughter of Mickey Maguire, welterweight champion of Australia, he was educated at Eton College and the University of East Anglia, where he graduated with Bachelor of Science and Master of Science degrees.

Kimberley's middle name, Armine, recalls his ancestor Sir Armine Wodehouse, 5th Baronet, from whom the writer P. G. Wodehouse was also descended.

== Career ==
Kimberley is a chemist and worked for GlaxoSmithKline from 1974 until he retired in 2012. He is also a computer systems programmer, a Fellow of the British Interplanetary Society, a member of the British Computer Society, and a Fellow of the Royal Society of Arts.

He succeeded his father to the peerages in 2002. In 2008, he was licensed as a lay reader in the Church of England.

== Personal life ==
In 1973, Kimberley married the Hon. Carol Palmer, daughter of Raymond Palmer, 3rd Baron Palmer. They have two children: Lady Katherine Frances Wodehouse and David Simon John Wodehouse, Lord Wodehouse (born 1978), heir apparent to the peerages.

Lady Kimberley is a priest in the Church of England. She was made a canon at St Alban's Abbey in 2010 and is the first and only "Revd Canon Countess" in British history.

Peerage of the United Kingdom
Preceded by John Wodehouse	Earl of Kimberley; 2002–present	Incumbent; Heir apparent: David Wodehouse, Lord Wodehouse
Peerage of Great Britain
Preceded by John Wodehouse	Baron Wodehouse; 2002–present	Incumbent; Heir apparent: David Wodehouse, Lord Wodehouse
Baronetage of England
Preceded by John Wodehouse	Wodehouse baronets 2002–present	Incumbent; Heir apparent: David Wodehouse, Lord Wodehouse
