= Devil's Tower Cave =

Cave and archaeological site in Gibraltar

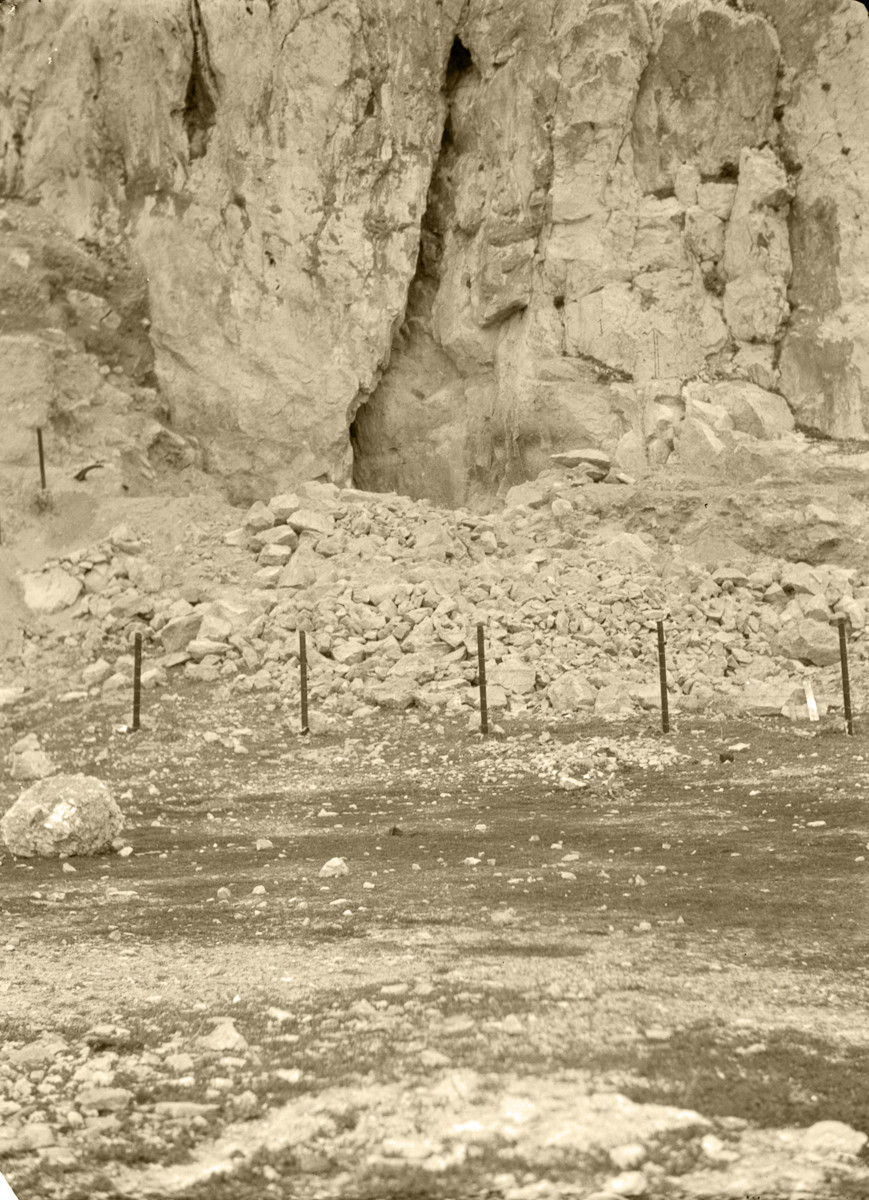
- the entrance in 1926
- Interactive map of Devil's Tower Cave
- Location: Rock of Gibraltar, Gibraltar
- Coordinates: 36.145249°N 5.342454°W
- Geology: Limestone
- Access: by request

Devil's Tower Cave is a cave in the British Overseas Territory of Gibraltar. Archaeologist Dorothy Garrod found a Neanderthal skull in the cave which, together with other evidence found in this cave, shows it was used as a rock shelter by the Neanderthals of Gibraltar.

== Geography ==
Gibraltar is sometimes referred to as the "Hill of Caves" and the geological formation of all the caves is limestone. Devil's Tower Cave is a very narrow fissure which was used by Neanderthals as a rock shelter. It has a maximum height of just over ten metres and is only around a meter wide heading into the cliff face for approximately four meters. The cave floor is nine meters above present sea level on a rocky outcrop. The cave was discovered by Col. William Willoughby Cole Verner, an English ornithologist who had retired in Algeciras in 1911, and the famous French prehistorian L’Abbe Breuil. Brueil and Verner had worked together before. They realised the importance of the site's breccias but didn't have time to excavate the site.

On 28 April 1917 they returned to the site for a closer inspection and found various Neanderthal stone tools and animal remains. This visit was also cut short as a military police officer saw them clambering up the cliff face and told them they could not do this and had to "keep to the road". On 10 April 1919 they yet again returned to the site, this time with a pass given to them by the then Governor. They eagerly explored the talus and were able to find some more remains including over a dozen flint tools and they described the area as having several beddings of rock falls and breccias. From these discoveries and the fact that Devil's Tower Cave was so close to Forbes' Quarry Cave, where Gibraltar 1, the famous Neanderthal skull, had been found a few years earlier in 1848, they deduced that the cave site had been used by "Prehistoric Man" and that the remains of animal bones and shells were the leftovers of their food. It was clear to them that they had also been cooking these animals, since pieces of burnt bone and charcoal were also found.

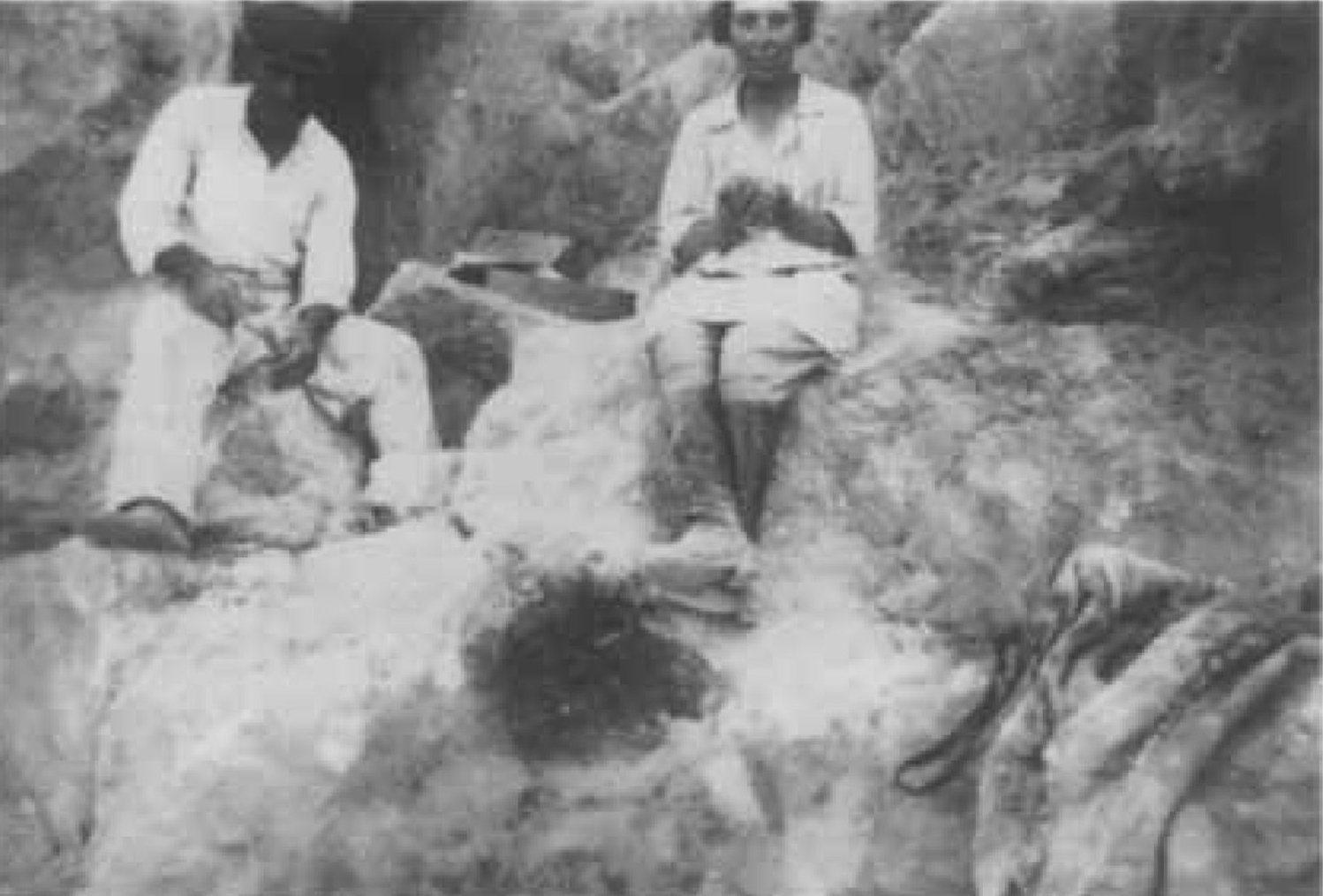
Dorothy Garrod and fragments of skull found at Devil's Tower Cave

Between November 1925 and January 1927, the site was further investigated by Dorothy Garrod from Cambridge University at the suggestion of L’Abbe Breuil. She excavated the site intensively and succeeded in discovering another very important find, a Neanderthal Skull, now referred to as Gibraltar 2. It is now known that this skull belonged to a Neanderthal child of around four years of age.

In 2018 the status of the Devil's Tower cave was confirmed in the Government of Gibraltar's Heritage and Antiquities Act. The act noted that it was a Mousterian shelter and the site of the discovery of a Neanderthal skull.
