= George Simmons (British Army officer) =

British Army officer

George Simmons (2 May 1785 – 5 March 1858) was a British Army officer who served in the Napoleonic Wars and was wounded at the Battle of Waterloo while serving with the 95th Regiment of Foot (Rifles).

== Life and career ==
Simmons was born in Beverley, Yorkshire one of nine sons and three daughters. He at first studied medicine but in 1805 was given a commission as an assistant surgeon in the Royal South Lincolnshire Militia as the threat from Napoleon increased. After four years service he transferred to the 1st Battalion of the 95th Rifles as a second-lieutenant since the normal lowest rank of ensign did not exist in the Rifles at that time. He was subsequently promoted to first-lieutenant on 25 July 1811; to captain on 17 April 1828 and to major on 16 February 1838.

=== Peninsular War ===
Wounded at the Combat of the Côa in 1810, he was present at subsequent Combat at Pombal (1811), Fuentes de Oñoro (1811), Ciudad Rodrigo (1812). Badajoz (1812), Salamanca (1812), Vitoria (1813), Pyrenees (1813), Nivelle (1813), Orthes (1814) and Tarbes where he was once again severely wounded.

=== Waterloo Campaign ===
The 1st/95th were engaged at the Battle of Quatre Bras on 16 June 1815, ″Until dark we had very sharp fighting″. Simmons spent the night before Waterloo sleeping on the muddy ground on a bundle of straw, sheltering from the rain under a mud-smeared blanket. During the subsequent battle he was shot through the liver, had two ribs broken and took a bullet in the chest. His watch stopped at 4 pm, the time that he was hit.
He was evacuated to Brussels where he remained convalescing for several weeks. In October he was well enough to travel back to England. He was sufficiently recovered from his severe wounds to rejoin his regiment on 1 January 1816, and served with the British army of occupation in France for nearly three years, returning to England with the 1st Battalion in November 1818.
Simmons subsequently served at home until July 1825 when he accompanied the battalion to Nova Scotia. On 17 April 1828 he was promoted to Captain, at which time he had close to nineteen years' service.

Apart from being awarded the Waterloo Medal, for his service in the Peninsular Campaigns Simmons received the Military General Service Medal with eight clasps.

He retired from the army in 1845, a Battalion Major, after thirty-six years' service, and died in St. Helier, Jersey on 5 March 1858. There is a memorial tablet in the town's St. Saviors Church erected by his widow and he is named on the Rifle Brigade Memorial in Winchester Cathedral.

== Works ==
Soldier and author Willoughby Verner edited letters that Simmons wrote home during his service in the Peninsular and Waterloo Campaign to produce the 1899 work A British Rifle Man: The Journals and Correspondence of Major George Simmons, Rifle Brigade, During the Peninsular War and the Campaign of Waterloo.

== Family ==
Simmons married Anne Corbet, eldest daughter of Sir Thomas Le Breton of Bagatelle. The couple had three children, George, Anne Corbet and Francis Eliza.
