= John Wodehouse, 3rd Earl of Kimberley =

British politician

The Right Honourable The Earl of Kimberley CBE MC JP
- John Wodehouse in 1920

Member of Parliament for Mid Norfolk
- In office 1906–1910
- Preceded by: Frederick Wilson
- Succeeded by: William Boyle

Member of the House of Lords
- Lord Temporal
- In office 7 January 1932 – 16 April 1941
- Preceded by: The 2nd Earl of Kimberley
- Succeeded by: The 4th Earl of Kimberley

Personal details
- Born: 11 November 1883
- Died: 16 April 1941 (aged 57) Westminster, London, England
- Spouse: Frances Margaret Montagu
- Children: John Wodehouse, 4th Earl of Kimberley
- Parent: John Wodehouse, 2nd Earl of Kimberley (father)
- Education: Trinity Hall, Cambridge
- Sports career
- Sport: Polo
Medal record
Polo
Representing Great Britain
Olympic Games
Silver medal – second place	1908 London	Polo
Gold medal – first place	1920 Antwerp	Polo
- Military career
- Allegiance: United Kingdom
- Branch: British Army
- Service years: 1911–1933
- Rank: Captain
- Conflicts: First World War
- Awards: Military Cross; War Merit Cross (Italy)

John Wodehouse, 3rd Earl of Kimberley, CBE, MC, JP (11 November 1883 – 16 April 1941), styled Lord Wodehouse from 1902 to 1932, was a British hereditary peer and Liberal politician. He was a champion polo player.

== Background ==
Wodehouse was the eldest son of John Wodehouse, 2nd Earl of Kimberley. He attended Eton College and Trinity Hall, Cambridge. At Cambridge, he was a committee member of the University Pitt Club. He started playing polo at university, where he was a member of the Light Blue team. He later played for the Old Cantabs team.

He holds the unique distinction of being the only person to win a gold medal at the Olympics in 1920 and a silver medal in 1908, both for polo.

== Political career and military service ==
Wodehouse was elected Member of Parliament for Mid Norfolk at the general election of 1906. Aged 22 years and 2 months, he was the youngest Liberal candidate at that election. Throughout his service, he was Baby of the House of Commons. In the former year, he became JP for the county of Norfolk. He sat in Parliament until the January 1910 general election.

Lord Wodehouse was commissioned a lieutenant in the Norfolk Yeomanry in 1911 and served with them until the beginning of the First World War in 1914. He served as a captain in the 16th Lancers during the war, when he was wounded and twice mentioned in despatches. He was at the Western Front in France from 1914 to 1917, and on the Italian Front during 1917–18. He won the MC in the latter year and also received the Italian War Merit Cross. His younger brother, Edward, also served in the 16th Lancers, but was killed in 1918. Another brother, Philip, died serving in 1919.

From outside Parliament, he served as unpaid assistant private secretary to the Colonial Secretary, then Winston Churchill, in 1921–22, and was awarded the CBE in the 1925 Birthday Honours. From 1921 to 1933 he remained on the Reserve of Officers.

He succeeded to his father's peerages in 1932, giving him a seat in the House of Lords.

== Family ==
Lord Kimberley married the twice-divorced Frances Margaret Montagu, daughter of Leonard Howard Loyd Irby, on 5 May 1922.

In April 1941, aged 57, he was killed in The Blitz at 48 Jermyn Street, Westminster, London, and was succeeded by his only child, John.

Kimberley's son John was the godson of the writer P. G. Wodehouse, a distant cousin, both being descended from Sir Armine Wodehouse, 5th Baronet. According to Brewer's Dictionary of Phrase and Fable, P. G. Wodehouse based the character of Bertie Wooster on him.

Parliament of the United Kingdom
Preceded by Frederick Wilson	Member of Parliament for Mid Norfolk; 1906 – January 1910	Succeeded by William Boyle
Peerage of the United Kingdom
Preceded by John Wodehouse	Earl of Kimberley; 1932–1941	Succeeded by John Wodehouse
Peerage of Great Britain
Preceded by John Wodehouse	Baron Wodehouse; 1932–1941	Succeeded by John Wodehouse
Baronetage of England
Preceded by John Wodehouse	Baronet of Wilberhall; 1932–1941	Succeeded by John Wodehouse
