= Howard Irby =

Leonard Howard Loyd Irby
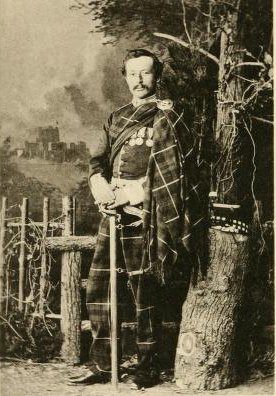
- Col. Irby
- Born: 13 April 1836; Morningthorpe
- Died: 14 May 1905 (aged 69); Regent's Park
- Education: Rugby
- Spouses: Geraldine Alicia Mary Magenis (m. 1864; died 1882) Mary Brandling (m. 1884)
- Children: 3, including Margaret
- Parent(s): Frederick Paul Irby; Frances Wright
- Relatives: Paulina Irby (sister)

Leonard Howard Loyd Irby (13 April 1836 – 14 May 1905) was a British ornithologist and army officer. He specialised in the study of birds in southern Iberia.

== Life ==
Irby was born in 1836 at Boyland Hall in Morningthorpe to Rear-Admiral Frederick Paul Irby and Frances (born Wright). His elder sister Paulina Irby was to become a Balkan heroine.

Irby was educated at Rugby and joined the 90th Light Infantry on May 5, 1854 and he left as an Ensign to be part of the Siege of Sevastopol. Here he fought but also collected the skins of the local birds. He received a Turkish medal and clasp and was promoted captain by 1857 and he and his company were sent to China but the H.M. Troopship Transit was shipwrecked near Sumatra. This was the year of the Indian Rebellion so Irby was redirected to Calcutta. He and his company marched 700 miles to assist in the aftermath of the massacres that had occurred at Cawnpore. He was present at both the relief, siege and fall of Lucknow serving with Sir James Outram, 1st Baronet. He was known as a very good shot and for his ability to find birds to shoot and eat. More importantly his diary became devoted to his observations of birds.

Irby moved regiments to the 74th Highlanders and was sent to Gibraltar in 1868 where his enthusiasm for ornithology matured under the guidance of Lord Lilford.

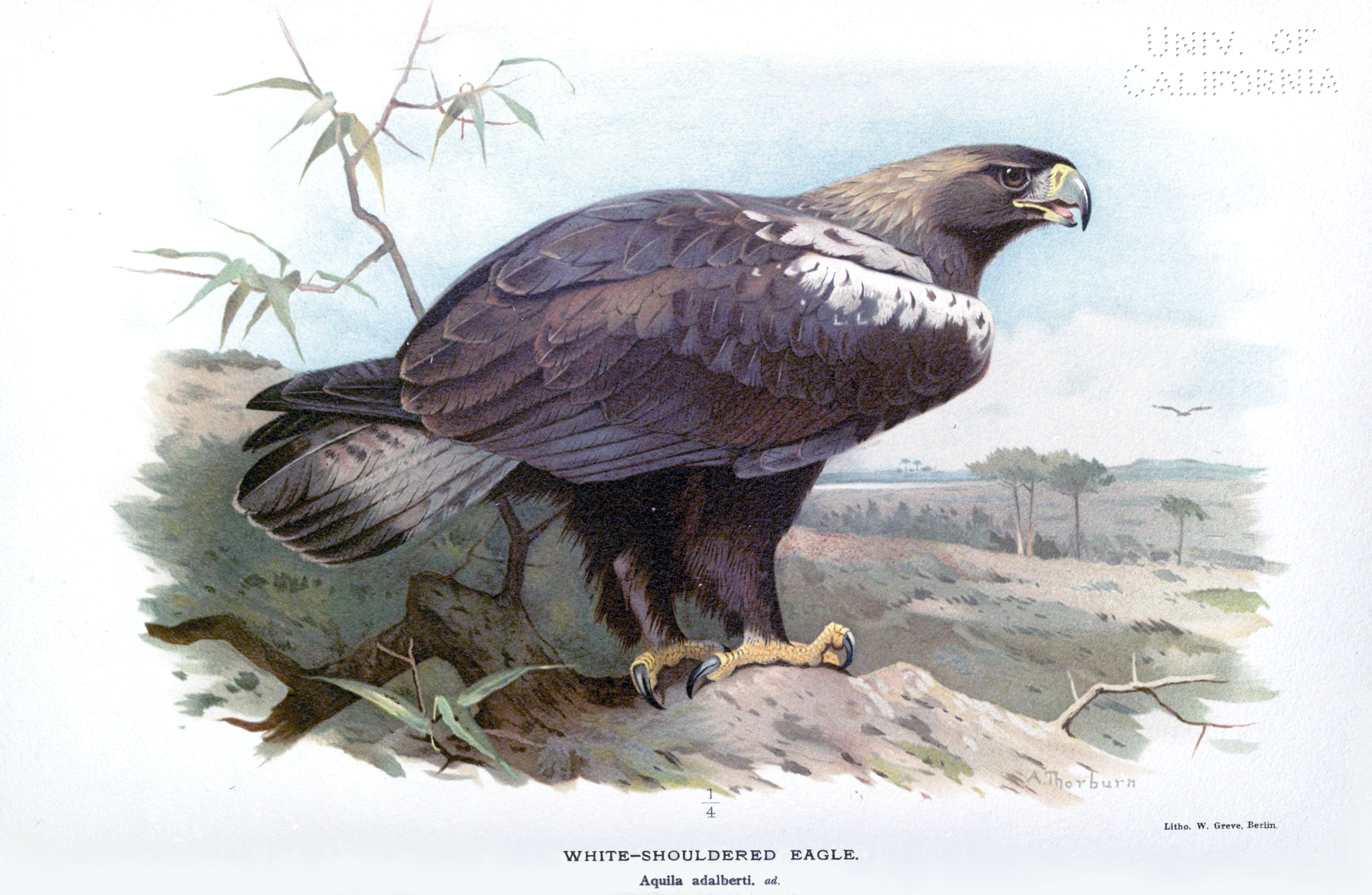
White Shouldered Eagle - one of the colour plates by Archibald Thorburn supplied by Lord Lilford for Irby's 2nd edition

It was Lilford's insistence that saw Irby create the important book titled the "Ornithology of the Straits of Gibraltar". The book was influenced by Irby's annoyance at seeing other people publish work that did not correctly attribute the original findings. Irby was obsessive about only reporting findings he had seen with his own eyes and this did lead to him not recording some species that were known to be there. In the second edition he was persuaded to also include the findings of Cole Verner and his friend Lord Lilford supplied fine colour pictures of birds of prey. This book recorded many new observations of birds on both sides of the Straits in Europe and in Africa.

Irby retired in 1874 after spending three years on half pay. His interest in birds continued holidaying with William Willoughby Cole Verner on Tiree. They had first met in 1877 and this was the start of a lifelong friendship.

Irby died in the Regent's Park area of London in 1905.

== Family ==
Irby married Geraldine Alicia Mary Magenis on 31 August 1864 and they had two sons. Following her death in 1882, he married Mary Brandling, daughter of Colonel John James Brandling, on 22 January 1884, and they had a daughter, Frances Margaret Irby.
