= Kimberley, New Zealand =

Kimberley
- Rural Area
- Location within New Zealand
- Coordinates: 43°26′49.403″S 172°7′15.952″E
- Country: New Zealand
- Region: Canterbury
- Territorial authority: Selwyn District
- Electorates: Selwyn; Te Tai Tonga (Maori electorate)
- Postcode(s): 7571

Kimberley is a rural area in the Selwyn District of the South Island of New Zealand. It is 35 kilometres (22 mi) west of the outskirts of Christchurch and directly north of Darfield. It consists of an old hall, a cemetery and arable and sheep farming land.

A magnitude 7.1 earthquake occurred south of Kimberley at 4:35 am on 4 September 2010, causing widespread damage to buildings in the districts of Selwyn, Christchurch and Waimakariri.
