= John Wodehouse, 4th Earl of Kimberley =

British peer and politician

The Right Honourable The Earl of Kimberley

Member of the House of Lords
- Lord Temporal
- as a hereditary peer 16 April 1941 – 11 November 1999
- Preceded by: The 3rd Earl of Kimberley
- Succeeded by: Seat abolished

Personal details
- Born: John Wodehouse; 12 May 1924
- Died: 26 May 2002 (aged 78)
- Spouses: Diana Legh (m. 1945; div. 1948) Carmel Dunnett (m. 1949; div. 1952) Cynthia Westendarp (m. 1953; div. 1961) Margaret Simons (m. 1961; div. 1965) Gillian Ireland-Smith (m. 1970; div. 1982) Jane Consett (m. 1982)
- Children: John Wodehouse, 5th Earl of Kimberley; Hon. Edward Wodehouse; Hon. Henry Wodehouse; Hon. Charles Wodehouse
- Parents: John Wodehouse, 3rd Earl of Kimberley; Margaret Irby
- Education: Eton College; Magdalene College, Cambridge
- Occupation: Peer, bobsledder
- Military career
- Allegiance: United Kingdom
- Branch: British Army
- Service years: 1942–1945
- Rank: Lieutenant
- Unit: Guards Armoured Division
- Conflict: World War II

John Wodehouse, 4th Earl of Kimberley (12 May 1924 – 26 May 2002), styled Lord Wodehouse between 1932 and 1941, was an active British peer, and also a bobsled racer and Cresta member.

== Background and education ==
Wodehouse was the son of John Wodehouse, then Lord Wodehouse (eldest son of the 2nd Earl of Kimberley), and Margaret Irby, and succeeded to the earldom in 1941 when his father was killed in an air raid. He was educated at Eton and Magdalene College, Cambridge, and served with the Grenadier Guards in the Guards Armoured Division in 1943–1945.

Wodehouse was the godson of the writer P. G. Wodehouse, a distant cousin (third cousins thrice removed), both being descended from Sir Armine Wodehouse, 5th Baronet.

== Personal life ==
Lord Kimberley had the reputation of being Britain's most married peer, having married six times. His first marriage was on 27 October 1945 to Diana Evelyn Legh, daughter of Sir Piers Legh; they divorced in 1949. His next marriage was to Australian Carmel June Dunnett (née Maguire) on 9 February 1949. They had a son before divorcing in 1952:

- John Wodehouse, 5th Earl of Kimberley

Lord Kimberley's marriage was to Cynthia Westendarp (née Abdy Collins) on 15 September 1953, but they were divorced in 1961. Together they had two sons:

- Hon. Edward Abdy Wodehouse (born 29 May 1954)
- Hon. Henry Wyndham Wodehouse (born 26 April 1956); served in the Special Branch of the Metropolitan Police

His next marriage was to model Margaret Simons on 7 July 1961, but they were also divorced, in 1965. Wodehouse then wed Gillian Ireland-Smith on 8 August 1970. They divorced in 1982, so that he could marry Sarah 'Jane' Hope Consett, daughter of Lieutenant-Colonel A. P. Consett, DSO, MC, Grenadier Guards, on 20 August 1982. This marriage lasted for the remainder of his life.

== Politics ==
Lord Kimberley was the Vice-President of the World Council on Alcoholism, an Associate of the Royal Aeronautical Society, and sometime Liberal Spokesman on Aerospace, Defence and Voluntary Community Services in the House of Lords. However, in 1979 he joined the Conservative Party. He was a long-standing member of the House of Lords All-Party Defence Group (Hon.Secretary from 1978) and became U.K. delegate to the North Atlantic Assembly from 1981. From that year he was a member of the Air League Council. He was a member of the Association of Conservative Peers, of the British Maritime League Council, the Royal United Services Institute, the Institute for Strategic Studies and the British Atlantic Committee.

For some years he was an active member of the Conservative Monday Club, joining in 1982 and was the next year appointed chairman of the Club's Foreign Affairs Committee as well as joining their Executive Council. Under his committee chairmanship a Club Policy Paper was published in August that year on The Future of Hong Kong by barrister David Sparrow. In his capacity as Chairman of the Club's Foreign Affairs Committee he also addressed the NATO Plenary Session in June that year supporting the deployment of cruise missiles, and on 8 October 1983 addressed the Club's South-western Region day-conference at Taunton on the subject of "Defence and C.N.D."

He wrote a memoir entitled The Whim of the Wheel, after he suffered a stroke in 1998. He also contributed to the debate in the House of Lords on Unidentified Flying Objects:

"UFOs defy worldly logic... The human mind cannot begin to comprehend UFO characteristics: their propulsion, their sudden appearance, their disappearance, their great speeds, their silence, their manoeuvre, their apparent anti-gravity, their changing shapes." EARL OF KIMBERLEY House of Lords.

Peerage of the United Kingdom
Preceded by John Wodehouse	Earl of Kimberley; 1941–2002; Member of the House of Lords (1941–1999)	Succeeded by John Wodehouse
Peerage of Great Britain
Preceded by John Wodehouse	Baron Wodehouse; 1941–2002	Succeeded by John Wodehouse
Baronetage of England
Preceded by John Wodehouse	Wodehouse baronets 1941–2002	Succeeded by John Wodehouse
