= Earl of Kimberley =

Title in the peerage of the United Kingdom

Earldom of Kimberley
- Arms: Sable a chevron or guttée de sang between three cinquefoils ermine
- Creation date: 1 June 1866
- Created by: Queen Victoria
- Peerage: Peerage of the United Kingdom
- First holder: John Wodehouse, 3rd Baron Wodehouse
- Present holder: John Wodehouse, 5th Earl of Kimberley
- Heir apparent: David Wodehouse, Lord Wodehouse
- Remainder to: the 1st Earl's heirs male of the body
- Subsidiary titles: Baron Wodehouse
- Motto: Over the Crest: Frappe fort ("Strike Hard"); Beneath the Shield: Agincourt

Earl of Kimberley, of Kimberley in the County of Norfolk, is a title in the Peerage of the United Kingdom. It was created in 1866 for the prominent Liberal politician John Wodehouse, 3rd Baron Wodehouse. During his long political career, he notably held office as Lord Lieutenant of Ireland, Secretary of State for the Colonies, Secretary of State for India and Secretary of State for Foreign Affairs. He was succeeded by his son, the second Earl. At first a Liberal like his father, he later joined the Labour Party, becoming the first Labour member of the House of Lords. His eldest son, the third Earl, represented Norfolk Mid in the House of Commons as a Liberal. Since 2002, the titles are held by the latter's grandson, the fifth Earl.

== Background ==
The title of Baron Wodehouse, of Kimberley in the County of Norfolk, was created in the Peerage of Great Britain in 1797 for Sir John Wodehouse, 6th Baronet, of Wilberhall. He had previously represented Norfolk in Parliament. His son, the second Baron, sat as Member of Parliament for Great Bedwyn and Marlborough. He was succeeded by his grandson, the aforementioned third Baron (son of the Hon. Henry Wodehouse), who was created Earl of Kimberley in 1866.

The Wodehouse baronetcy, of Wilberhall in the County of Norfolk, was created in the Baronetage of England in 1611 for Philip Wodehouse, previously Member of Parliament for Castle Rising. His son, the second Baronet, was Member of Parliament for Thetford. He was succeeded by his son, the third Baronet, who represented Thetford as well as Norfolk in the House of Commons. His grandson, the fourth Baronet, was also Member of Parliament for these constituencies. His son, the fifth Baronet, represented Norfolk in Parliament. He was succeeded by his son, the aforementioned sixth Baronet, who was elevated to the peerage in 1797.

Several other members of the Wodehouse family have also gained distinction. The author P. G. Wodehouse was the great-grandson of the Reverend Philip Wodehouse, second son of the fifth Baronet. The politician Edmond Wodehouse was the son of Thomas Wodehouse, third son of the fifth Baronet. His eldest son was the colonial administrator Sir Philip Wodehouse, Governor of Bombay from 1872 to 1877. Sir Philip Wodehouse's son Edmond Wodehouse represented Bath in the House of Commons as a Unionist. The Hon. Armine Wodehouse, younger son of the first Earl, was a civil servant and Liberal politician.

The family seat is Hailstone House, near Cricklade, Wiltshire.

== Wodehouse baronets, of Wilberhall (1611) ==
- Sir Philip Wodehouse, 1st Baronet (d. 1623)
- Sir Thomas Wodehouse, 2nd Baronet (c. 1585 – 1658)
- Sir Philip Wodehouse, 3rd Baronet (1608–1681)
  - Sir Thomas Wodehouse (d. 1671)
- Sir John Wodehouse, 4th Baronet (1669–1754)
  - William Wodehouse (c. 1706–1737)
- Sir Armine Wodehouse, 5th Baronet (c. 1714 – 1777)
- Sir John Wodehouse, 6th Baronet (1741–1834) (created Baron Wodehouse in 1797)

=== Baron Wodehouse (1797) ===
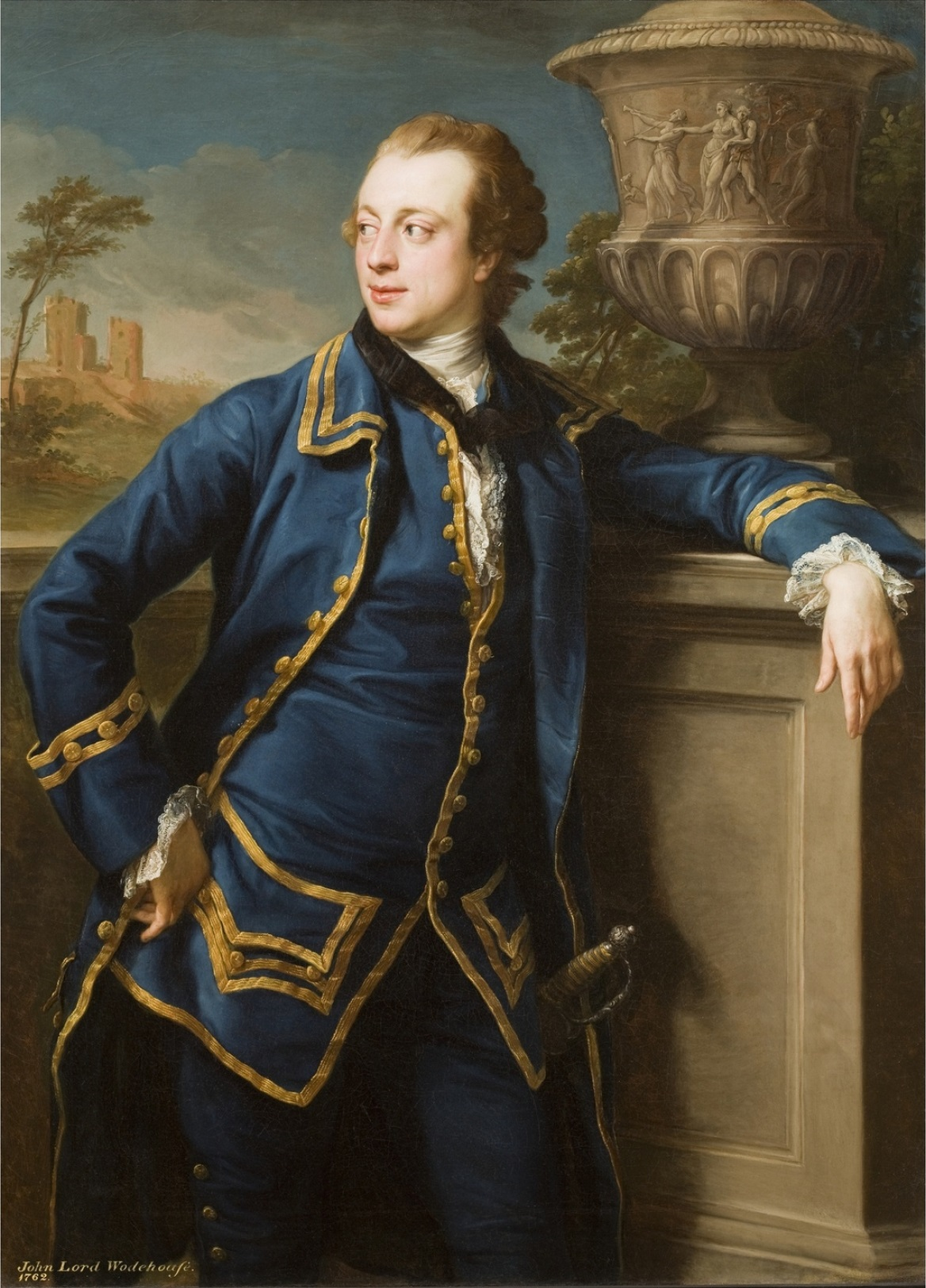
John Wodehouse, 1st Baron Wodehouse, at age 23

- John Wodehouse, 1st Baron Wodehouse (1741–1834)
- John Wodehouse, 2nd Baron Wodehouse (1770–1846)
  - The Hon. Henry Wodehouse (1799–1834)
- John Wodehouse, 3rd Baron Wodehouse (1826–1902) (created Earl of Kimberley in 1866)

=== Earl of Kimberley (1866) ===
- John Wodehouse, 1st Earl of Kimberley (1826–1902)
- John Wodehouse, 2nd Earl of Kimberley (1848–1932)
- John Wodehouse, 3rd Earl of Kimberley (1883–1941)
- John Wodehouse, 4th Earl of Kimberley (1924–2002)
- John Armine Wodehouse, 5th Earl of Kimberley (b. 1951)

The heir apparent is the present holder's only son, David Simon John Wodehouse, Lord Wodehouse (b. 1978), whose heir is his son Hon. Jasper John Wodehouse (b. 2017).

=== Male-line family tree ===
Male-line family tree

Male-line family tree, Wodehouse baronets, Barons Wodehouse, and Earls of Kimberley.

Sir Philip Wodehouse; 1st Baronet died 1623
Sir Thomas Wodehouse; 2nd Baronet c. 1585 – 1658
Sir Philip Wodehouse; 3rd Baronet; 1608–1681
Sir Thomas Wodehouse died 1671
Sir John Wodehouse; 4th Baronet; 1669–1754
William Wodehouse c. 1706 – 1731	Sir Armine Wodehouse; 5th Baronet c. 1714 – 1777
Baron Wodehouse
Sir John Wodehouse; 1st Baron Wodehouse; 6th Baronet; 1741–1834
Sir John Wodehouse; 2nd Baron Wodehouse; 1770–1846
Hon. Henry Wodehouse; 1799–1834
Earl of Kimberley
Sir John Wodehouse; 1st Earl of Kimberley; 3rd Baron Wodehouse; 1826–1902
Sir John Wodehouse; 2nd Earl of Kimberley; 1848–1932
Sir John Wodehouse; 3rd Earl of Kimberley; 1883–1941
Sir John Wodehouse; 4th Earl of Kimberley; 1924–2002
Sir John Wodehouse; 5th Earl of Kimberley born 1951
David Wodehouse; Lord Wodehouse born 1978
Hon. Jasper Wodehouse born 2017

Baronetage of England
Preceded by Kniveton baronets	Wodehouse baronets 29 June 1611	Succeeded by Pope baronets
