= John Wodehouse, 2nd Baron Wodehouse =

British politician

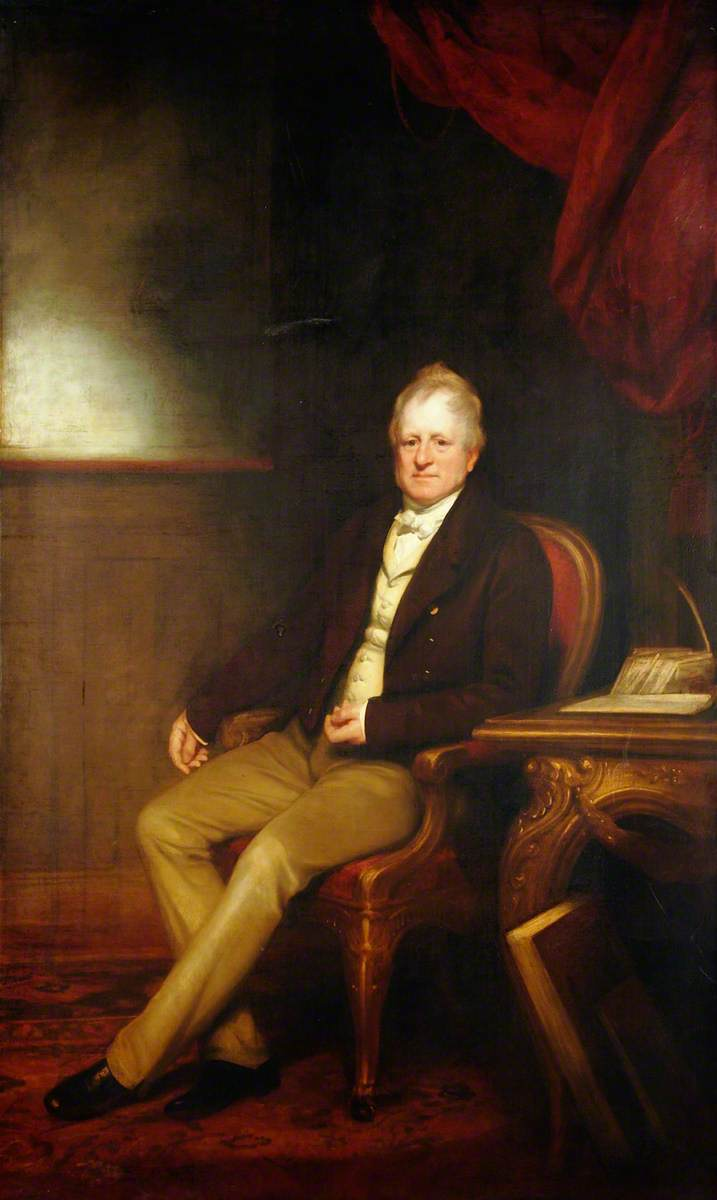
John Wodehouse in 1832, painted by Thomas Phillips

John Wodehouse, 2nd Baron Wodehouse (11 January 1771 – 31 May 1846), styled The Honourable John Wodehouse from 1797 to 1834, was a British peer and Member of Parliament.

== Background ==
Wodehouse was the eldest son of John Wodehouse, 1st Baron Wodehouse and Sophia Berkeley. On 10 October 1793 he was commissioned as Captain in the East Norfolk Militia commanded by his father. On 14 July 1798 he was promoted to take over from his father as Colonel, the third generation of his family to command the regiment. In 1842 he was succeeded in command by his own son, Berkeley.

== Political career ==
Wodehouse was elected to the House of Commons for Great Bedwyn in 1796, a seat he held until 1802. In the general election that year he stood for Norfolk, but was defeated by Thomas Coke and Sir Jacob Astley; he was likewise defeated by Coke and William Windham in the 1806 election. He was appointed Lord Lieutenant of Norfolk in 1821. He later represented Marlborough from 1818 to 1826. In 1834 he succeeded his father in the barony and entered the House of Lords as a Conservative. Wodehouse was a Peelite, and gave his proxy to the ministry to vote for repeal of the Corn Laws in the Lords shortly before his death.

== Family ==
Lord Wodehouse married Charlotte Laura Norris, daughter of John Norris, of Witton Park, Norfolk, in 1796. They had eleven children:

- Norris John Wodehouse (May 1798 – 25 May 1819)
- Henry Wodehouse (1799 – 29 April 1834), married Anne Gurdon and left two sons:
  - John Wodehouse, 1st Earl of Kimberley (1826–1902)
  - Henry Wodehouse (27 May 1834 – 20 August 1873) was granted the rank of a baron's younger son in 1847. He married Mary Livingstone King, daughter of John Pendleton King, left no children. His widow later married Henry Paget, 4th Marquess of Anglesey
- Sophia Laura Wodehouse (13 January 1801 – 1869), married Raikes Currie in 1825
- Vice-Admiral Edward Thornton-Wodehouse (5 June 1802 – 17 March 1874), RN, married Diana Thornton and left children
- Charlotte Laura Wodehouse (2 September 1803 – 1878), married Rev. Richard Phayre, left no children
- Henrietta Laura Wodehouse (30 March 1805 – aft. 1890), married John David Chambers in 1834
- Major Berkeley Wodehouse (14 May 1806 – 13 September 1877), married Fanny Holmes and left children
- Caroline Elizabeth Laura (29 December 1810 – 1856), married John Whaites in 1836 and left children
- Cornet Bertram Wodehouse (30 April 1813 – 11 October 1856)
- Reverend Alfred Wodehouse (10 June 1814 – 6 September 1848), married Emma Hamilton Macdonald in 1840 and left children
- Emma Laura Wodehouse (d. 1820)

He died in 1846, aged 76, and was succeeded in the barony by his grandson John, who became a prominent Liberal politician and was created Earl of Kimberley in 1866.

== Notes ==
Parliament of Great Britain
Preceded by Viscount Stopford; Edward Hyde East	Member of Parliament for Great Bedwyn; 1796–1801; With: Thomas Bruce 1796–1796; Robert John Buxton 1797–1801	Succeeded by Parliament of the United Kingdom
Parliament of the United Kingdom
Preceded by Parliament of Great Britain	Member of Parliament for Great Bedwyn; 1801–1802; With: Robert John Buxton	Succeeded by Robert John Buxton; Sir Nathaniel Holland, Bt
Preceded by Edward Stopford; William Noel-Hill	Member of Parliament for Marlborough; 1818–1826; With: Lord Brudenell	Succeeded by Lord Brudenell; Earl Bruce
Honorary titles
Preceded by The Lord Suffield	Lord Lieutenant of Norfolk; 1821–1846	Succeeded by The Earl of Leicester
Preceded by The Lord Suffield	Vice-Admiral of Norfolk; 1822–1846	Vacant
Peerage of Great Britain
Preceded by John Wodehouse	Baron Wodehouse; 1834–1844	Succeeded by John Wodehouse
Baronetage of England
Preceded by John Wodehouse	Baronet of Wilberhall; 1834–1844	Succeeded by John Wodehouse
