= John Wodehouse, 2nd Earl of Kimberley =

British peer, landowner & politician (1848-1932)

John Wodehouse, 2nd Earl of Kimberley (10 December 1848 – 7 January 1932), known as Lord Wodehouse from 1866 to 1902, was a British peer and landowner, who was the first member of the Labour Party in the House of Lords.

Wodehouse was born at the family home in Montagu Square, Marylebone. His father John Wodehouse, 1st Earl of Kimberley was a leading Liberal statesman in the government of William Ewart Gladstone and the family were noted landowners in Norfolk. Like his father he attended Eton College.

He matriculated at Trinity College, Cambridge in 1867. On going down from Cambridge he managed the family estates near Wymondham, becoming a specialist in agriculture. He was also active in the local Liberal Party, acting as party agent; on succeeding to the peerage in 1902 he took the Liberal whip. However, Kimberley was conscious of the increasing organisation of agricultural workers in Norfolk. Small farmers had formed the National Farmers Union in 1908, and the National Union of Agricultural Workers was growing.

Unlike many other farms, Kimberley paid over the wage rate demanded by the NUAW, which made him very popular in the union but at a competitive disadvantage. He spoke up for his workers on Norfolk County Council. The agricultural workers in Norfolk were the backbone of the local Labour Party, and in the general election of 1918, Kimberley sent a telegram of support to the Labour candidate in South Norfolk who was opposing a Liberal who supported the Lloyd George Coalition government. He sent a further telegram in 1920 when there was a by-election which Labour won. This activity caused the press to nickname him the Labour Earl.

Kimberley was returned as a Labour candidate to Norfolk County Council in 1922, and was also Chairman of his Rural District Council and Board of Guardians. However, at this time there were no Labour members in the House of Lords and so he retained the Liberal whip. He transferred his allegiance formally in January 1924 when the first Labour government was formed. He was defeated for re-election to Norfolk County Council in 1925.

Kimberley was a distant cousin of the writer P. G. Wodehouse, both being descended from Sir Armine Wodehouse, 5th Baronet, and the writer was the godfather of his first grandson, the fourth earl.

Two of Kimberley's sons, Philip Wodehouse and Edward Wodehouse, died on active service in the Great War. His eldest son John, a noted polo player, inherited the earldom on his death.

Peerage of the United Kingdom
Preceded by John Wodehouse	Earl of Kimberley; 1902–1932	Succeeded by John Wodehouse
Peerage of Great Britain
Preceded by John Wodehouse	Baron Wodehouse; 1902–1932	Succeeded by John Wodehouse
Baronetage of England
Preceded by John Wodehouse	Baronet of Wilberhall; 1902–1932	Succeeded by John Wodehouse
