= Benaoján =

- Municipality
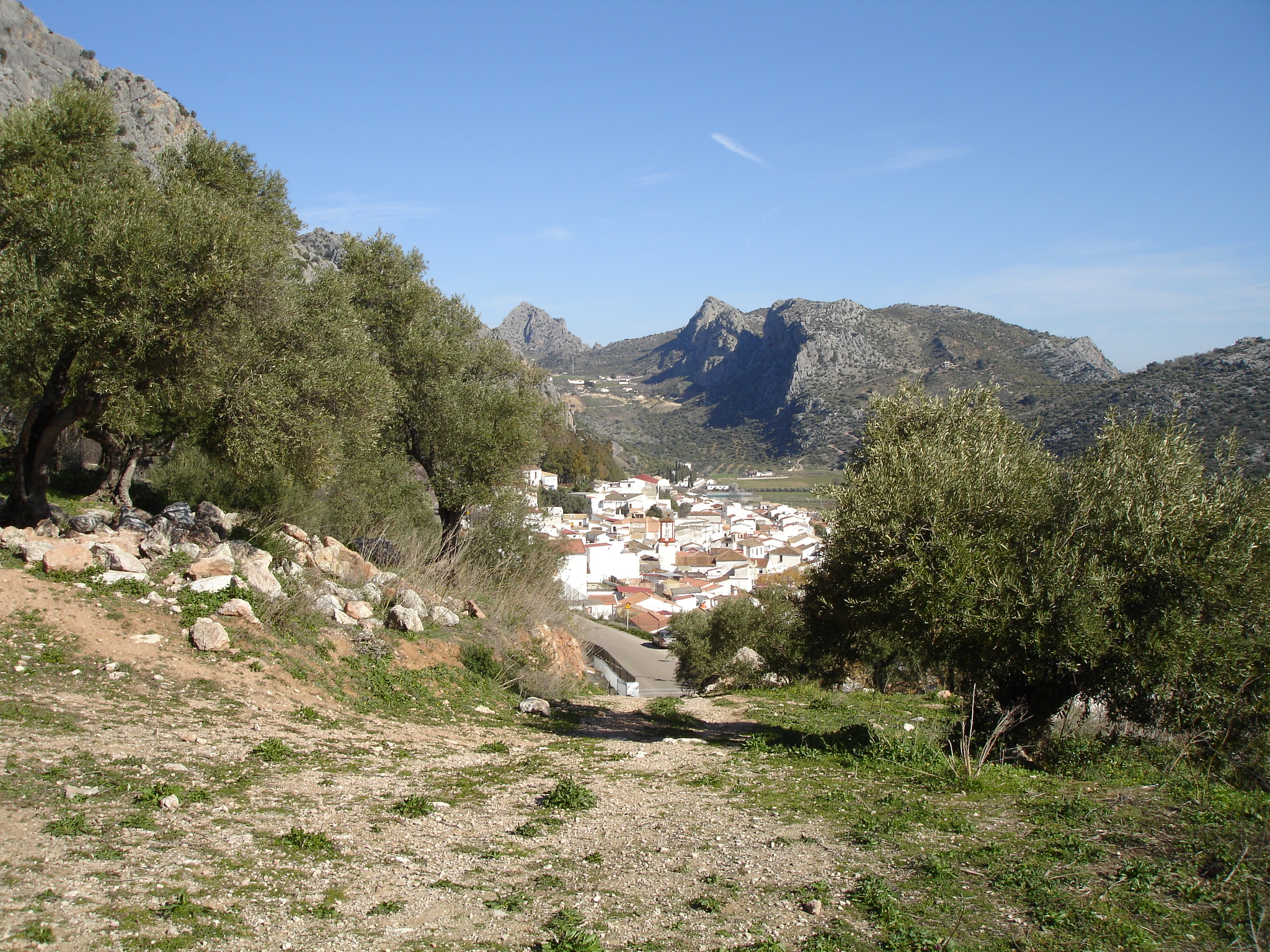

- Coat of arms

- Location in Spain
- Coordinates: 36°43′N 4°15′W
- Country: Spain
- Autonomous community: Andalusia
- Province: Málaga

Government
  - Mayor: Soraya García

Area
  - Total: 32 km^{2} (12 sq mi)
- Elevation: 524 m (1,719 ft)

Population (2025-01-01)
  - Total: 1,427
  - Density: 45/km^{2} (120/sq mi)
- Demonym: Benaojanos
- Time zone: UTC+1 (CET)
  - Summer (DST): UTC+2 (CEST)
- Postal code: 29370
- Official language(s): Spanish
- Website: Official website

Benaoján (Spanish pronunciation: [benaoˈxan]) is a town and municipality in the province of Málaga, part of the autonomous community of Andalusia in southern Spain. It is located within the Sierra de Grazalema Natural Park. Its surface area is 32 km^{2}. The municipality is situated approximately 17 kilometers from Ronda and 116 km from the capital of the province. It is situated at an altitude of 524 meters. Its inhabitants are called benaojanos.

Its name is of Arab origin. Some believe it means children of Oján, from the Berber tribe, and others think "home of the baker."

== Geography ==
The municipality has two towns: Benaoján and Benaoján Station, the first being the center. It has a population of 1,683 people. It has a population density of 50.37 inhabitants/km^{2}. The topography is very rugged karst mountains highlighting the two major geological formations: the Hundidero-Gato system and Cave of the Bathing Pool, of great importance for its prehistoric paintings dating from the Upper Paleolithic, for which it has been declared National Monument of Rock Art. Also, there are other geological cavities of importance scattered throughout the municipality.

It is uneven terrain because of the mountain ranges of Montalate and Líbar and drained by the Guadiaro river. It is highlighted by its oaks, pastures rainfed by the Mediterranean and sheep industry. Its cuisine is highlighted by the sausages and other pork products and dried fruits (especially almonds).

It is also the exact antipode of the suburb of Browns Bay in Auckland, New Zealand.

== History ==
The first evidence of settlement in the land of the current municipality of Benaoján dating back some 250,000 years ago, when Homo heidelbergensis groups using transverse valleys of the Sierra Bética moved between coastal and inland Andalucia. Later the Neantherthal man populated these mountains.

Some 27,000 years ago Homo sapiens arrived. They were living for more than 20,000 years in the Cave of the Bathing Pool, whose walls would contain hundreds of pictorial representations of The Pool, one of the caves with the most important rock art.

When the last ice age ended 10,000 years ago, the fauna of large mammals that inhabited these lands changed which changed the climate as well, which in turn made man's lifestyle change.

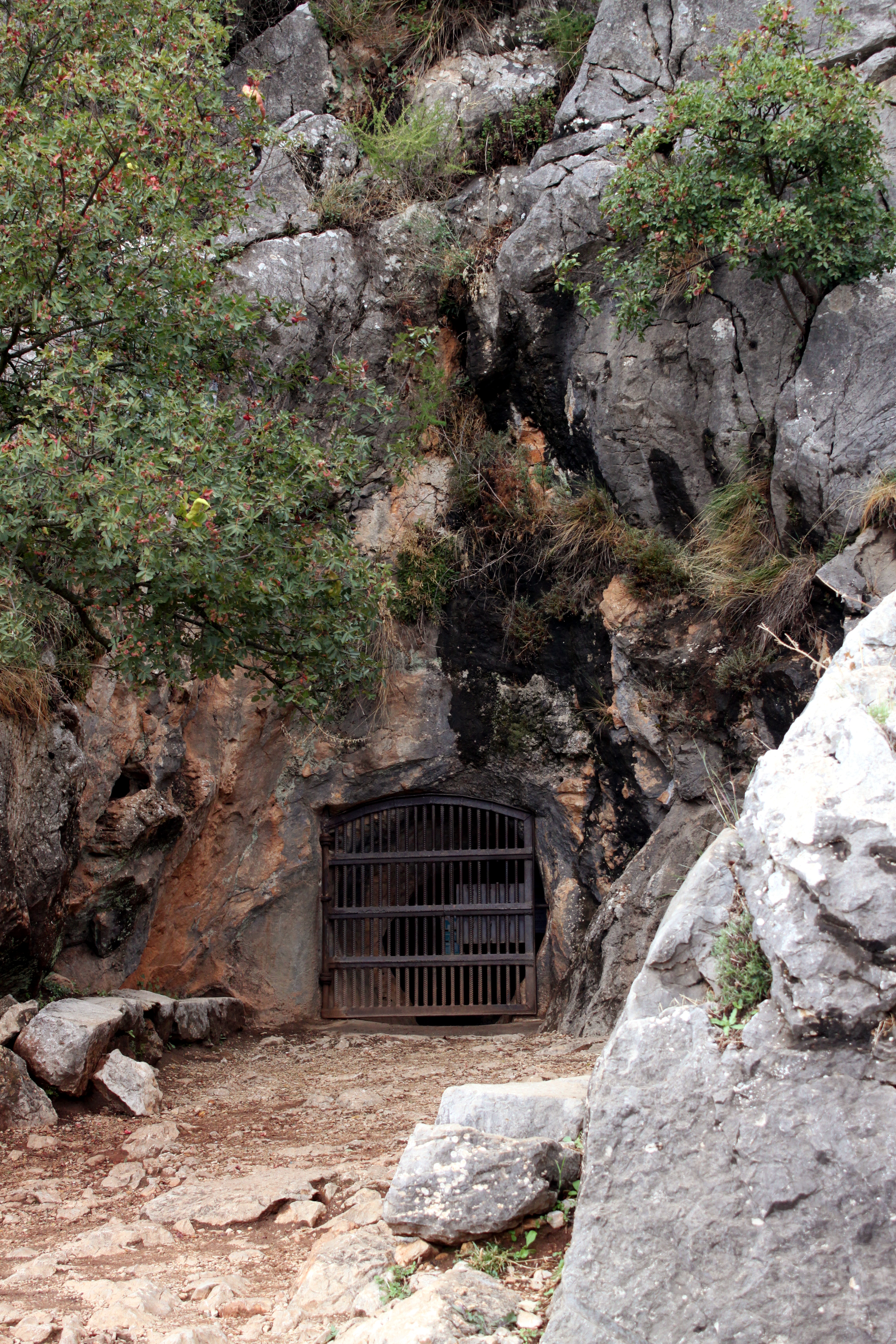
Entrance to the cave

== Sister cities ==
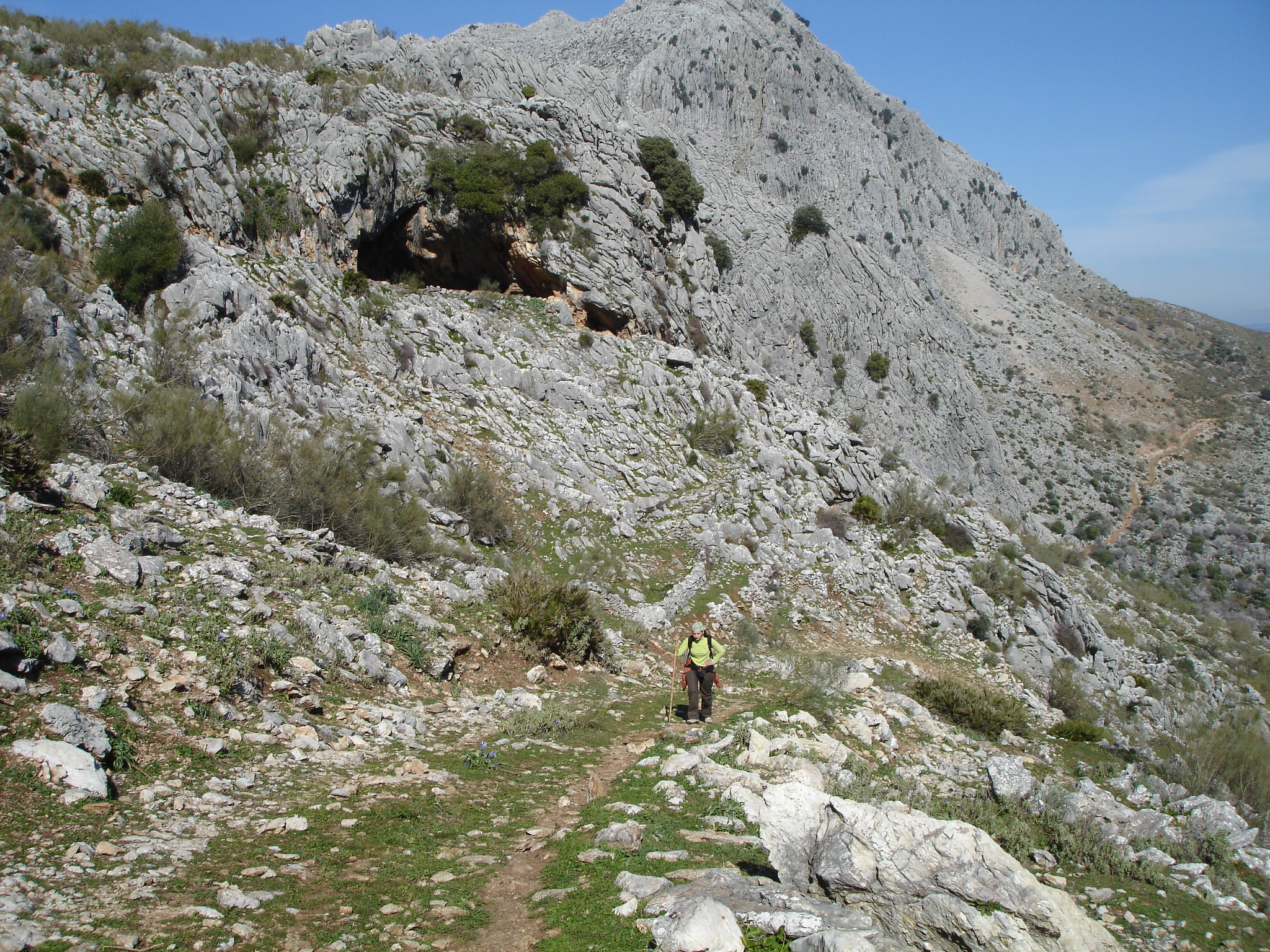
Path from Benaoján to Llanos de Líbar

- Knittlingen (Germany)

== See also ==
- List of municipalities in Málaga
