= Michael Maguire (footballer) =

Australian rules footballer

Mick Maguire
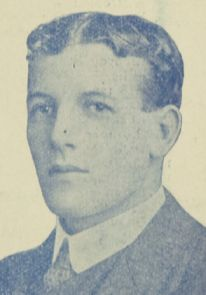

Personal information
- Born: 6 June 1894; Richmond, Victoria
- Died: 4 June 1950 (aged 55); London, England
- Original teams: Christian Brothers, Abbotsford

Playing career^{1}
Years	Club	Games (Goals)
1910–1912	Richmond	39 (62)
1912–1914	Melbourne	19 (23)
1918	Collingwood	9 (10)
Total		67 (95)
- ^{1} Playing statistics correct to the end of 1918.

Career highlights
- Richmond Leading Goalkicker 1910, 1911

Michael 'Mick' Maguire (6 June 1894 – 4 June 1950) was an Australian rules footballer who played for the Richmond Football Club in the VFL from 1910 to Round 8 of the 1912 season, then played for the Melbourne Football Club for the rest of 1912 to 1914. Finally he played for the Collingwood Football Club in 1918.

He holds the record as the youngest player to have played senior football at Richmond, being only 15 years and 328 days old upon debut in Round 1 of the 1910 season. Despite this, he was the club's leading goalkicker in his debut year. He also gained some notoriety as a welterweight boxer between 1912 and 1915.

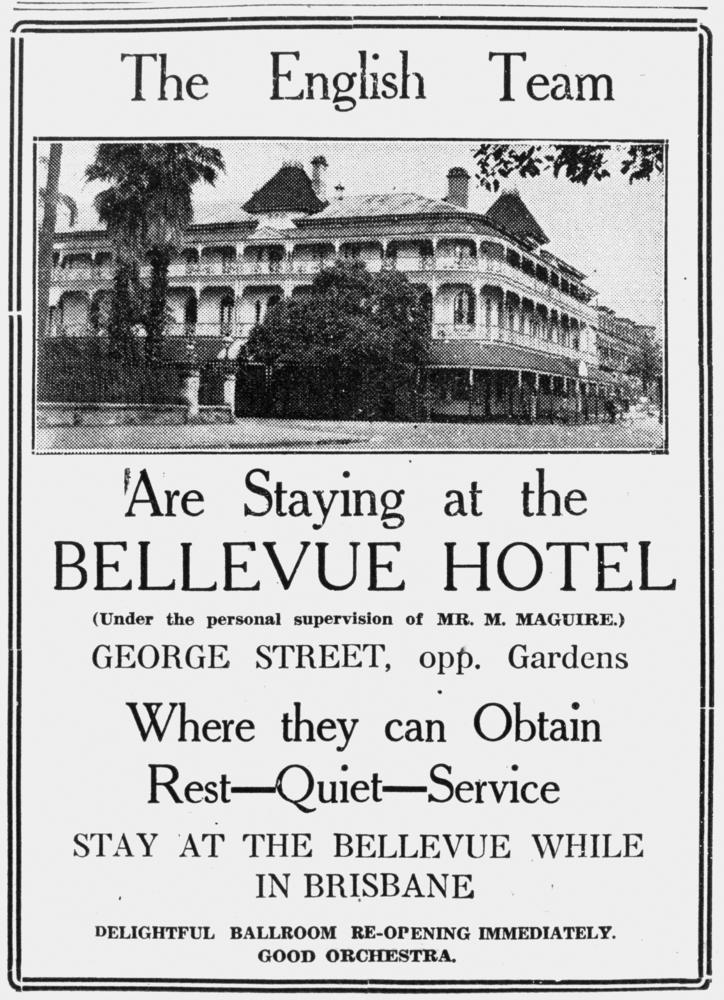
Maguire's Bellevue hotel accommodated the English Cricket Team during the Fourth Test of the 'Bodyline' Series

Maguire was a well-known publican in Melbourne, operating the Bull and Mouth Hotel in Melbourne, and after 1932, Bellevue Hotel in Brisbane. He was father to five daughters; sometimes known as "the fabulous Maguires." Two daughters married members of the English nobility and Mary Maguire was briefly a Hollywood and British film actress in the late 1930s. Maguire died in England in 1950.
