= John Wodehouse, 1st Baron Wodehouse =

British landowner, Member of Parliament and peer

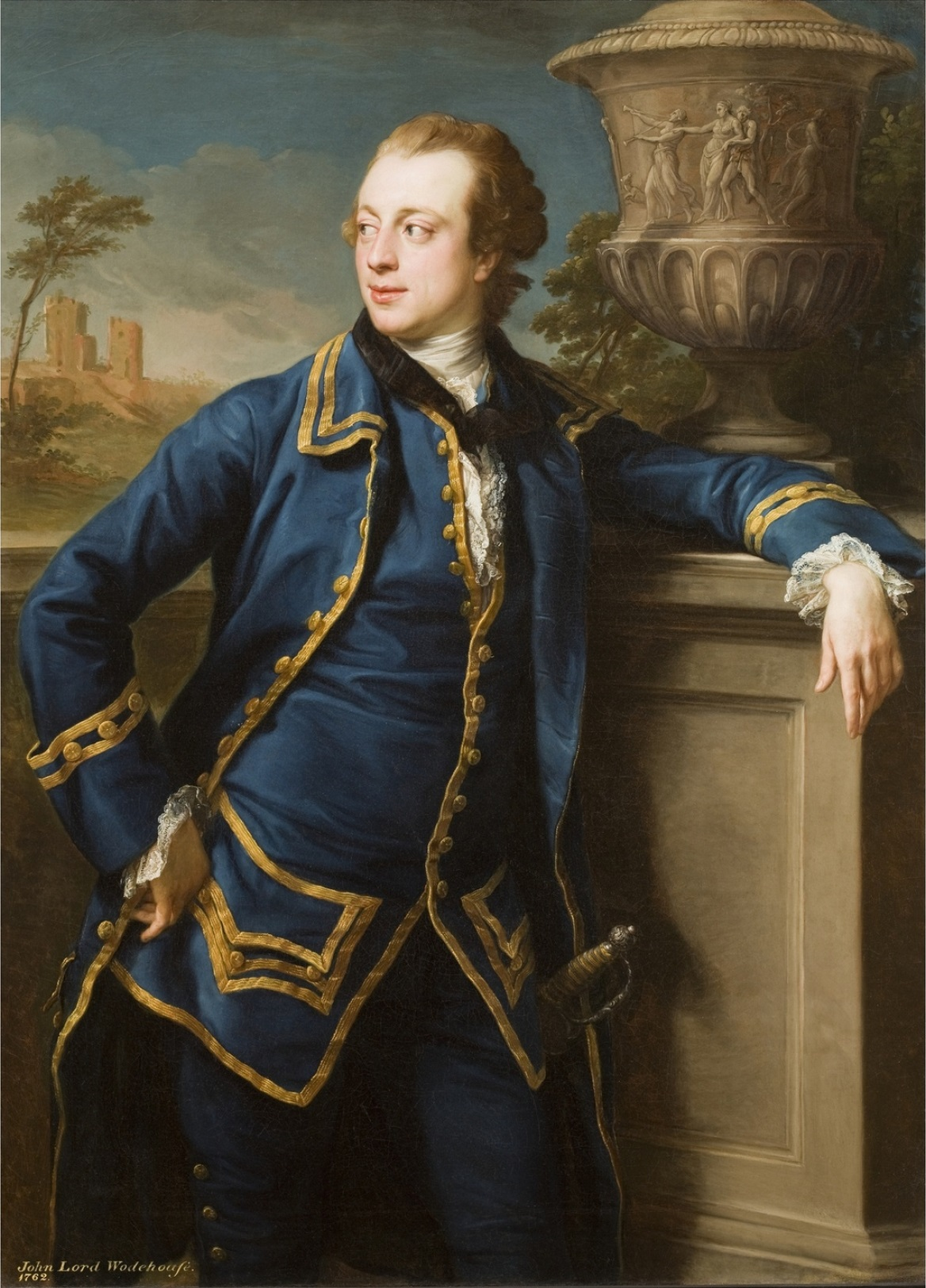
Portrait of John Wodehouse, by Pompeo Batoni, 1764

John Wodehouse, 1st Baron Wodehouse (4 April 1741 – 29 May 1834), known as Sir John Wodehouse, 6th Baronet, from 1777 to 1797, was a British landowner, Member of Parliament and peer.

== Life ==
Wodehouse was the son of Sir Armine Wodehouse, 5th Baronet, and Letitia Bacon. When his father raised the East Norfolk Militia in 1758 he 'marched as private militiaman' in the regiment. He was promoted to Lieutenant-Colonel in May 1774 and the following month took over the command from his father as Colonel of the Regiment. He retained the command until 1798 when he resigned in favour of his own son John. He succeeded his father in the baronetcy in 1777 and in 1784 he was elected to the House of Commons for Norfolk, a seat he held until 1797. In that year, he was raised to the peerage as Baron Wodehouse, of Kimberley in the County of Norfolk.

In 1778, Wodehouse commissioned Capability Brown, to undertake a series of enhancements to his country seat, Kimberley Hall near Wymondham (Brown had previously undertaken works for Sir Armine in 1762). By 1827, Woodhouse had developed a pleasure ground, a southward extension to the park and three lodge entrances. The landscape which Wodehouse created has largely survived and is listed Grade II*. Wodehouse died in May 1834, aged 93, and was succeeded in his titles by his eldest son.

== Personal life ==
Wodehouse married Sophia née Berkeley (died 16 April 1825), daughter of Charles Berkeley of Bruton Abbey, on 30 March 1769. Together the couple had four sons and two daughters:

- John Wodehouse, 2nd Baron Wodehouse (11 January 1771 – 29 May 1846)
- Vice-Admiral Philip Wodehouse (16 July 1773 – 21 January 1838), Royal Navy officer
- Reverend Armine Wodehouse (12 March 1776 – 9 April 1853), clergyman
- Reverend William Wodehouse (4 April 1782 – 3 April 1870), clergyman
- Sophia Wodehouse (d. 22 June 1852), unmarried
- Letitia Wodehouse (d. 3 March 1864), married firstly Sir Thomas Maynard Hesilrige, 10th Baronet, and secondly F. Fielding, barrister

== Citations ==
Parliament of Great Britain
Preceded by Sir Edward Astley, Bt. Thomas Coke	Member of Parliament for Norfolk; 1784–1797; With: Sir Edward Astley, Bt. 1784–1790; Thomas Coke 1790–1797	Succeeded by Thomas Coke; Sir Jacob Astley, Bt.
Peerage of Great Britain
New creation	Baron Wodehouse; 1797–1834	Succeeded by John Wodehouse
Baronetage of England
Preceded by Armine Wodehouse	Baronet of Wilberhall; 1777–1834	Succeeded by John Wodehouse
