= Irby (surname) =

Irby is a surname. Notable people with the surname include:

- Anthony Irby (1577–1610), English politician
- Anthony Irby (died 1625) (1547-1625), English Master of Chancery, Recorder and MP of Boston
- Anthony Irby (died 1682) (1605–1682), English Member of Parliament for Boston
- Charles Irby, software architect
- Charles Leonard Irby (1789-1845), explorer and writer, son of Frederick Irby, 2nd Baron Boston
- Edward Irby (1676–1718), English Member of Parliament
- Ella Mae Irby (1923-2001), American artist
- Florance Irby, 5th Baron Boston (1837-1877)
- Fred Irby III, American jazz professor
- Frederick Paul Irby (1779–1844), Royal Navy officer and son of Frederick Irby, 2nd Baron Boston
- Frederick Irby, 2nd Baron Boston {1749-1825)
- George Irby, 3rd Baron Boston (1777-1856)
- George Irby, 4th Baron Boston (1802-1869)
- George Irby, 6th Baron Boston (1860-1941)
- Henry Irby (1807–1879), founder of Buckhead, Atlanta, Georgia
- Howard Irby (1836–1905), British ornithologist and army officer
- John L. M. Irby (1854–1900), US Senator representing South Carolina
- John R. Irby, editor of the Bismarck Tribune
- Joyce Irby, bassist and co-lead vocalist of Klymaxx
- Lee Irby (born 1963), American novelist and historian
- Leonard Irby (by 1522-1571), English MP
- Lynna Irby (born 1998), American sprinter
- Kenneth Irby (1936–2015), American poet
- Margaret Irby (1884–1950), English socialite, Countess of Kimberley
- Michael Irby (born 1972), American film and television actor
- Nathan Irby (born 1931), American former politician
- Pamela Irby (born 1964), American former rugby union player
- Paulina Irby (1831–1911), British travel writer, suffragist and philanthropist
- Samantha Irby, African-American blogger, comedian and author
- Sherman Irby, jazz alto saxophonist
- William Irby, 1st Baron Boston (1707-1775)

- Scott Irby-Ranniar (born 1984) American actor and singer

== See also ==
- Irby (given name) - for people with the given name of Irby
