= Florance Irby, 5th Baron Boston =

British peer (1837–1877)

The Right Honourable The Lord Boston
- Born: Florance George Henry Irby; 9 May 1837
- Died: 4 January 1877 (aged 39); Anglesey, Wales
- Education: Eton College
- Spouse: Hon. Augusta Caroline Saumarez (m. 1859; died 1877)
- Children: 5, including George
- Parent(s): George Irby, 4th Baron Boston; Fanny Elizabeth Hopkins-Northey

Florance George Henry Irby, 5th Baron Boston (9 May 1837 – 4 January 1877) was a British peer.

== Early life ==
George Florance Irby was born on 9 May 1837. He was the eldest son of George Irby, 4th Baron Boston and Fanny Elizabeth Hopkins-Northey (d. 1860). After the death of his mother in 1860, his father married his wife's elder sister, Hon. Caroline Amelia Saumarez, in 1861.

His paternal grandparents were George Irby, 3rd Baron Boston and Rachel Ives Drake (a daughter of William Drake, MP for Amersham). His maternal grandparents were Anne Elizabeth Fortescue (sister to Thomas Fortescue, both children of Gerald Fortescue) and William Richard Hopkins-Northey of Oving House, Buckinghamshire.

He was educated at Eton College.

== Career ==
Upon the death of his father on 22 December 1869, he succeeded as the 5th Baron Boston, of Boston, Lincolnshire in the Peerage of Great Britain, as well as the 6th Baronet Irby, of Whaplode and Boston, Lincolnshire in the Baronetage of Great Britain.

The seats of the Barons Boston were Hedsor Lodge, near Maidenhead; The Grange, Hitcham, near Maidenhead; Llanidan Hall, near Carnarvon; and Porthamel, Isle of Anglesey, Wales.

== Personal life ==
On 17 October 1859 at St Paul's Church, Knightsbridge, Irby was married to Hon. Augusta Caroline Saumarez (1841–1929), second daughter of John Saumarez, 3rd Baron de Saumarez and, his first wife, Caroline Esther Rhodes (daughter of William Rhodes of Kirskill Hall, Yorkshire, and Bramhope Hall, Yorkshire). Together, they were the parents of:

- George Florance Irby, 6th Baron Boston (1860–1941), who married his first cousin, once removed, Cecilia Constance Irby, daughter of Hon. Augustus Anthony Frederick Irby (a younger son of the 3rd Baron Boston) and Jessie Augusta Montgomery-Cuninghame (a daughter of Sir Thomas Montgomery-Cuninghame, 8th Baronet), in 1890.
- Hon. Cecil Saumarez Irby (1862–1935), who married Florence Augusta Dormer, daughter of Clement Upton-Cottrell-Dormer of Rousham House and Florence Anne Upton, in 1885.
- Hon. Alice Fanny Catherine Irby (1863–1953), who married Gordon Frederic Deedes, eldest son of Rev. Canon Gordon Frederick Deedes, in 1890.
- Hon. Gilbert Neville Smyth (1864–1940), who married Esmé Edwards, daughter of George Oldham Edwards and Emily Frances Way, in 1891.
- Hon. Winifred Mary Irby (1870–1933), who married Sir Henry Hamilton Johnston, son of John Brookes Johnston, in 1896.
- Hon. Evelyn Maud Mary Irby (1875–1876), who died young.

Lord Boston died on 4 January 1877 at Porthamel, Anglesey, Wales. After his death, his widow married Sir Henry Percy Anderson, Assistant Undersecretary for Foreign Affairs, in 1883. He was succeeded in the barony by his eldest son, George. Upon his death without issue in 1941, the barony passed to Greville Northey Irby and Cecil Eustace Irby, both sons of his second son, Cecil.

Peerage of Great Britain
Preceded by George Ives Irby	Baron Boston; 1869–1877	Succeeded by George Florance Irby
