= George Irby, 4th Baron Boston =

English peer and landowner (1802–1869)

The Right Honourable The Lord Boston
- Born: George Ives Irby; 14 September 1802
- Died: 22 December 1869 (aged 67); Belgravia, London
- Education: Eton College; Balliol College, Oxford
- Spouse(s): Fanny Elizabeth Hopkins-Northey (m. 1830; died 1860) Hon. Caroline Amelia Saumarez (m. 1861; died 1869)
- Children: 5, including Florance
- Parent(s): George Irby, 3rd Baron Boston; Rachel Ives Drake
- Relatives: George Irby, 6th Baron Boston (grandson); Frederick Irby, 2nd Baron Boston (grandfather); William Drake (grandfather)

George Ives Irby, 4th Baron Boston (14 September 1802 – 22 December 1869) was an English peer and landowner.

== Early life ==
George Ives Irby was born on 14 September 1802. He was the son of George Irby, 3rd Baron Boston and Rachel Ives Drake. Among his siblings were Hon. Charlotte Isabella Irby, Hon. Rachel Emily Irby, Hon. Frances Matilda Irby, Hon. Frederica Maria Louisa Irby, Hon. Georgina Albinia Irby, Hon. Catherine Cecilia Irby, Hon. William Drake Irby, Hon. Augustus Anthony Frederick Irby, and Rev. Hon. Llewellyn Charles Robert Irby.

His paternal grandparents were Frederick Irby, 2nd Baron Boston and Christian Methuen (sister of Paul Cobb Methuen, both children of Paul Methuen of Corsham Court, MP for Westbury, Warwick, and Great Bedwyn). His father was a first cousin of Paul Methuen, 1st Baron Methuen. His maternal grandparents were William Drake, MP for Amersham, and Rachel Elizabeth Ives (a daughter of Jeremiah Ives, of Norwich).

Between 1814 and 1817, he was educated at Eton College. He matriculated at Balliol College, Oxford on 1 February 1821, graduating in 1824 with a Bachelor of Arts.

== Career ==
On 7 February 1831 he was commissioned as a captain in the disembodied Royal Buckinghamshire Militia (King's Own), a nominal position that he retained into the 1850s.

Upon the death of his father on 12 March 1856, he succeeded as the 4th Baron Boston, of Boston, Lincolnshire in the Peerage of Great Britain, as well as the 5th Baronet Irby, of Whaplode and Boston, Lincolnshire in the Baronetage of Great Britain.

The seats of the Barons Boston were Hedsor Lodge, near Maidenhead; The Grange, Hitcham, near Maidenhead; Llanidan Hall, near Carnarvon; and Porthamel, Isle of Anglesey, Wales.

== Personal life ==
On 25 January 1830, he married Fanny Elizabeth Hopkins-Northey (d. 1860), daughter of William Richard Hopkins-Northey and Anne Elizabeth Fortescue. Before her death in 1860, they were the parents of:

- Hon. Rachel Fanny Anne Irby (1831–1909), who married Augustus Arthur Vansittart, son of George Henry Vansittart of Bisham Abbey and Anna Maria Copson (daughter and co-heiress of Thomas Copson of Sheppey Hall), in 1857.
- Florance George Henry Irby, 5th Baron Boston (1837–1877), who married Hon. Augusta Caroline Saumarez, second daughter of John Saumarez, 3rd Baron de Saumarez and Caroline Esther Rhodes, in 1859.
- Hon. Alice Frederica Irby (1839–1896), who married John Malcolm, 1st Baron Malcolm of Poltalloch, son of John Malcolm, 14th of Poltalloch, Argyll, and Isabella Harriet Wingfield (a daughter of John Wingfield), in 1861.

On 20 July 1861 at St George's, Hanover Square, he married his son's sister-in-law, Hon. Caroline Amelia Saumarez, eldest daughter of John Saumarez, 3rd Baron de Saumarez and, his first wife, Caroline Esther Rhodes (daughter of William Rhodes of Kirskill Hall, Yorkshire, and Bramhope Hall, Yorkshire). Together, they were the parents of:

- Hon. Maud Caroline Irby (1862–1873), who died young.
- Hon. Dorothy Gwenddolen Irby (1865–1865), who died young.

Lord Boston died on 22 December 1869, at age 67, at 12 Wilton Crescent, Belgravia, London. His will was proven, by probate, the following year on 6 May 1870, at under £35,000. He was succeeded in the barony by his only son, Florance. After his death in 1869, his widow, the dowager Baroness Boston, became a nun at The Ascension, Lavender Hill, London, of which she was the principal benefactor. She took the religious name of Mother Mary Caroline of the Benedictine Community of the Compassion of Jesus.

Peerage of Great Britain
Preceded by George Irby	Baron Boston; 1856–1869	Succeeded by Florance George Henry Irby
