= George Irby, 6th Baron Boston =

British scientist and politician (1860–1941)

The Right Honourable The Lord Boston DL FGS FSA
- Born: George Florance Irby; 6 September 1860; Taplow, Buckinghamshire
- Died: 16 September 1941 (aged 81)
- Education: Eton College; Christ Church, Oxford
- Political party: Conservative
- Spouse: Cecilia Constance Irby (m. 1890; died 1938)
- Parent(s): Florance Irby, 5th Baron Boston; Hon. Augusta Caroline Saumarez

George Florance Irby, 6th Baron Boston DL FGS FSA (6 September 1860 – 16 September 1941) was a British scientist and Conservative politician.

== Early life ==
George Florance Irby was born on 6 September 1860 at The Grange, Taplow, Buckinghamshire. He was the eldest son of Florance George Henry Irby, 5th Baron Boston, and the former Hon. Augusta Caroline Saumarez (1841–1929). After his father's death in 1877, his mother married Sir Henry Percy Anderson, Assistant Undersecretary for Foreign Affairs, in 1883.

His paternal grandparents were George Irby, 4th Baron Boston and Fanny Elizabeth Hopkins-Northey (a daughter of William Richard Hopkins-Northey of Oving House, Buckinghamshire). After the death of his grandmother, his paternal grandfather married his maternal aunt, Hon. Caroline Amelia Saumarez. Both his step-grandmother and mother were daughters of John Saumarez, 3rd Baron de Saumarez and, his first wife, Caroline Esther Rhodes (daughter of William Rhodes of Kirskill Hall, Yorkshire, and Bramhope Hall, Yorkshire).

He was educated at Eton and Christ Church, Oxford, receiving a Bachelor of Arts in 1882 and a Master of Arts in 1886.

== Career ==
On 4 January 1877 at the age of sixteen, he succeeded his father as the 6th Baron Boston, of Boston, Lincolnshire in the Peerage of Great Britain as well as the 7th Baronet Irby, of Whaplode and Boston, Lincolnshire in the Baronetage of Great Britain, later taking his seat on the Conservative benches in the House of Lords. Between 1885 and 1886 he served as a Lord-in-waiting (government whip in the House of Lords) in the short-lived Conservative administration of Lord Salisbury.

Lord Boston was also deeply interested in astronomy, botany, entomology and archaeology and was a Fellow of the Society of Antiquaries and of the Geological Society. He was also the first president of the Anglesey Antiquarian Society. In 1936 he was awarded an Honorary Doctorate of Law (LL.D.) by the University of Wales, Bangor for his services to culture. He also served as a Deputy Lieutenant of Anglesey.

== Personal life ==
On 13 March 1890 at Hedsor, Buckinghamshire, Lord Boston married his first cousin, once removed, Cecilia Constance Irby, daughter of Hon. Augustus Anthony Frederick Irby (a younger son of the 3rd Baron Boston) and Jessie Augusta Montgomery-Cuninghame (a daughter of Sir Thomas Montgomery-Cuninghame, 8th Baronet). The marriage was childless.

Lady Boston died in January 1938, aged 67. Lord Boston survived her by three years and died in September 1941, aged 81. He was succeeded in the barony by his nephew Greville.

Peerage of Great Britain
Preceded by Florance George Henry Irby	Baron Boston; 1877–1941	Succeeded by Greville Northey Irby
