= Baron Boston =

Barony in the Peerage of Great Britain

- Argent fretty sable on a canton gules a chaplet or
- Creation date: 10 April 1761
- Created by: King George III
- Peerage: Peerage of Great Britain
- First holder: Sir William Irby, 2nd Baronet
- Present holder: George Irby, 11th Baron Boston
- Heir apparent: Thomas Irby
- Status: Extant
- Former seats: Hedsor House; Plas Llanidan
- Motto: Honor fidelitatis præmium ("Honour is the reward of fidelity")

Baron Boston, of Boston in the County of Lincoln, is a title in the Peerage of Great Britain. It was created in 1761 for the court official and former member of parliament, Sir William Irby, 2nd Baronet. He had earlier represented Launceston and Bodmin in the House of Commons. He was the son of Edward Irby, Member of Parliament for Boston, who was created a baronet, of Whaplode and Boston in the County of Lincoln, in the Baronetage of England on 13 April 1704. Lord Boston's son, the second Baron, was a Lord of the Bedchamber to both George III and George IV. The title followed the line of his eldest son, the third Baron, until the death of the latter's great-great-grandson, the eighth Baron, in 1972. The late Baron was succeeded by his third cousin once removed, the ninth Baron. He was the great-grandson of Rear-Admiral Frederick Paul Irby, second son of the second Baron. Since 2007, the title is held by his grandson, the 11th Baron.

The family seat was Hedsor House, Hedsor, Buckinghamshire. The family also owned Plas Llanidan and land at Lligwy in Moelfre, Anglesey, Wales.

== Irby baronets, of Whaplode and Boston (1704) ==
- Sir Edward Irby, 1st Baronet (1676–1718)
- Sir William Irby, 2nd Baronet (1707–1775) (created Baron Boston in 1761)

== Barons Boston (1761) ==
- William Irby, 1st Baron Boston (1707–1775)
- Frederick Irby, 2nd Baron Boston (1749–1825), father of Admiral Frederick Irby
- George Irby, 3rd Baron Boston (1777–1856)
- George Ives Irby, 4th Baron Boston (1802–1869)
- Florance George Henry Irby, 5th Baron Boston (1837–1877)
- George Florance Irby, 6th Baron Boston (1860–1941)
- Greville Northey Irby, 7th Baron Boston (1889–1958)
- Cecil Eustace Irby, 8th Baron Boston (1897–1972)
- Gerald Howard Boteler Irby, 9th Baron Boston (1897–1978)
- Timothy George Frank Boteler Irby, 10th Baron Boston (1939–2007)
- George William Eustace Boteler Irby, 11th Baron Boston (born 1971)

The heir apparent is the present holder's son, the Hon. Thomas William George Boteler Irby (born 1998).

== See also ==
- Boston, Lincolnshire
- Whaplode
- Viscount Boston
- Baron Boston of Faversham
