= George Irby, 3rd Baron Boston =

English peer and landowner (1777–1856)

Major The Right Honourable The Lord Boston
- Born: George Irby; 27 December 1777; Mayfair, London
- Died: 12 March 1856 (aged 78); Hedsor House, Buckinghamshire
- Education: Eton College; Oxford University
- Spouse: Rachel Ives Drake (m. 1801; died 1830)
- Children: 10, including George
- Parent(s): Frederick Irby, 2nd Baron Boston; Christian Methuen
- Relatives: William Irby, 1st Baron Boston (grandfather)

Major George Irby, 3rd Baron Boston (27 December 1777 – 12 March 1856) was an English peer and landowner.

== Early life ==
George Irby was born on 9 June 1749 at Grosvenor Street, Mayfair, London. For his baptism on 28 January 1778, his sponsor was King George III (for whom his father served as Lord of the Bedchamber). He was the eldest son, of thirteen children, born to the former Christian Methuen and Frederick Irby, 2nd Baron Boston. Among his siblings were Rear-Admiral Hon. Frederick Paul Irby (who married George's sister-in-law, Emily Ives Drake), Hon. Charles Leonard Irby (who travelled to the Middle East and married Frances Mangles), and the Hon. Anne Maria Louisa Irby (who married Henry Peachey, 3rd Baron Selsey), among others.

His paternal grandparents were William Irby, 1st Baron Boston, and Albinia Selwyn (a sister of William Selwyn, MP for Whitchurch). His paternal aunt, Hon. Augusta Georgina Elizabeth Irby, married Thomas de Grey, 2nd Baron Walsingham. His maternal grandparents were Paul Methuen, MP for Westbury, Warwick, and Great Bedwyn, and Catharine Cobb of Corsham Court, Wiltshire. His maternal uncle, Paul Cobb Methuen, was the father of Paul Methuen, 1st Baron Methuen.

He was educated at Eton College, and graduated from Oxford University with a Doctor of Civil Laws.

== Career ==
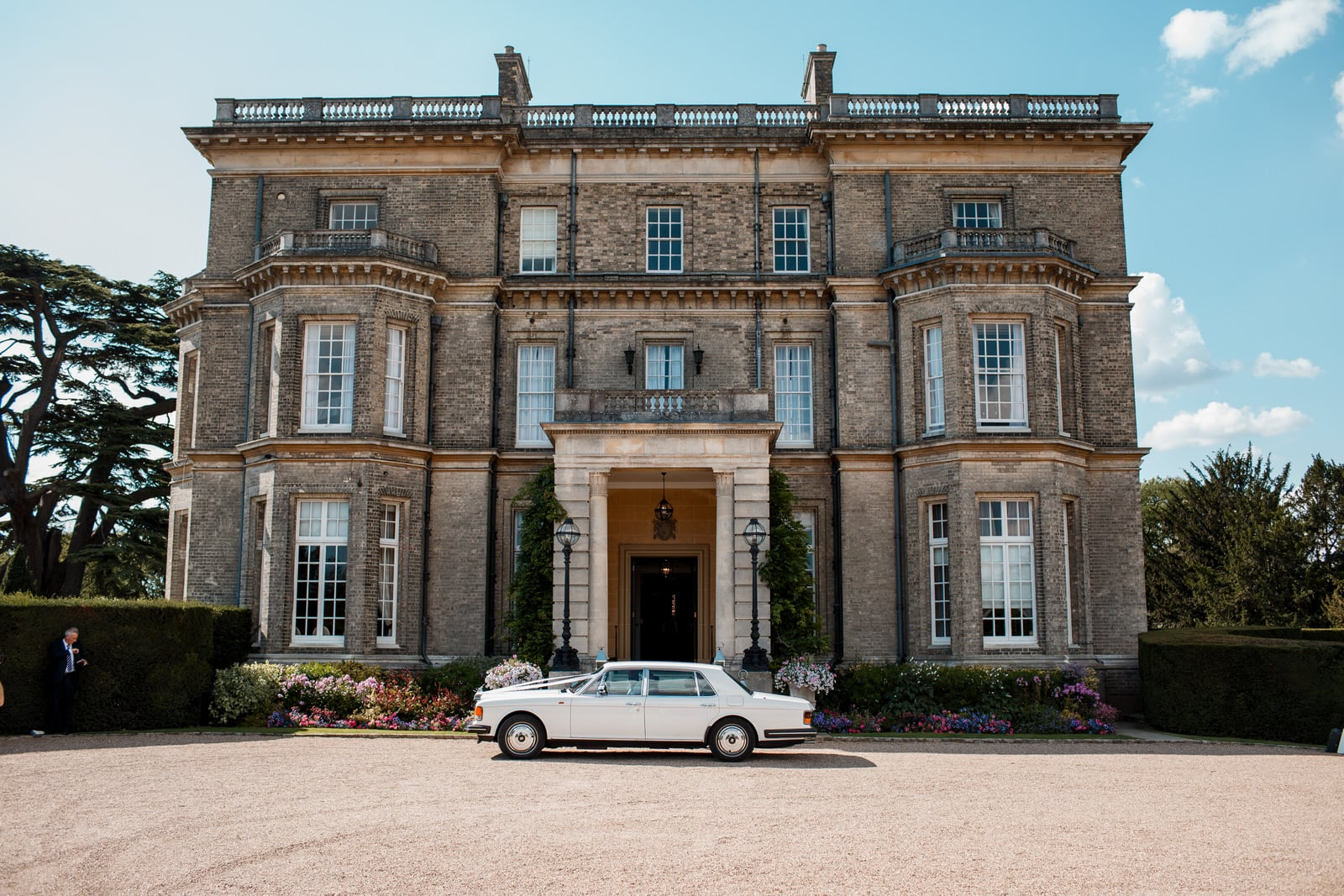
Hedsor House, in Hedsor, Buckinghamshire

Irby entered the British Army, purchasing a cornet in the 1st Dragoons on the 4 March 1794. He was promoted to major in the 13th Light Dragoons on 22 January 1801 before he retired on 14 August 1801.

Upon the death of his father on 23 March 1825, he succeeded as the 3rd Baron Boston, of Boston, Lincolnshire in the Peerage of Great Britain, as well as the 4th Baronet Irby, of Whaplode and Boston, Lincolnshire in the Baronetage of Great Britain.

== Personal life ==
On 17 October 1801 at Catton, Norfolk, Irby married Rachel Ives Drake (1783–1830), daughter of William Drake, MP for Amersham, and Rachel Elizabeth Ives. Her sister, Emily Ives Drake, was the first wife of his brother, Frederick Paul Irby. Together, they were the parents of:

- George Ives Irby, 4th Baron Boston (1802–1869), who married Fanny Elizabeth Hopkins-Northey, daughter of William Richard Hopkins-Northey and Anne Elizabeth Fortescue, in 1830. After her death, he married Hon. Caroline Amelia Saumarez, daughter of John Saumarez, 3rd Baron de Saumarez and Caroline Esther Rhodes, in 1861.
- Hon. Rachel Emily Irby (1805–1873), who married Capt. William Jones Prowse in 1840.
- Hon. Charlotte Isabella Irby (1807–1883), who married Thomas FitzMaurice, 5th Earl of Orkney, son of John FitzMaurice, Viscount Kirkwall and Hon. Anna Maria de Blaquiere (a daughter of the 1st Baron de Blaquiere), in 1826.
- Hon. William Drake Irby (1808–1839), a captain with the 1st Dragoon Guards; he died unmarried.
- Hon. Frances Matilda Irby (1810–1879)
- Hon. Frederica Maria Louisa Irby (1814–1885), who married Edward Horatio Hussey, 21st Baron Galtrim, son of Edward Thomas Hussey, 20th Baron Galtrim, and Anne Frances Bacon (a daughter of Sir Edmund Bacon, 8th Baronet), in 1840.
- Hon. Georgina Albinia Irby (1816–1900), who died unmarried.
- Hon. Catherine Cecilia Irby (1818–1894), who married Col. Walter Caulfeild Pratt, son of Col. Joseph Pratt and Jemima Roberta Tynte (a daughter of Sir James Tynte, 1st Baronet), in 1852.
- Hon. Augustus Anthony Frederick Irby (1820–1870), who married Jessie Augusta Montgomery-Cuninghame, daughter of Sir Thomas Montgomery-Cuninghame, 8th Baronet and Charlotte Niven Doig Hutcheson, in 1866.
- Hon. Llewellyn Charles Robert Irby (1822–1911), the rector at Whiston, Northamptonshire; he married Margaret Emily Bullock, daughter of Jonathan Bullock of Faulkbourne Hall, Essex, in 1845.

Lord Boston died on 12 March 1856 at Hedsor House, Buckinghamshire. He was succeeded in the barony by his eldest son, George.

=== Drake-Ives inheritance ===
His wife Rachel and her sister, Emily, each inherited one half of their maternal grandfather Jeremiah Ives's property, including the Manors of Boyland (including Boyland Hall) and Fritton, as well as Drake's property in Boyland, Fritton, Hempnall, Morningthorpe, Stratton St. Mary and St. Michael, Long Stratton and Tasburgh; Drake's messuage in Flixton and land in Flixton and Gunton, Suffolk; Drake's house 'The White House' and land in Blundeston; Drake's messuage and land in Corton, Suffolk; Drake's messuage in Amersham in Buckinghamshire, formerly part of the George Inn; property in Amersham, Chesham and Woburn, including Chartridge Farm in Chesham and Woburn; property formerly of Jeremiah Ives as described in 1781 Drake-Ives settlement.

Peerage of Great Britain
Preceded by Frederick Irby	Baron Boston; 1825–1856	Succeeded by George Ives Irby
