= John Saumarez, 3rd Baron de Saumarez =

British soldier and artist (1806–1891)

The Right Honourable The Lord de Saumarez
- Born: John St Vincent Saumarez; 28 May 1806
- Died: 8 January 1891 (aged 84)
- Spouse(s): Caroline Esther Rhodes (m. 1838; died 1846) Margaret Antoinette Northey (m. 1850; died 1891)
- Children: 8, including James
- Parent(s): James Saumarez, 1st Baron de Saumarez; Martha Le Marchant
- Relatives: George Irby, 6th Baron Boston (grandson); Thomas Saumarez (uncle); Richard Saumarez (uncle)

Colonel John St Vincent Saumarez, 3rd Baron de Saumarez (Note: Saumarez is pronounced "Sommeray".) (28 May 1806 – 8 January 1891) was a British soldier and artist.

== Early life ==
John St. Vincent Saumarez was born on 28 May 1806. He was the third son of Admiral James Saumarez, 1st Baron de Saumarez and Martha Le Marchant (d. 1849). Through his mother, the estate now known as Saumarez Park came into the family. His elder brothers were the Rev. James Saumarez (who married Mary Lechmere, daughter of Vice-Admiral William Lechmere), and Thomas Le Marchant Saumarez (who married Catherine Spencer Alicia Beresford Vassall, daughter of Lt.-Col. Spencer Thomas Vassall).

His paternal grandparents were Matthew de Sausmarez and, his second wife, Carteret Le Marchant (a daughter of James Le Marchant). Among his paternal family were uncles, General Sir Thomas Saumarez (Equerry and Groom of the Chamber to the Duke of Kent), and Dr. Richard Saumarez. His aunt married Henry Brock, making him a first cousin of Maj.-Gen. Sir Isaac Brock and Daniel de Lisle Brock. His maternal grandparents, also from Guernsey, Thomas Le Marchant and Mary (née Dobrée) Le Marchant (sister to Mary Dobrée, who married Sir Peter de Havilland, both daughters of merchant Peter Dobrée).

== Career ==
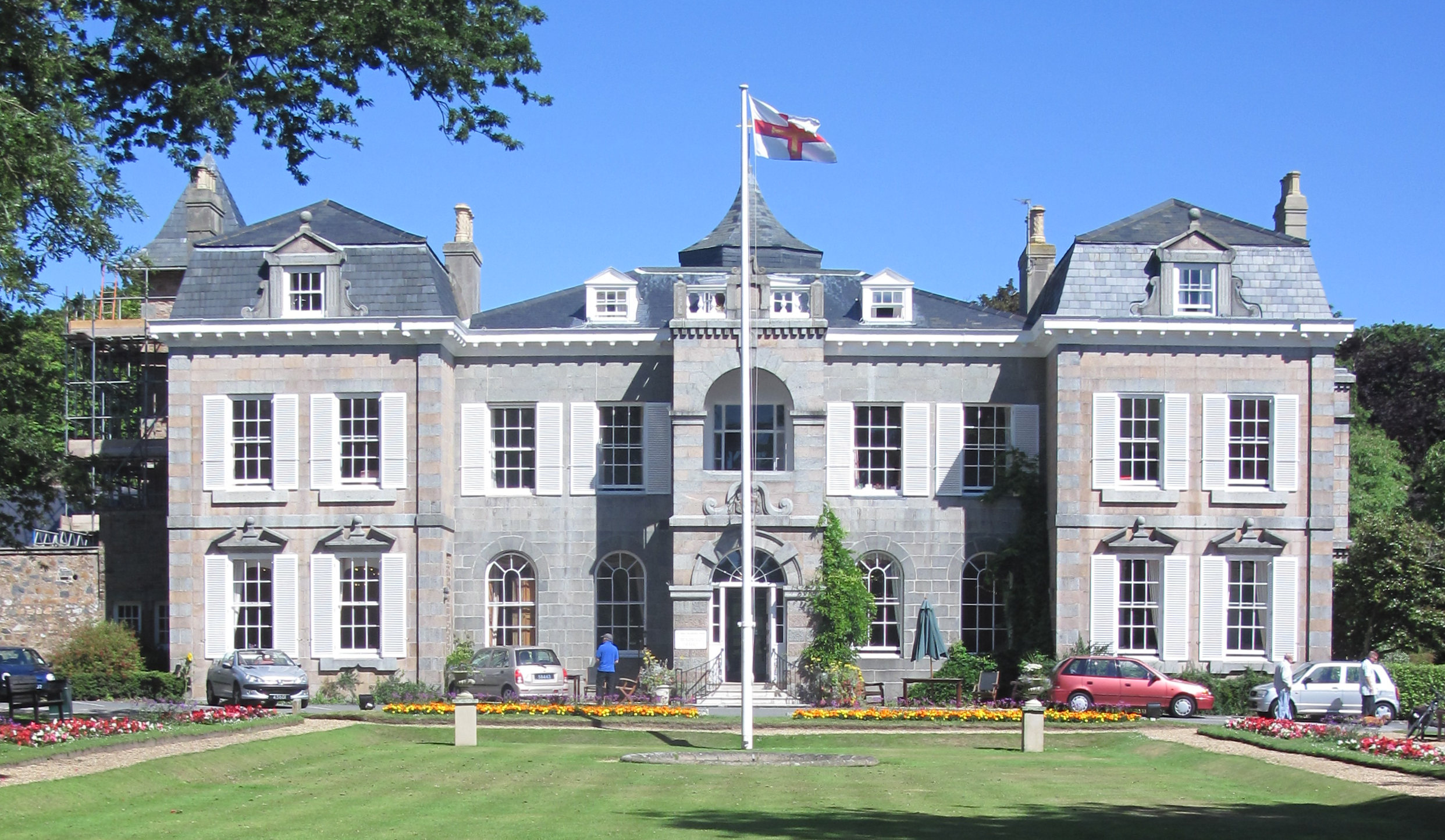
Saumarez Park Manor

Of the three sons of the 1st Baron de Saumarez, he was the only to have issue. Upon the death of his elder brother, clergyman James on 9 April 1863, he succeeded as the 3rd Baron de Saumarez, in the Island of Guernsey in the Peerage of the United Kingdom, as well as the 3rd Baronet Saumarez, in the Island of Guernsey in the Baronetage of the United Kingdom.

He served as a colonel in the British Army, Light Brigade.

In 1869, after Lord de Saumarez put his Guernsey property up for sale, his eldest son, James exercised his droit de retraite (right of redemption) to buy Saumarez Park and the Le Guet estate at Castel there.

== Personal life ==
On 2 June 1838 at the British Embassy in Paris, he married Caroline Esther Rhodes (1818–1846), daughter of William Rhodes of Kirskill Hall, Yorkshire, and Bramhope Hall, Yorkshire. While in London, they lived at 41, Prince's Gate, South Kensington. Before her death on 15 July 1846, they were the parents of two sons and two daughters:

- Hon. Caroline Amelia Saumarez (1839–1922), who married, as his second wife, George Irby, 4th Baron Boston, son of George Irby, 3rd Baron Boston, in 1861. After his death in 1869, she became a nun at The Ascension, Lavender Hill, London, of which she was the principal benefactor. She took the religious name of Mother Mary Caroline of the Benedictine Community of the Compassion of Jesus.
- Hon. Augusta Caroline Saumarez (1841–1929), who married Florance Irby, 5th Baron Boston, son of George Irby, 4th Baron Boston and, his first wife Fanny Elizabeth Hopkins-Northey, in 1859. After his death in 1877, she married Sir Henry Percy Anderson, Assistant Undersecretary for Foreign Affairs, in 1883.
- James St. Vincent Saumarez, 4th Baron de Saumarez (1843–1937), a career diplomat who married heiress Jane Anne Vere-Broke, daughter of Capt. Charles Acton Vere-Broke and Anna Maria Hamilton (a daughter of John Hamilton of Sundrum), in 1882.
- Hon. John St. Vincent Saumarez (1845–1877), a Captain in the 14th Hussars who died unmarried.

On 13 April 1850, he married Margaret Antoinette Northey (d. 1904), fourth daughter of William Richard Hopkyns Northey of Oving House, Buckinghamshire. Together, they were the parents of another two sons and two daughters:

- Hon. Arthur Saumarez (1852–1933), the private secretary to the 1st Earl of Iddesleigh; he married Hon. Edith Mary McGarel-Hogg, daughter of James McGarel-Hogg, 1st Baron Magheramorne and Hon. Caroline Douglas-Pennant (a daughter of the 1st Baron Penrhyn), in 1881.
- Hon. Antoinette Elizabeth Saumarez (1854–1918), who married Piers Egerton-Warburton, son of Rowland Egerton-Warburton and Mary Brooke (eldest daughter of Sir Richard Brooke, 6th Baronet of Norton Priory), in 1880.
- Hon. Gerald Le Marchant Saumarez (1859–1941), who died unmarried.
- Hon. Eleanor Mary Saumarez (1863–1937), who married Rev. Charles J. Walbrand Evans, Rector at Burstow, Surrey, in 1903.

Lord Saumarez died on 8 January 1881, at age 74, and was buried at Brompton Cemetery in London. He was succeeded in the barony by his eldest son, James. His widow, the dowager Lady de Saumarez, died on 10 May 1904.

=== Descendants ===
Through his daughter Augusta, he was a grandfather of the scientist and Conservative politician, George Irby, 6th Baron Boston (1860–1941).

== Notes ==
Peerage of the United Kingdom
Preceded by James Saumarez	Baron de Saumarez; 1863–1891	Succeeded by James St Vincent Saumarez
