= Irby =

Irby may refer to:

== People ==
- Irby (given name), a list of people
- Irby (surname), a list of people

== Places ==
- Irby, Merseyside, England, a village
- Irby, Virginia, United States, an unincorporated community
- Irby, Washington, United States, an unincorporated community
- Irby in the Marsh, Lincolnshire, England
- Irby upon Humber, Lincolnshire, England

== Other uses ==
- "Irby", the tune to Once in Royal David's City written by Henry Gauntlett

== See also ==
- Irbyville
