= William Irby, 1st Baron Boston =

British peer and Member of Parliament (1707-1775)

The Right Honourable The Lord Boston
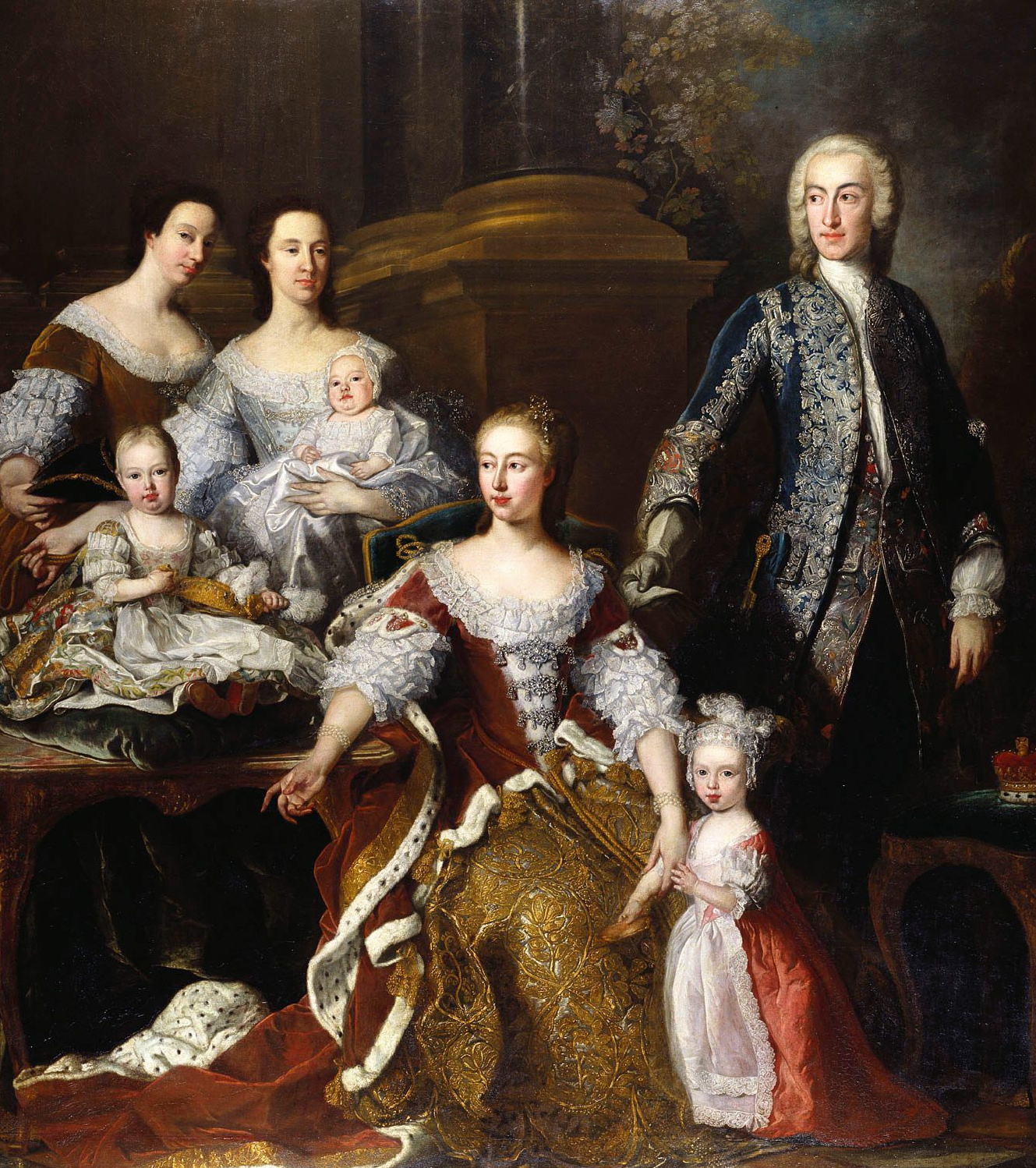
- Augusta, Princess of Wales, with her family and Sir William Irby, standing at the right

Member of Parliament for Bodmin
- In office 1747–1761 Serving with John LaRoche, George Hunt
- Preceded by: John LaRoche; Thomas Bludworth
- Succeeded by: George Hunt; John Parker

Member of Parliament for Old Sarum
- In office 1747–1747 Serving with Thomas Pitt
- Preceded by: William Pitt; Edward Willes
- Succeeded by: Earl of Middlesex; The Viscount Doneraile

Member of Parliament for Launceston
- In office 1735–1747 Serving with Sir William Morice, Bt
- Preceded by: John King; Sir William Morice, Bt
- Succeeded by: Sir William Morice, Bt; Sir John St Aubyn, Bt

Personal details
- Born: William Irby; 8 March 1707
- Died: 30 March 1775 (aged 68)
- Spouse: Albinia Selwyn (m. 1746; died 1769)
- Children: Augusta de Grey, Baroness Walsingham; Frederick Irby, 2nd Baron Boston; Hon. William Henry Irby
- Parent(s): Sir Edward Irby, 1st Baronet; Dorothy Paget
- Education: Westminster School

William Irby, 1st Baron Boston (8 March 1707 – 30 March 1775), known as Sir William Irby, 2nd Baronet from 1718 to 1761, was a British peer and Member of Parliament.

== Early life ==
Irby was born on 8 March 1707. He was the only son of Sir Edward Irby, 1st Baronet (1676–1718) and Dorothy Paget (d. c. 1734).

His paternal grandparents were Anthony Irby (heir of Sir Anthony Irby) and the former Mary Stringer (a daughter of John Stringer of Ashford, Kent). His maternal grandparents were Hon. Henry Paget (second son of the 5th Baron Paget) and the former Mary O'Rorke (a daughter of Col. Hugh O'Rorke, High Sheriff of Leitrim). His maternal uncle was Brig.-Gen. Thomas Paget, the Governor of Menorca. Through him, he was a first cousin of Caroline Paget, who married Sir Nicholas Bayly, 2nd Baronet in 1737.

On the death of his father on 11 November 1718, he succeeded as the 2nd Baronet Irby, of Whaplode and Boston, Lincolnshire in the Baronetage of Great Britain. After inheriting the baronetcy, he attended Westminster School from 1719 to 1722.

== Career ==
Irby served as a Page of Honour to King George I and King George II in the final and first few years of their reigns, respectively. He was also an equerry to Frederick, Prince of Wales from 1728 to 1736, Vice-Chamberlain to the Prince's wife, Augusta from 1736 to 1751 and her Lord Chamberlain from 1751 to 1772.

Irby was also Member of Parliament for Launceston from 1735 to 1747, for Old Sarum in 1747, and for Bodmin from 1747 to 1761.

In 1743, he inherited the unsettled estates of his cousin, Henry Paget, 1st Earl of Uxbridge. (Note: Henry Paget, 1st Earl of Uxbridge (1663–1743), was the only surviving son of William Paget, 6th Baron Paget (his maternal grandfather's elder brother), and, his first wife, Frances Pierrepont. After Frances, Lady Paget (née Pierrepont) died in 1681, the 6th Baron Paget married Isabella Irby, a daughter of the first Baron Boston's great-grandfather, Sir Anthony Irby, and Hon. Catherine Paget (third daughter of the 4th Baron Paget).) In 1761 he was raised to the peerage as Baron Boston, of Boston in the County of Lincoln, and became Lord of the manor of Hedsor, Buckinghamshire, in 1764. Between 1770 and 1775, he served as Chairman of the Committees of the House of Lords.

== Personal life ==
On 26 August 1746, he married Albinia Selwyn (1719–1769), a daughter of Henry Selwyn, the Receiver-General of Customs, and Ruth Compton (a daughter of Anthony Compton of Gainslaw, near Berwick-on-Tweed, Northumberland). Among Albinia's siblings was William Selwyn, MP for Whitchurch. His wife served as Maid of Honour to Augusta, Princess of Wales. Together, they had three children:

- Hon. Augusta Georgina Elizabeth Irby (1747–1818), who married Thomas de Grey, 2nd Baron Walsingham, son of Chief Justice William de Grey, 1st Baron Walsingham and Mary Cowper, in 1772.
- Frederick Irby, 2nd Baron Boston (1749–1825), who married Christian Methuen, daughter of Catharine Cobb and Paul Methuen of Corsham Court, MP for Westbury, Warwick, and Great Bedwyn). in 1775.
- Hon. William Henry Irby (1750–1830), who married Mary Blackman, younger daughter and co-heiress of Rowland Blackman of Bath and Antigua and Priscilla (née Warren) Blackman, in 1781.

Lord Boston died on 30 March 1775, aged 68 and was buried in Whiston, Northamptonshire. He was succeeded in the barony by his eldest son, Frederick.

=== Descendants ===
Through his only daughter Augusta, he was a grandfather of Lt.-Gen. George de Grey, 3rd Baron Walsingham and Thomas de Grey, 4th Baron Walsingham, the Archdeacon of Winchester and Archdeacon of Surrey.

Through his son Frederick, he was a grandfather of George Irby, 3rd Baron Boston, Rear-Admiral Hon. Frederick Paul Irby, and Capt. Hon. Charles Leonard Irby, Anne Maria Louisa Irby (who married Henry Peachey, 3rd Baron Selsey).

Through his youngest son William, he was a grandfather of Augusta Priscilla Irby, who married Sir William Langham, 8th Baronet, and William Henry Rowland Irby, who attended Eton and St John's College, Oxford.

== Notes ==
Court offices
| Preceded by Thomas Murray | Page of Honour; 1724–1731 | Succeeded by Henry d'Arcy |
Parliament of Great Britain
| Preceded by John King; Sir William Morice, Bt | Member of Parliament for Launceston; 1735–1747; With: Sir William Morice, Bt | Succeeded by Sir William Morice, Bt; Sir John St Aubyn, Bt |
| Preceded by William Pitt; Edward Willes | Member of Parliament for Old Sarum; 1747; With: Thomas Pitt | Succeeded by Earl of Middlesex; The Viscount Doneraile |
| Preceded by John LaRoche; Thomas Bludworth | Member of Parliament for Bodmin; 1747–1761; With: John LaRoche 1747–1752; George Hunt 1753–1761 | Succeeded by George Hunt; John Parker |
Peerage of Great Britain
| New creation | Baron Boston; 1761–1775 | Succeeded by Frederick Irby |
Baronetage of England
| Preceded by Edward Irby | Baronet (of Whaplode and Boston); 1718–1775 | Succeeded by Frederick Irby |
