= Hitcham War Memorial =

War memorial in Hitcham, Buckinghamshire, England

Coordinates: 51.534377°N 0.674922°W

Hitcham War Memorial is located outside St Mary's Church, Hitcham Lane, Hitcham, Buckinghamshire, England. It is a grade II listed building with Historic England and commemorates men who died in the First and Second World Wars.
