= Whaplode Drove =

Village in Lincolnshire, England

Coordinates: 52.7021°N 0.0479°W

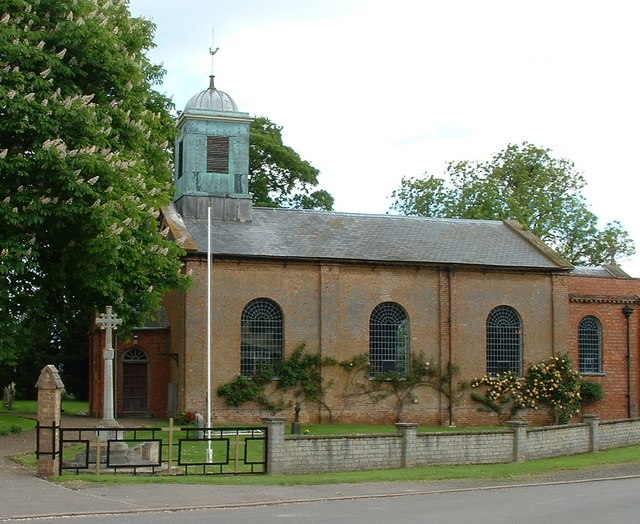
- Whaplode Drove church

- Location within Lincolnshire
- OS grid reference: TF319133
  - London: 80 mi (130 km) S
- District: South Holland
- Shire county: Lincolnshire
- Region: East Midlands
- Country: England
- Sovereign state: United Kingdom
- Post town: SPALDING
- Postcode district: PE12
- Dialling code: 01406
- Police: Lincolnshire
- Fire: Lincolnshire
- Ambulance: East Midlands
- UK Parliament: South Holland and The Deepings

Whaplode Drove is a village in the civil parish of Whaplode, in the South Holland district of Lincolnshire, England. It is approximately 10 miles (16 km) south from the market town of Spalding. The hamlet of Shepeau Stow is 1 mile (1.6 km) to the south-west.

Whaplode Drove is a largely rural village and lies in the middle of the Lincolnshire Fens.

The name 'Whaplode' derives from the Old English cwappa-lad meaning 'eel pout watercourse'.

== Community ==
Village amenities include a post office with shop, a church, garage, a social club and, a Red Bus Travelling Fish and Chips shop.

The ecclesiastical parish is Whaplode Drove. The parish church, on Broadgate, is dedicated to St John the Baptist. The parish is part of the Whaplode Drove Group of the Deanery of Elloe East. The only other parish in the group is Gedney Hill.

The church maintains a church hall, and the village also has a war memorial, and The Elizabethan centre, a community hall intended to commemorate the coronation of Queen Elizabeth II, but which took until 1982 to be built.

Whaplode Drove have a local football team, Whaplode Drove Rovers, Established in 2022 by father-son duo Al Lenihan and Danny Lenihan. They currently play in the PDFL Peterborough Premier Division, their home ground is at the Elizabethan Centre.
