= D'Arcy Wentworth Thompson (Galway) =

Irish classical scholar, linguist and philosopher

- Born: 18 April 1829; At sea, off Van Diemen's Land
- Died: 25 January 1902 (aged 72); Galway, Ireland
- Occupations: Scholar, classicist, academic
- Known for: Professor of Greek at Queen's College, Galway
- Title: Professor of Greek

Academic background
- Education: Christ's Hospital, London; Trinity College, Cambridge; Pembroke College, Cambridge
- Academic advisors: Augustus Arthur Vansittart; Joseph Barber Lightfoot

Academic work
- Notable students: Robert Louis Stevenson

D'Arcy Wentworth Thompson (1829–1902) was an English scholar, from 1863 Professor of Greek at Queen's College, Galway.

== Life ==
D'Arcy was the elder son of John Skelton Thompson, shipmaster, and his wife Mary Mitchell, both of Maryport, Cumberland; it was a seafaring family, and he was born at sea on board his father's barque Georgiana, off Van Diemen's Land, on 18 April 1829. After twelve years (1835–47) at Christ's Hospital, London, he matriculated at Trinity College, Cambridge, Michaelmas 1848, later migrating to Pembroke College. At Cambridge his main tutors were Augustus Arthur Vansittart and with Joseph Barber Lightfoot, both of Trinity; his closest friends were James Lempriere Hammond and Peter Guthrie Tait. He was placed sixth in the first class in the Classical Tripos of 1852, bracketed with William Jackson Brodribb.

After graduating B.A. in 1852, Thompson became classical master at the Edinburgh Academy, where Robert Louis Stevenson was one of his pupils. During this period he lived at 3 Brandon Street a short distance east of the school.

In 1863 he took the chair of Greek in Queen's College, Galway. In 1867 he delivered the Lowell lectures in Boston. He died at Galway on 25 January 1902, a few hours after lecturing on Thucydides.

== Works ==
At Cambridge, Thompson gained a medal for Latin verse in 1849 with an ode Maurorum in Hispania Imperium. His major work Day Dreams of a Schoolmaster (Edinburgh, 1864, 1865) is partly autobiographical, and argued for sensitive teaching of Latin and Greek, broader female education, and the dignity of the teaching profession. He wrote also:

- Ancient Leaves (1862), translated and original poems;
- Wayside Thoughts of an Asophophilosopher (1865), essays;
- Wayside Thoughts (1867), his Lowell lectures, related to the content of Day Dreams; and
- Sales Attici. (1867), maxims from Greek tragedy.

For his eldest son, Thompson wrote children's books illustrated by Charles H. Bennett, Nursery Nonsense, or Rhymes without Reason (1863–4), and Fun and Earnest, or Rhymes with Reason (1865). He wrote essays and poems in The Scotsman and Macmillan's Magazine, and sent translations from the Greek to The Museum.

== Family ==
Thompson married twice: (1) in Edinburgh, in 1859, Fanny Gamgee (1840–1860), daughter of Joseph Gamgee and sister of Joseph Sampson Gamgee with whom he had one son, D'Arcy Wentworth Thompson the biologist; and (2) in Dublin, in 1866, Agnes Emma (Amy), daughter of William Barker Drury, of Boden Park, Co. Dublin, by whom he had two sons and four daughters.
