= Ireby =

Ireby may refer to:

- Ireby, Cumbria, England
- Ireby, Lancashire, England

== See also ==
- Irby (disambiguation)
