= St Mary of Debre Tsion, Battersea =

Church in Battersea, London

Coordinates: 51.4705°N 0.1511°W

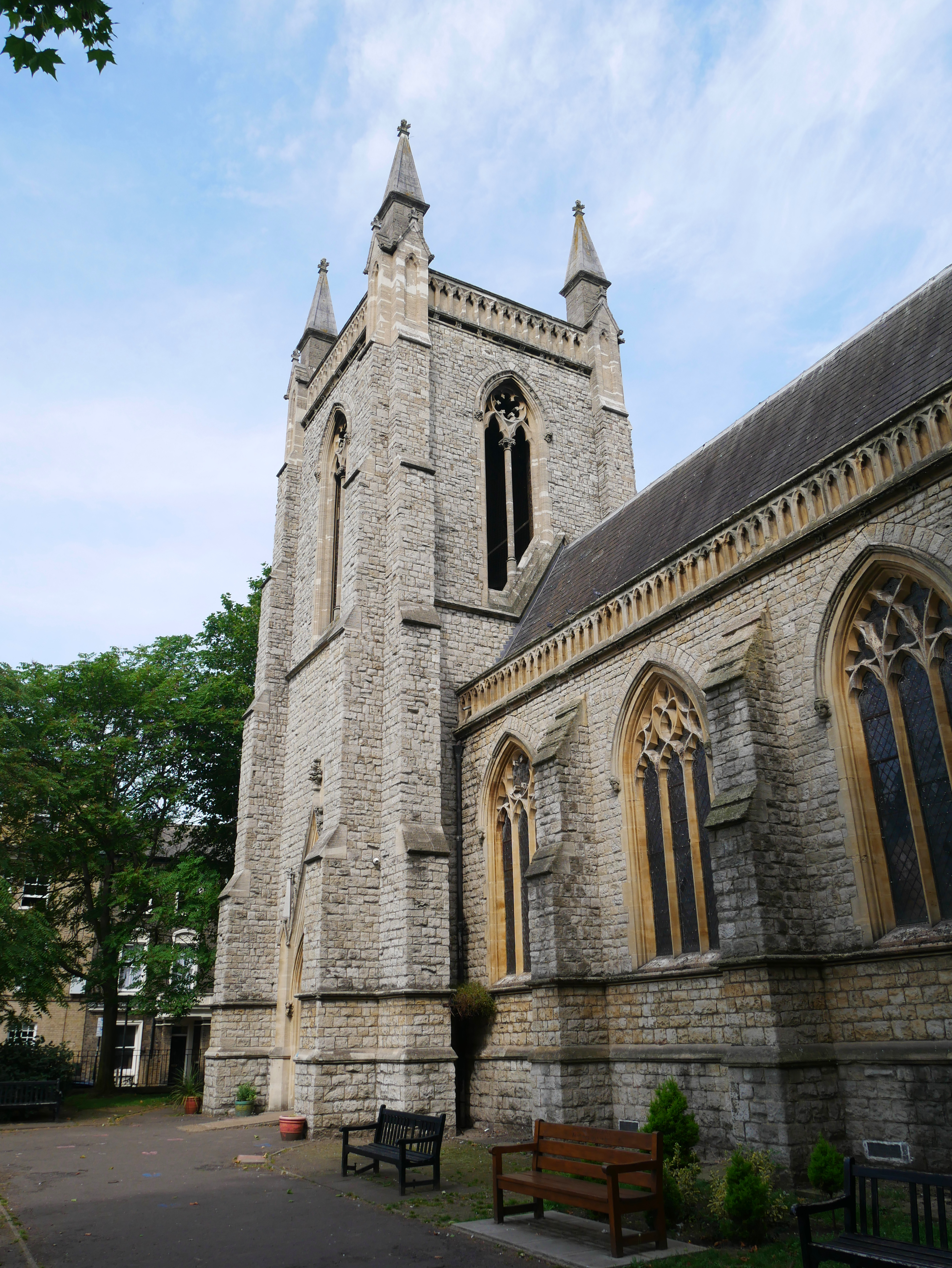
St Mary of Debre Tsion, Battersea

St Mary of Debre Tsion, Battersea is a church in Battersea, South London affiliated with the Ethiopian Orthodox Tewahedo Church. It was formerly known as the Church of Saint Philip when run under the administration of the Church of England.

== History ==
The church, which was designed by Sir James Knowles for the Park Town Estate and built by Colls & Sons, opened as St Philip's Church in 1870. It amalgamated with the parish of St Bartholomew, Wickersley Road, in 1972 and then amalgamated with The Ascension, Lavender Hill in 2000. The church is Grade II listed. When it was an Anglican church, it had a William Hill & Sons organ; in 1992 this was removed and reinstalled in the chapel at Reading School by Bower & Co.

The church was rented out to the Ethiopian Orthodox Tewahedo Church from the early 2000s, declared redundant by the Church of England in 2007 and acquired by the Ethiopian Orthodox Tewahedo Church in 2010. It was renamed St Mary of Debre Tsion, Battersea after the Monastery of Mount Zion (Monastery of Debre Tsion in Ge'ez language), located on Tulu Gudo Island on Lake Zway in Ethiopia.
