= Irby (given name) =

Although more commonly a surname, Irby is also a given name. Notable people with the surname include:

- Irby Brown (1928—2016), American painter
- Irby Curry (1894–1918), American football quarterback
- Irby Koffman (1899–1968), American football coach
- Edith Irby Jones (1927–2019), American physician
- Francis Irby Gwaltney (1921–1981), American author
- George Irby Redditt (1863–1953), Democratic member of the Mississippi House of Representatives

== See also ==
- Irby (surname) for people with the surname Irby
