= Frederick Irby, 2nd Baron Boston =

English landowner and courtier (1749-1825)

The Right Honourable The Lord Boston FSA
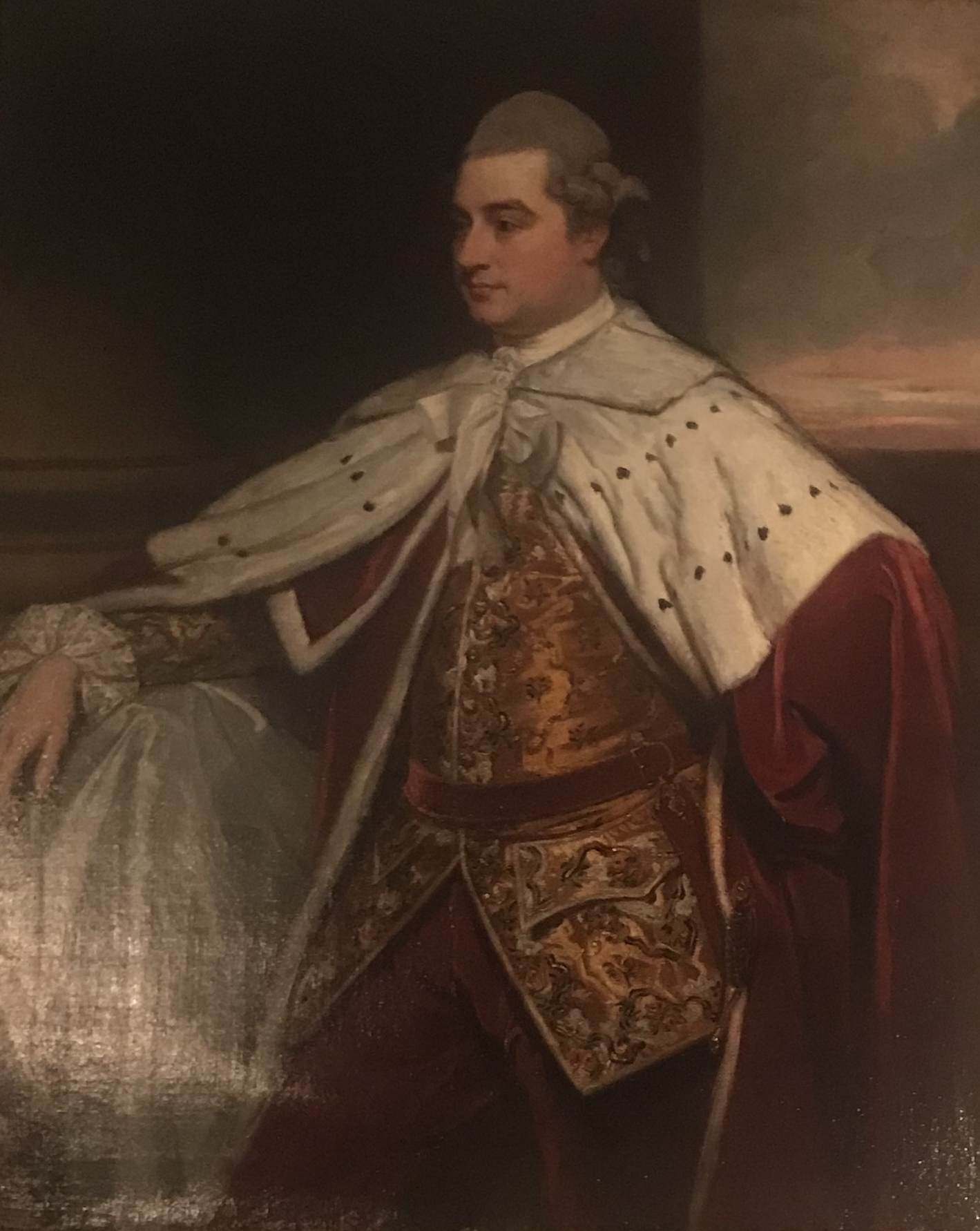
- Portrait by George Romney, c. 1790
- Born: Frederick Irby; 9 June 1749
- Died: 23 March 1825 (aged 75); Mayfair, London
- Education: Eton College
- Alma mater: Oxford University; St. John's College, Cambridge
- Spouse: Christiana Methuen (m. 1775; died 1825)
- Parent(s): William Irby, 1st Baron Boston; Albinia Selwyn
- Relatives: Sir Edward Irby, 1st Baronet (grandfather)

Frederick Irby, 2nd Baron Boston, FSA (9 June 1749 – 23 March 1825) was an English landowner and courtier.

== Early life ==
Frederick Irby was born on 9 June 1749. He was the eldest son of William Irby, 1st Baron Boston, and Albinia Selwyn. His elder sister, Hon. Augusta Georgina Elizabeth Irby, married Thomas de Grey, 2nd Baron Walsingham. His younger brother, Hon. William Henry Irby, married Mary Blackman (co-heiress of Rowland Blackman of Bath and Antigua).

His paternal grandparents were Sir Edward Irby, 1st Baronet and the former Dorothy Paget (a granddaughter of the 5th Baron Paget). His maternal grandparents were Henry Selwyn, the Receiver-General of Customs, and Ruth Compton (a daughter of Anthony Compton of Gainslaw, near Berwick-on-Tweed, Northumberland). His maternal uncle was William Selwyn, MP for Whitchurch.

He was educated at Eton College and graduated from Oxford University on 8 July 1763 with a Doctor of Civil Laws (D.C.L.), and from St. John's College, Cambridge, in 1769 with a Master of Arts (M.A.).

== Career ==
Upon the death of his father on 30 March 1775, he succeeded as the 2nd Baron Boston, of Boston, Lincolnshire in the Peerage of Great Britain, as well as the 3rd Baronet Irby, of Whaplode and Boston, Lincolnshire in the Baronetage of Great Britain.

In 1778, Irby built a new mansion at his estate at Hedsor House, near Taplow, Buckinghamshire. An engraving of the manor, by his brother-in-law Archdeacon John Gooch, is now in the British Museum.

An amateur etcher, Irby was invested as a Fellow of the Society of Antiquaries on 8 January 1778.

In later life he was a courtier, holding the office of Lord of the Bedchamber to both George III and George IV, from 1780 until his death in 1825. King George III was godfather to Irby’s oldest son and heir, George, at his baptism on 28 January 1778.

== Personal life ==
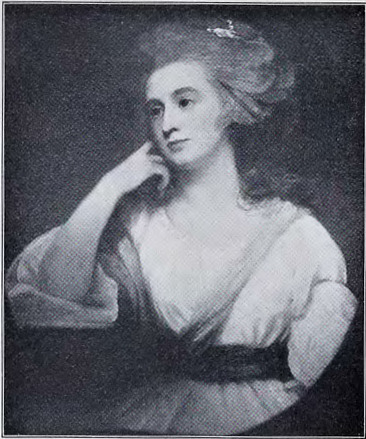
Christiana, Lady Boston, portrait by George Romney

On 15 May 1775, Lord Boston married Christiana Methuen (d. 1832), a daughter of Paul Methuen, MP for Westbury, Warwick, and Great Bedwyn, and Catharine Cobb of Corsham Court, Wiltshire. Her brother, Paul Cobb Methuen, was the father of Paul Methuen, 1st Baron Methuen. Together, they were the parents of thirteen children, including:

- Hon. Charlotte Irby (1776–1848), who died unmarried.
- George Irby, 3rd Baron Boston (1777–1856), who married Rachel Ives Drake, daughter of William Drake, MP for Amersham, and Rachel Elizabeth Ives, in 1801.
- Hon. Frederick Paul Irby (1779–1844), a Rear-Admiral who married Emily Ives Drake, also a daughter of William Drake, in 1803. After her death, he married Frances Wright, daughter of Ichabod Wright and Harriet Maria Day, in 1816.
- Hon. William Augustus Irby (1780–1807), a Reverend who died unmarried.
- Hon. Albinia Irby (1782–1839), a spinster who died at Ostallgäu, Germany.
- Hon. Henry Edward Irby (1783–1821), a Lt.-Col. in the 2nd Life Guards who fought at the Battle of Waterloo and died with the 1st West India Regiment.
- Hon. Paul Anthony Irby (1784–1865), the Vicar of Cottesbrooke; he married Patience Anne Champion de Crespigny, daughter of Sir William Champion de Crespigny, 2nd Baronet and Lady Sarah Windsor (a daughter of the 4th Earl of Plymouth), in 1814. After her death in 1831, he married Wilhelmina Powell, daughter of David Powell of Bench House, Loughton, Essex, in 1836. After her death in 1842, he married Augusta Cowell, daughter of John B. Cowell, in 1849.
- Hon. Christian Elizabeth Irby (1786–1875).
- Hon. Edward Methuen Irby (1788–1809), an officer in the 3rd Regiment of Foot Guards who died at the Battle of Talavera.
- Hon. Charles Leonard Irby (1789–1845), a Captain in the Royal Navy who travelled to the Middle East, author of Travels in Egypt and Nubia, Syria, and Asia Minor; during the years 1817 & 1818 and Travels in Egypt and Nubia, Syria, and the Holy Land (1852); he married Frances Mangles, daughter of John Mangles, in 1825.
- Hon. Augusta Matilda Irby (1791–1877), who married Rev. William Holdsworth in 1853.
- Hon. Anne Maria Louisa Irby (1792–1870), who married Henry Peachey, 3rd Baron Selsey, a son of John Peachey, 2nd Baron Selsey and Hester Elizabeth Jennings, in 1817.
- Hon. Adolphus Frederick Irby (1797–1863), a Reverend who died unmarried.

Lord Boston died on 23 March 1825, aged 75, at Lower Grosvenor Street, Mayfair, London. His widow died on 9 May 1832.

Peerage of Great Britain
Preceded by William Irby	Baron Boston; 1775–1825	Succeeded by George Irby
