= Trollope & Colls =

British construction company

- Industry: Construction
- Founded: 1903
- Defunct: 1996
- Fate: Acquired
- Successor: Trafalgar House
- Headquarters: Marlow, UK

Trollope & Colls was a British construction company. In the latter decades of the 20th century, it was one of the nation's largest construction companies.

The firm was created in 1903 from the merger of George Trollope & Sons and Colls & Sons, two established construction companies. During the First World War, Trollope & Colls undertook pioneering work on reinforced concrete. During the interwar period, it sought out work internationally in places such as the Far East. The firm was heavily involved in the reconstruction efforts following the Second World War. It was acquired by the British conglomerate Trafalgar House in 1969.

During the early 1990s, the company was reorganised, its two main arms being merged, its management centered around new headquarters, and it was rebranded as Trafalgar House Construction. On 18 April 1996, the Norwegian shipbuilding and engineering group Kvaerner acquired Trafalgar House and its subsidiaries, after which the company traded under the name Kvaerner Trollope & Colls. Throughout its existence, it was responsible for numerous major works, such as the Ministry of Defence Main Building, Trawsfynndd power station, and Hull Royal Infirmary. The firm also played a key role in expansion and restoration efforts on countless projects.

== History ==
The origins of Trollope and Colls Ltd can be traced back to 1778 and two distinct businesses founded by the Trollope and Colls families. Both firms had their background in interior decoration (Joseph Trollope was a wallpaper hanger while Benjamin Colls was a painter and decorator) and were both based in London for much of their existence. Likewise, each company developed into sizable construction operations that served major clients. Furthermore, both George Howard Trollope and John Howard Colls were presidents of the Central Association of Master Builders.

During 1903, the combined company was formed as a result of the merger of George Trollope & Sons and Colls & Sons. Trading under the name Trollope & Colls, the firm opted to specialise in civil engineering. During the First World War, it undertook pioneering work on reinforced concrete, which included the construction of various docks, viaducts and railway bridges. During the conflict, there was a labour shortage; this led the company to employ women in traditionally male-dominated role, such as carpentry.

Beyond its domestic undertakings, the company also sought out work as far afield as the Far East. In the aftermath of the Second World War, the firm was heavily involved in the reconstruction efforts. During 1969, the company was acquired by the British conglomerate Trafalgar House; it operated as a subsidiary of its new owner and maintained its name.

During the early 1990s, the two main arms of Trollope and Colls business, which were judged to have been increasingly bidding for work within the same territory within Greater London, were merged; the combined entity was also centered around new offices in the City of London. By 1994, it was the largest contractor in the United Kingdom in terms of turnover.

On 18 April 1996, the Norwegian shipbuilding and engineering group Kvaerner acquired Trafalgar House Construction, as the business became known, as part of a £904 million offer for Trafalgar House plc. Thereafter, the company started trading under the name Kvaerner Trollope & Colls. The company has since been effectively incorporated into Skanska.

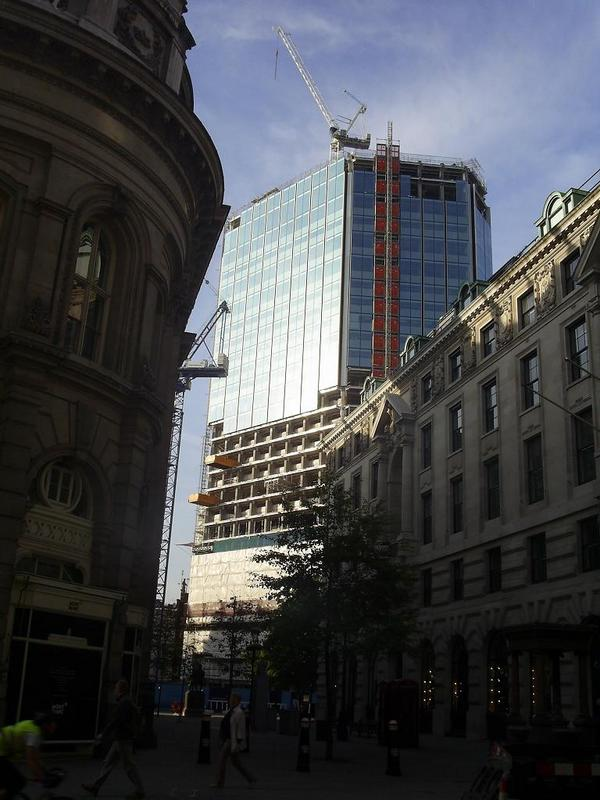
The Stock Exchange Tower built by Trollope & Colls

== Major projects ==
Projects undertaken by the company and its predecessors included: Her Majesty's Theatre completed in 1869, St Philip's Church, Battersea completed in 1870, the Institute of Chartered Accountants completed in 1892, Claridge's completed in 1897, the Baltic Exchange completed in 1903, the Debenhams Headquarters in Wigmore Street completed in 1908, Lloyds Bank's headquarters in Lombard Street completed in 1931, the Ministry of Defence Main Building completed in 1959, Trawsfynndd power station completed in 1962, Hull Royal Infirmary completed in 1965, Northwick Park Hospital completed in 1970, and the Stock Exchange Tower completed in 1972.

In addition to the construction of new building, numerous projects undertaken by Trollope & Colls were centered around the refurbishment of existing buildings, such as Oxo Tower and New Zealand House. Numerous largely organisations, such as the London Underground, turned to the company to perform upgrades and expansions.
