= Stock Exchange Tower =

Office building in London

Coordinates: 51°30′52″N 0°05′12″W

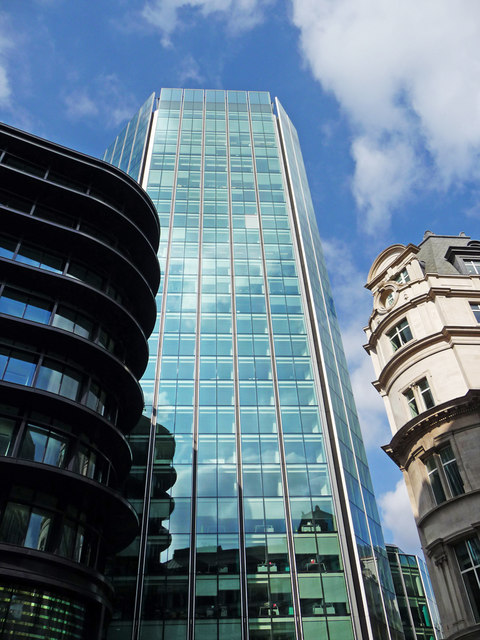
125 Old Broad Street after renovation and recladding, 2009

125 Old Broad Street, formerly known as the Stock Exchange Tower and still often referred to as such, is a high-rise office building in London, located on Old Broad Street in the City of London financial district.

For over 30 years the Stock Exchange Tower was the home of the London Stock Exchange, until the exchange's relocation to Paternoster Square in 2004.

== History ==
Standing at 100 metres (328 ft) tall with 26 floors, the Stock Exchange Tower was completed by Trollope & Colls in 1970. It was officially opened by Queen Elizabeth II on 8 November 1972.

It served as the headquarters, offices and trading floor for the London Stock Exchange, until the exchange departed for new premises in nearby Paternoster Square in July 2004. Face-to-face trading was conducted on the trading floor of the exchange, until it was abolished in favour of electronic trading in the October 1986 deregulation of the London Stock Exchange known as the 'Big Bang'.

On 20 July 1990, the Provisional IRA exploded a bomb inside the tower, causing its evacuation. The bomb destroyed the public viewing areas in the building, which subsequently closed in 1992. It was also evacuated on 11 September 2001, after the terrorist attacks on the World Trade Center in New York City.

== Renovation ==
The building underwent a major renovation which saw its pre-cast concrete façade reclad in a glass curtain wall, and thousands of square metres of additional office space created, including a new 10-storey building at No. 60 Threadneedle Street, a six-storey wing to the east, and a single-storey wing to the northwest. As part of the renovation, the floor plates were extended beyond the perimeter of the original building to give more overall space. The renovation scheme was designed by Grimshaw Architects.

The building has 11 passenger lifts and one goods lift, as well as firefighting lifts and vehicle shuttle lifts.

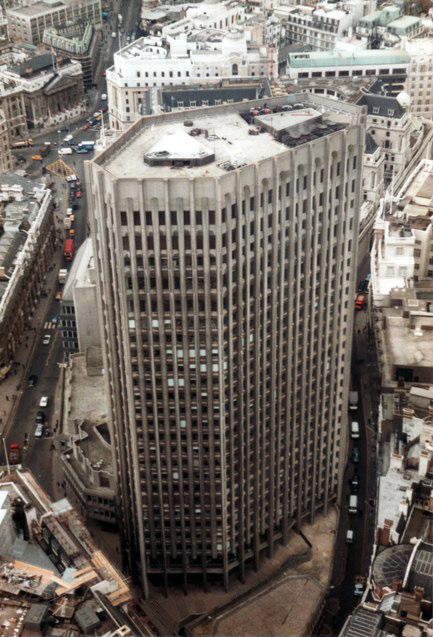
The Stock Exchange Tower pictured in 1983 from atop the National Westminster Tower

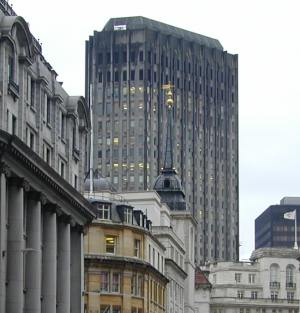
The Stock Exchange Tower in the 1990s before the recladding

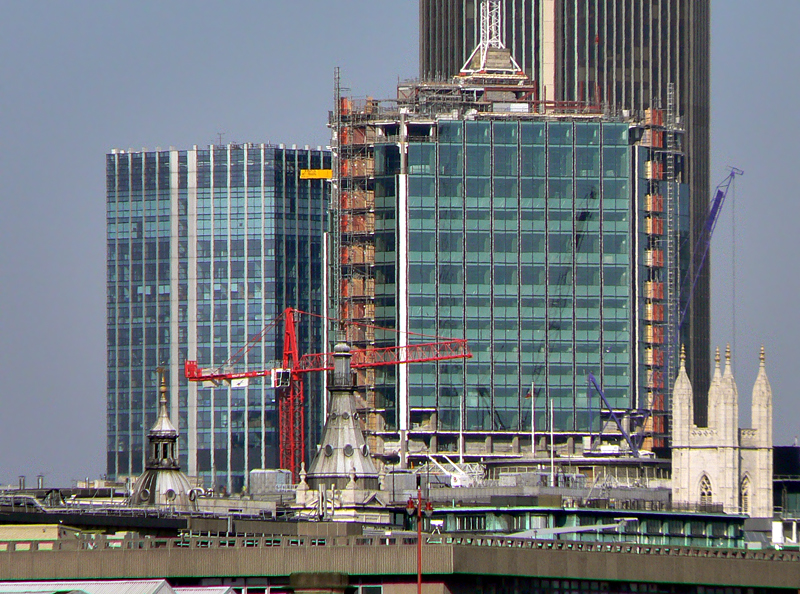
The recladding in progress, May 2007.

== See also ==
- Tower 42
- Tall buildings and structures in London
