= Thomas Fortescue (secretary) =

Anglo-Irish civil servant and secretary

Thomas Fortescue (12 November 1780 – 7 September 1872) was an Anglo-Irish civil servant and secretary.

== Early life ==
Fortescue was born in 1784. He was the son of Elizabeth (née Tew) Fortescue and Gerald Fortescue, who served as Ulster King of Arms. His sister, Anne Elizabeth Fortescue, married William Richard Hopkins-Northey (grandparents of the 5th Baron Boston).

His paternal grandparents were Chichester Fortescue and the former Hon. Elizabeth Wesley (a daughter of the 1st Baron Mornington and sister to the 1st Earl of Mornington). Among his large family were uncles, Chichester Fortescue, a Rear Admiral, Thomas Fortescue, MP, and Elizabeth Fortescue, who married William Kerr, 5th Marquess of Lothian. His maternal grandfather was John Tew of Dublin.

== Career ==
Fortescue began working in the Indian Civil Service in 1798. He acted as secretary to his cousin, Henry Wellesley, lieutenant-governor of the recently ceded province of Oudh, 1801 to 1803. On the capture of Delhi, October 1803, he was appointed civil commissioner there.

He founded the Hog Hunting Club of Bengal in 1807. In 1812, while judge and Magistrate at Allahabad (today Prayagraj), he built a large bungalow for himself there.

== Personal life ==
On 19 March 1859 Fortescue married Louisa Margaret Russell, second daughter of Thomas Russell.

He died on 7 September 1872 at Eaton Square, London. Part of his official correspondence is preserved at the British Museum.
