= The Ascension, Lavender Hill =

Coordinates: 51.4655°N 0.1574°W

The Ascension of The Lord, Lavender Hill
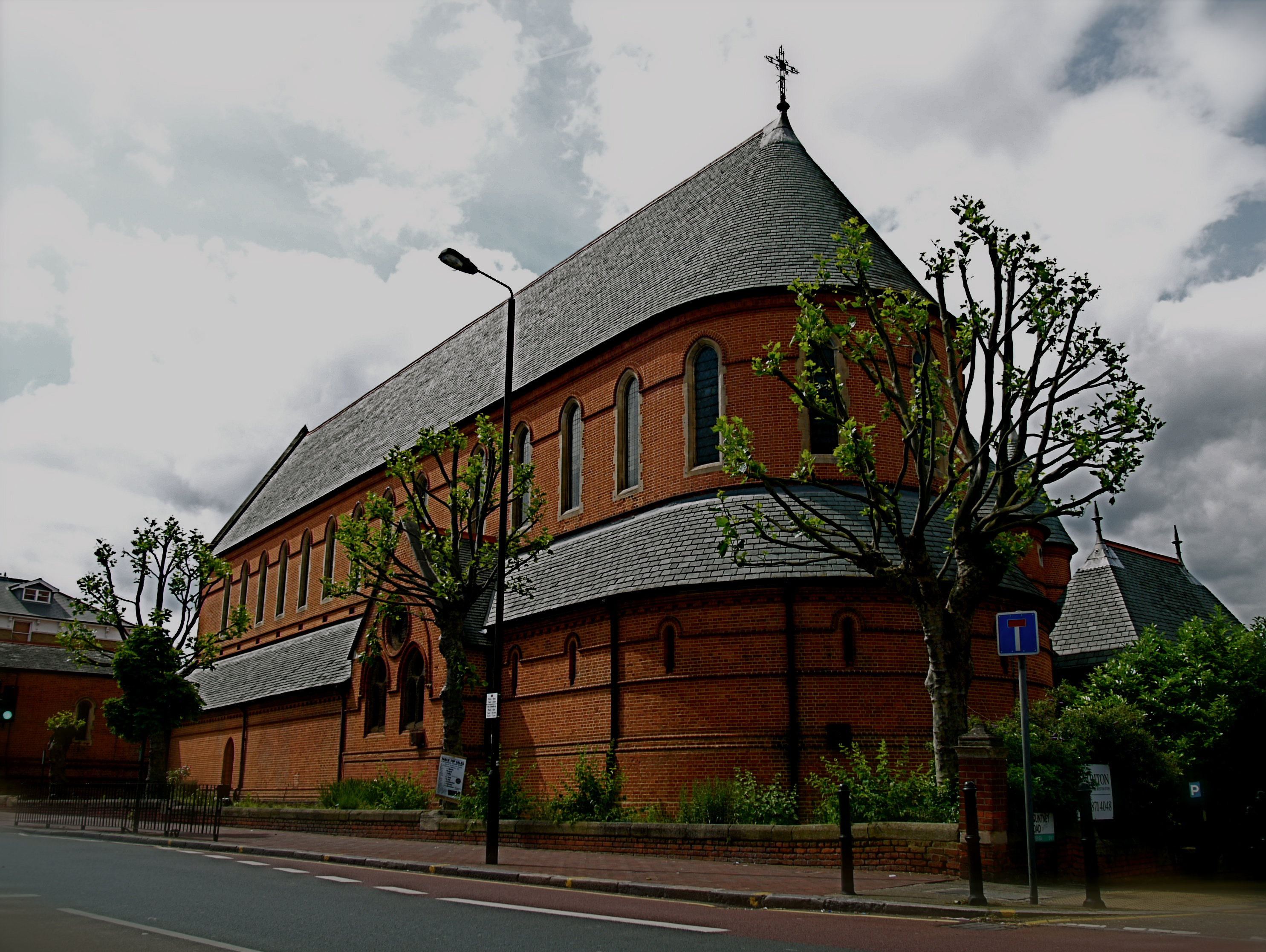
- Exterior photo of The Ascension, Lavender Hill
- The Ascension of The Lord, Lavender Hill
- Country: England
- Denomination: Church of England
- Website: Parish Website

History
- Dedicated: 1883

Architecture
- Architect: James Brooks

Administration
- Diocese: The Diocese of Southwark Formerly the Diocese of Rochester
- Parish: Lavender Hill, The Ascension and Battersea, St. Philip with St. Bartholomew

Clergy
- Bishop: Bishop of Southwark (Diocesan) Bishop of Fulham (AEO)
- Priest: Fr Philip Kennedy SSC

The Ascension of The Lord, Lavender Hill, is an Anglican church in the Anglo-Catholic tradition, situated on Lavender Hill, in Battersea, South West London. It is thought to be the first church in England dedicated to The Ascension of The Lord. Built to the designs of the architect James Brooks, its foundation stone was laid in 1874, and it was consecrated in 1883.

The church is one of three in the parish of Lavender Hill, The Ascension and Battersea, St. Philip with St. Bartholomew. The other two are no longer used by the Church of England. St Philip the Apostle, Queenstown Road is now home to the Ethiopian Orthodox Parish of Saint Mary of Debre Tsion, and St Bartholomew the Less, Wycliffe Road is now home to the Greek Orthodox Parish of St Nectarious.

The church should not be confused with another church dedicated to the Ascension of Our Lord in the same borough, at Balham.

== History ==
=== Foundation ===
The Ascension, Lavender Hill, was principally conceived by Fr John Bourdieu Wilkinson SSC. As a young man Wilkinson had often sat on Clapham Common and gazed down upon the blue fields of lavender which made up the historic Lavender Hill. He often dreamt that if he ever was called to become a priest, it would be upon the Lavender Hill where he would build a church for the faith to be proclaimed.

Eventually his priestly calling began to materialize and he was ordained. Now a priest, Wilkinson was sent to St Barnabas, Pimlico where the effects of the "ritual riots" – a series of protests against high church practices in use there – were being felt. It was these riots that influenced Wilkinson, supported by a number of wealthy ladies from the Pimlico congregation, to conceive the idea of an Anglo-Catholic sanctuary away from the troubles of Central London.

Amongst those who financially contributed to the building of the new church were Lady Anne Antrobus, wife of Sir Edmund Antrobus, her sister-in-law through marriage, The Hon Jane Duff-Gordon, and a young dowager, Amelia, Lady Boston (widow of George Irby, 4th Baron Boston and daughter of John Saumarez, 3rd Baron de Saumarez). A sizeable benefaction made by the ladies was used to purchase the grounds of Pountney House which ran from what is now Acanthus Road to the end of Crown Terrace (where the Crown pub is situated today), and north of the church to Elsley Road. Only about a third of this land now remains in church hands. It was not until 1872, that Father Wilkinson, Lady Antrobus and the Hon. Mrs. Jane Duff-Gordon moved to Lavender Hill and the plot of land on which the church stands was purchased, thanks to the generosity of Lady Boston.

=== Construction ===
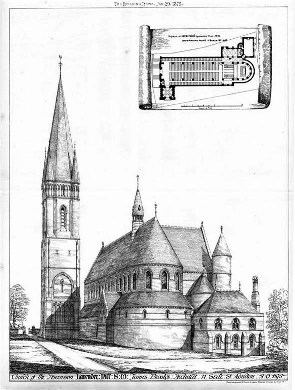
Brooks plan for the church, including the unbuilt tower

The people of the Shaftesbury Estate, many of them railway workers who had moved from the East End to work at nearby Clapham Junction made it clear that they wanted the Ascension to resemble the churches that many of them had left behind in east London. With that in mind, a significant Anglo-Catholic architect, James Brooks, was commissioned to design what was to be one of his finest churches. The foundation stone was laid on 1 June 1874, by John Patrick Boyle, Earl of Glasgow; according to Henry Simmonds in All About Battersea (1882) it was situated "under the altar" of the temporary church.

It was not long before Brooks soon discovered that he was using too much of the available funds for the foundations of the new church. His clients quickly became alarmed by this unforeseen expense, and he was subsequently dismissed as architect. His replacements, J. T. Micklewaite and Somers Clark, completed the church almost entirely to Brooks’ original specification. The overspend, however, meant that some of Brooks more elaborate design features, such as the carving of the stone capitals in the nave, the projected tower with steeple, above what is now the south porch, a belfry and an elaborately carved stone reredos could not be completed.

Like Brooks' East End churches, the Ascension is a bold, simple design, built of brick. A continuous roofline runs the full length of the building. The nave is lit by lancet windows in the clerestory; there are no aisle windows. There is a narrow ambulatory around the chancel. The arcades are supported by short cylindrical columns, with square capitals, plain in the nave and carved with foliage in the chancel. The brickwork above the arcades is left bare. Francis Bumpus noted the French Cistercian influence on the Ascension, and on his Holy Innocents in Hammersmith, saying that both buildings were "conceived in a bold and vigorous Early Pointed style, recalling such Burgundian examples as Auxerre and Pontigny" and admirably adapted to contemporary requirements.

The new church was consecrated for worship by the Bishop of Bishop of Rochester, Anthony Thorold, within whose diocese the parish then was, on 30 June 1883.

=== Fire ===
Just before 7pm on Friday 13 April 1979, which happened to be Good Friday, a fierce fire broke out, quickly spreading along the church roof, and threatened to destroy the building in its entirety. The London Fire Brigade sent fire fighters from some six stations, some of whom worked throughout the night to ensure that this historic landmark was saved. The then Parish Priest Fr John Cuthbert CMP, praised the work of the fire service, recognizing that without their assistance the damage sustained to the building would have been far worse.

== Worship ==
The Ascension, Lavender Hill is an Anglo-Catholic church which is affiliated to Forward in Faith, and served by priests of the Society of the Holy Cross. As such its style of churchmanship and worship is Catholic. There is an emphasis on the Seven Sacraments including Confessions. Practices and services include those of The Reserved Sacrament, The Veneration of Relics, Benediction of the Blessed Sacrament, The Rosary, Devotion to Our Lady, and Stations of the Cross.

Sunday Mass incorporates the "bells and smells" nature of an Anglo-Catholic church with the use of incense, throughout, and bells at the Eucharist. There are lay deacons and sub-deacons, and servers, who wear the traditional black cassock and white cotta.

== Gallery ==
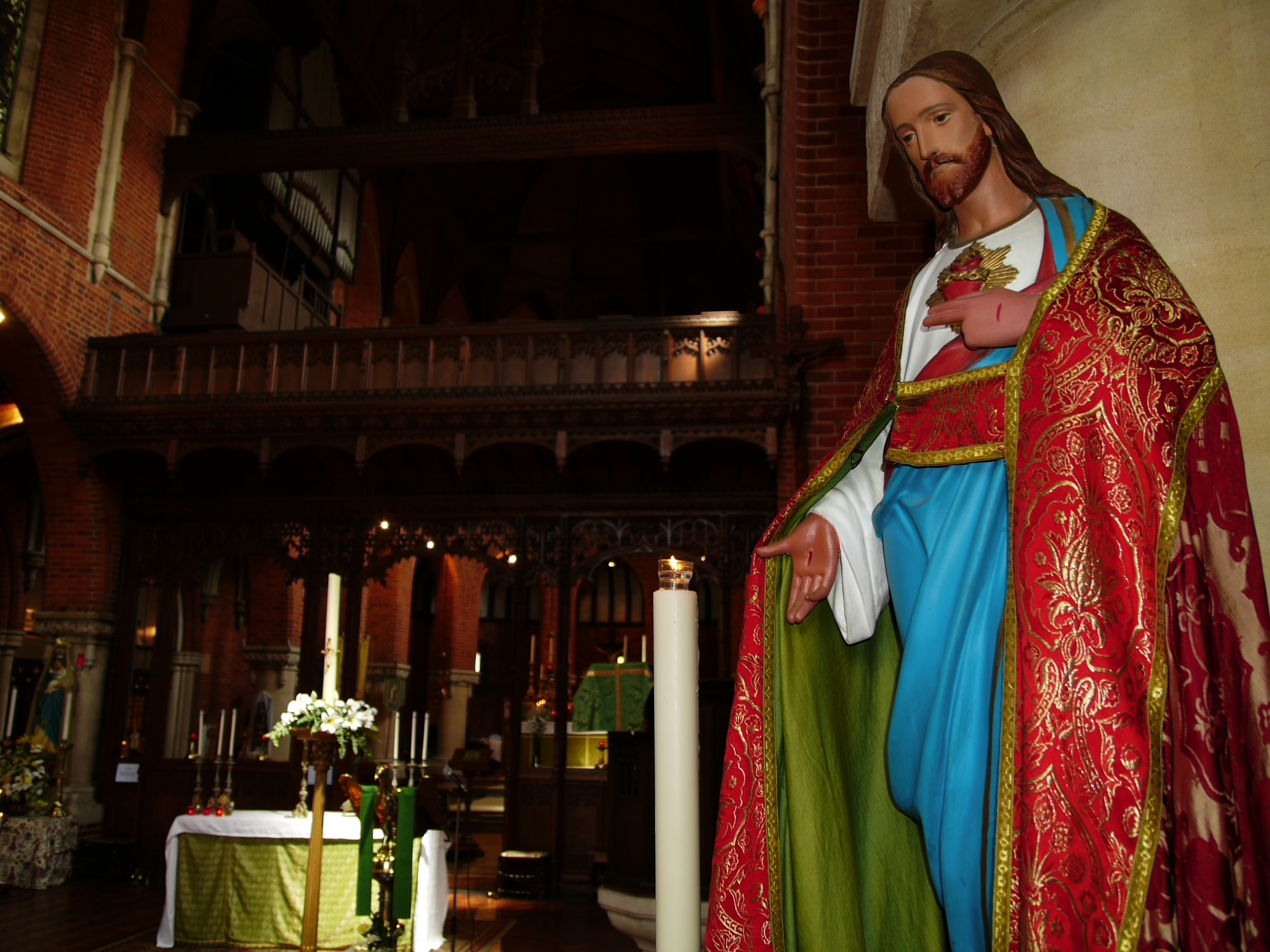
Statue of The Sacred Heart

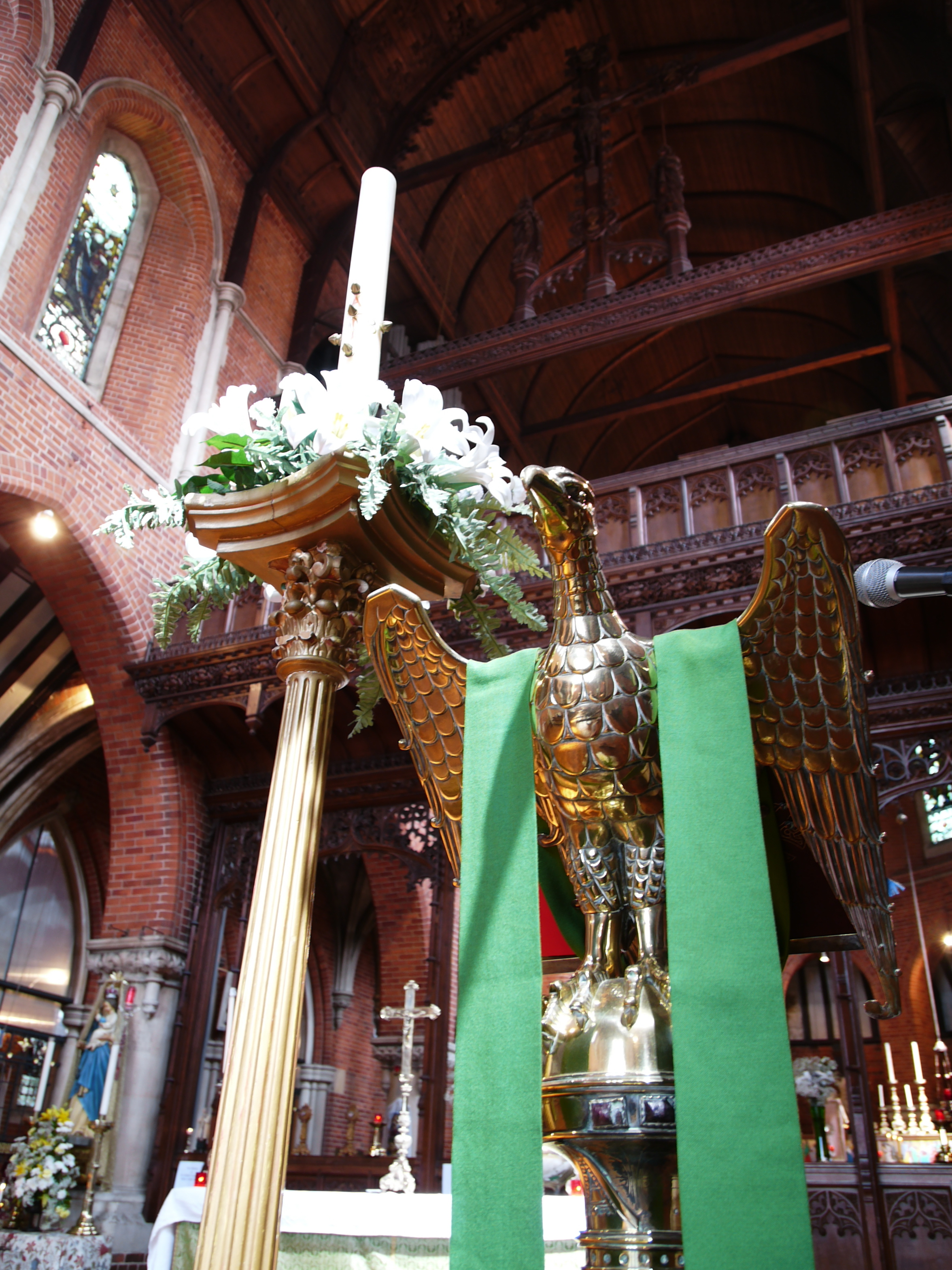
The Lectern in Ordinary Time

== Parish priests ==
No.	Incumbent	From	Until
1	Fr John Bourdieu Wilkinson SSC	1874	1885
2	Fr Charles Stebbing Wallace SSC	1885	1914
3	Fr John Arthur Mainwaring Montford	1914	1923
4	Fr Egbert de Grey Lucas	1923	1930
5	Fr Donald Vincent Beckingham	1930	1938
6	Fr Herbert Edwin Palmer	1939	1943
7	Fr John Austin Allen SSC	1944	1958
8	Fr Edward Bruce Branwell	1958	1964
9	Fr Alan George Cookman SSC	1965	1972
10	Fr John Hamilton Cuthbert CMP	1972	1997
11	Fr Patrick Charles Benedict Allen OSB SSC	1997	2008
12	Fr Iain Clavering Young SSC	2009	2021
13	Fr Philip Kennedy SSC	2021	Present
