= Edward Irby =

English politician (1676–1718)

Sir Edward Irby, Bt

Member of Parliament for Boston
- In office 1707–1708 Serving with Richard Wynn
- Preceded by: Parliament of England
- Succeeded by: Peregrine Bertie; Richard Wynn
- In office 1702–1707 Serving with Peregrine Bertie, Richard Wynn
- Preceded by: Peregrine Bertie; Sir William Yorke
- Succeeded by: Parliament of Great Britain

Personal details
- Born: 31 July 1676
- Died: 11 November 1718 (aged 42) King's Cliffe, Northamptonshire
- Spouse: Dorothy Paget (m. 1706; died 1718)
- Children: William Irby, 1st Baron Boston
- Parent(s): Anthony Irby; Mary Stringer

Sir Edward Irby, 1st Baronet (31 July 1676 – 11 November 1718) was an English politician who sat in the House of Commons of England from 1702 until 1708 when following the Act of Union 1707 it had become the House of Commons of Great Britain.

== Early life ==
Irby was born on 31 July 1676. He was the eldest son of Anthony Irby (d. 1684) and his wife Mary Stringer.

His paternal grandparents were Sir Anthony Irby and Hon. Katherine Paget (a daughter of the 4th Baron Paget). His maternal grandfather was John Stringer of Ashford, Kent.

== Career ==
In 1702, he was elected Member of Parliament for Boston, representing the constituency until 1708. On 13 April 1704, he was created a baronet, of Whaplode and Boston, in the County of Lincolnshire.

== Personal life ==
In 1706, Irby married his cousin, Dorothy Paget, only daughter of Hon. Henry Paget, second son of William Paget, 5th Baron Paget. Together, they were the parents of a son and a daughter, including:

- William Irby, 1st Baron Boston (1707–1775), who married Albinia Selwyn, daughter of Henry Selwyn and Ruth Compton, in 1746.

Irby died intestate at King's Cliffe, Northamptonshire and was buried at Whaplode, Lincolnshire. His widow, Lady Irby, died c. October 1734. He was succeeded in the baronetcy by his only son William, later raised to the Peerage of Great Britain as Baron Boston.

Parliament of England
Preceded by Peregrine Bertie; Sir William Yorke	Member of Parliament for Boston; 1702–1707; With: Peregrine Bertie 1702–1705; Richard Wynn 1705–1707	Succeeded by Parliament of Great Britain
Parliament of Great Britain
Preceded by Parliament of England	Member of Parliament for Boston; 1707–1708; With: Richard Wynn	Succeeded by Peregrine Bertie; Richard Wynn
Baronetage of England
New creation	Baronet (of Whaplode and Boston); 1704–1718	Succeeded by William Irby
