= William Drake (1747–1795) =

British politician (c. 1747–1795)

Member of Parliament for Amersham
- In office 1768–1795 Serving with William Drake
- Preceded by: William Drake; John Affleck
- Succeeded by: William Drake; Thomas Drake Tyrwhitt-Drake

Personal details
- Born: c. 1747
- Died: 18 May 1795 (aged 47–48)
- Spouse(s): Mary Hussey (m. 1778; died 1778) Rachel Elizabeth Ives (m. 1781; died 1784)
- Children: Rachel Ives Irby, Baroness Boston; Emily Ives Irby
- Parent(s): William Drake; Elizabeth Raworth
- Education: Westminster School
- Alma mater: Brasenose College, Oxford

William Drake (c. 1747 – 18 May 1795) was a British politician who sat in the House of Commons between 1768 and 1795.

== Early life ==
Drake was the son of William Drake of Shardeloes, a son of Montague Garrard Drake, MP, and Elizabeth Raworth, a daughter of John Raworth of Basinghall St., London.

He was educated at Westminster School from 1759 to 1764 and matriculated at Brasenose College, Oxford on 20 June 1765, aged 17. He then undertook the Grand Tour.

== Career ==
In 1768 he was returned as Member of Parliament for Amersham. He was re-elected in 1774, 1780 1784 and 1790 and shared the seat with his father all that time. He was a member of the St. Alban's Tavern group which tried to bring about a union between Fox and Pitt. He was a prolific speaker with a powerful voice. It was said "He talked sense, and his speeches were ornate: he was fond of a Latin quotation".

== Personal life ==
Drake married firstly Mary Hussey on 17 February 1778 who died six months later on 23 October 1778. After her death, he married Rachel Elizabeth Ives (1761–1784), a daughter of Jeremiah Ives of Norwich on 20 August 1781. Before her death on 4 August 1784, they were the parents of:

- Rachel Ives Drake (1783–1830), who married George Irby, 3rd Baron Boston, son of Frederick Irby, 2nd Baron Boston and Christian Methuen (a daughter of Paul Methuen of Corsham Court, MP for Westbury, Warwick, and Great Bedwyn), in 1801.
- Emily Ives Drake (1784–1806), who married Rear-Admiral Hon. Frederick Paul Irby, son of Frederick Irby, 2nd Baron Boston and Christian Methuen, in 1803. After her death, he married Frances Wright, daughter of Ichabod Wright, in 1816.

Drake predeceased his father on 18 May 1795 leaving an immense property partly acquired by marriage, and partly by some collateral branches. It was said that had he lived to inherit that of his father, he would have been one of the richest men in the country.

Drake's daughters, Rachel and Emily, upon their marriages, each inherited one half of their maternal grandfather Jeremiah Ives's property, the Manors of Boyland (including Boyland Hall} and Fritton, as well as Drake's property in Boyland, Fritton, Hempnall, Morningthorpe, Stratton St. Mary and St. Michael, Long Stratton and Tasburgh; Drake's messuage in Flixton and land in Flixton and Gunton, Suffolk; Drake's house 'The White House' and land in Blundeston; Drake's messuage and land in Corton, Suffolk; Drake's messuage in Amersham in Buckinghamshire, formerly part of the George Inn; property in Amersham, Chesham and Woburn, including Chartridge Farm in Chesham and Woburn; property formerly of Jeremiah Ives as described in 1781 Drake-Ives settlement.

Parliament of Great Britain
Preceded by William Drake; John Affleck	Member of Parliament for Amersham; 1768–1795; With: William Drake	Succeeded by William Drake; Thomas Drake Tyrwhitt-Drake
