= John R. Irby =

John Irby is a journalist, professor, and former editor of the Bismarck Tribune.

He returned to newspapers in June 2007 after spending eight years as a clinical associate professor at the Edward R. Murrow School of Communication at Washington State University. While there he was named national journalism teacher of the year by the newspaper division of the Association for Education in Journalism and Mass Communication (AEJMC). He received a journalism degree from Pepperdine University in Los Angeles.

He joined WSU in the fall of 1999 and his teaching emphasis was mainly in the journalism field. He also served as the advisor of WSU Chapter of Society of Professional Journalists.

Before he taught at WSU, he worked in newspapers for more than 25 years. He began his career in community journalism as a reporter and photographer at a 4,000-circulation weekly and later worked as an editor at a 450,000-circulation daily. He also held the publisher's job at small and medium-sized daily newspapers and was editor of two newspaper groups with more than 100,000 circulation. He was a past president of the California Society of Newspaper Editors and has been a member of the American Society of Newspaper Editors and Associated Press Managing Editors.

In 2011, Irby retired as editor of the Bismarck Tribune after a 40-year career in journalism.

He is also the author of Kill the Editor and the lead author of Reporting That Matters, Public Affairs Coverage. In retirement he has written a religious book titled "Lessons from my fathers in heaven."

Early in retirement he was a consultant for the North Dakota University System, a local Federal Emergency Management Agency hire, consultant for the Standing Rock Sioux Tribe and private investigator. He currently lives in a mountain cabin in Ellijay, Georgia.

He is also a member by blood of the Choctaw Nation of Oklahoma.
