= Lee Irby =

American novelist and historian (born 1963)

- Born: 1963 (age 62–63); Richmond, Virginia, U.S.
- Education: University of Virginia
- Occupations: Novelist; historian

Lee Irby (born 1963) is an American novelist and historian.

He is the author of three major novels. The first, 7,000 Clams (as of 2010, in 596 libraries according to WorldCat), and was reviewed in The North American Review and many newspapers. His later work, The Up and Up (as of 2010, in 406 libraries according to WorldCat), and was reviewed even more widely. Both were published by Doubleday. Irby's work centers on the quirks of Florida's history, the interplay of natural beauty and rampant corruption and violence that marked the Sunshine State in the 1920s. In early 2012, he released "The Van", a novel following the life of a VW Bus. He taught at Eckerd College, a private liberal arts school located in St. Petersburg, Florida.

Irby was born in Richmond, Virginia, in 1963. He graduated from the University of Virginia in 1986 with degrees in English and History. He then set about seeing the world, living in St. Croix, Italy, Mexico, and several major U.S. cities. He came of age in Key West, Florida, where he worked many odd jobs but found his voice as a writer amid the human debris of that island city.
