= Augustus Arthur Vansittart =

English scholar

Augustus Arthur Vansittart (24 July 1824 – 17 April 1882) was an English scholar.

== Life ==
He was the son of George Henry Vansittart of Bisham Abbey—his father predeceased his birth—and his widow Anna Maria, daughter and coheiress of Thomas Copson of Sheppey Hall, Leicestershire. He was educated at Eton College and Trinity College, Cambridge, where he became a fellow.

Vansittart was noted for collation of the various readings of the New Testament, and founded the Sedgwick Prize, a geology prize for Cambridge Fellows. He built "Pinehurst House", on Grange Road, Cambridge. He is buried in the Ascension Parish Burial Ground, Cambridge.

== Family ==
Vansittart married, on 26 May 1857, Rachel Fanny Anne Irby, eldest daughter of George Irby, 4th Baron Boston.
