= Irby Koffman =

American football coach and public school superintendent

Biographical details
- Born: March 15, 1899
- Died: November 18, 1968 (aged 69); Edison, New Jersey, U.S.
- Education: Murray State

Coaching career (HC unless noted)
- 1924: Murray State

Head coaching record
- Overall: 3–3–3

Irby Harvy Koffman (March 15, 1899 – November 18, 1968) was an American college football coach and a public school superintendent. He was the first head football coach at Murray State University–then known as Murray State College–serving for one season, in 1924, and compiling record of 3–3–3. After leaving coaching, Koffman served as a public school superintendent at several schools, including one in Gibson County, Tennessee from 1934 to 1939.

== Head coaching record ==
Year	Team	Overall	Conference	Standing	Bowl/playoffs
Murray State Blue and Gold (Independent) (1924)
1924	Murray State	3–3–3			
Murray State:		3–3–3			
Total:		3–3–3			
