= Shepeau Stow, Lincolnshire =

Hamlet in the South Holland district of Lincolnshire, England

Coordinates: 52.692356°N 0.067946527°W

Shepeau Stow
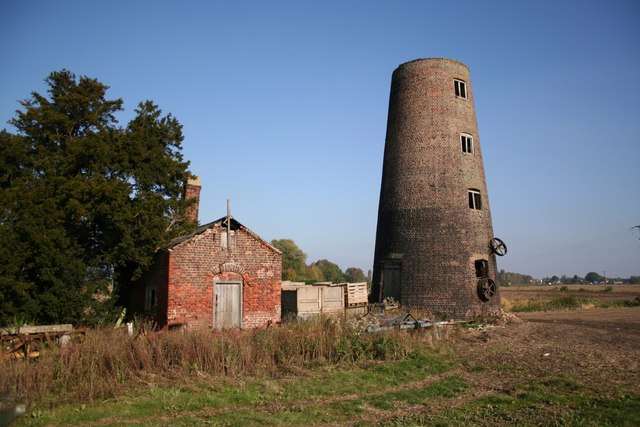
- Tower mill, Shepeau Stow

- Location within Lincolnshire
- OS grid reference: TF306122
  - London: 85 mi (137 km) S
- District: South Holland
- Shire county: Lincolnshire
- Region: East Midlands
- Country: England
- Sovereign state: United Kingdom
- Post town: Spalding
- Postcode district: PE12
- Police: Lincolnshire
- Fire: Lincolnshire
- Ambulance: East Midlands
- UK Parliament: South Holland and the Deepings

Shepeau Stow is a hamlet in the South Holland district of Lincolnshire, England. It is at the north-east edge of Whaplode civil parish, where it adjoins Crowland civil parish, and on the B1166 Hull's Drove road. Shepeau Stow is 7 miles (11 km) south-east from Spalding and 4 miles (6 km) east from Crowland.

The hamlet's school is Shepeau Stow Primary School on Dowsdale Bank. In the 2012 latest Ofsted report, the school received an overall Grade 2 (Good), quality rating.

== History ==
The B1166 road from Shepeau Stow to Holbeach Drove to the east is the line of a 1241 fen drainage bank, the third of three constructed between Whaplode Drove to the north and Shepeau Stow. The resulting fen-drained common land was enclosed in 1819 under Enclosure Act.

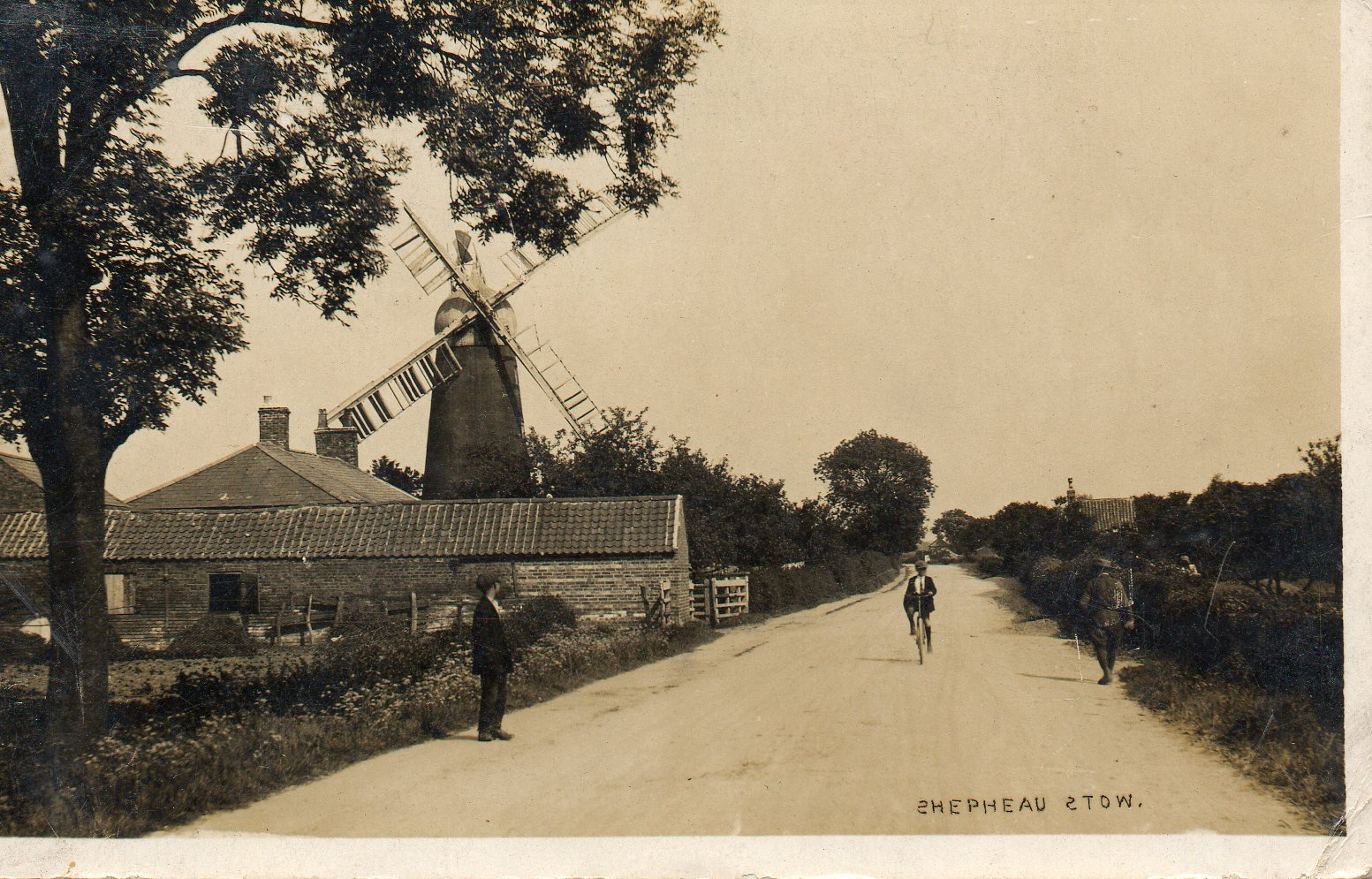
Shepeau Stow Mill in 1921

In 19th-century directories the hamlet was named 'Shephaystow' and 'Shephay Stowe'. In 1855 there existed a mill with miller, and the Red Last public house. By 1872 the mill housed a corn miller who was also a baker. There was a pub called the Mill Inn run by a victualler who was also a brewer and shopkeeper at the same premises. There was a blacksmith, and a shoemaker who also ran a beerhouse. 1885 listings included a publican at the Red Last Inn, a coal dealer, a farmer, a blacksmith, and a wind miller. By 1933 listed were two farmers, a saddler, a carpenter, and the publican at the Red Last. Within the hamlet was a Methodist chapel with seating for 300, while the surrounding area produced potatoes, wheat and other cereals, and "large quantities of geese fatted for the London and other markets." The Red Last Inn was a brewery pub, extant in 1949, but now converted to a private dwelling.

At the east of the hamlet on Drove Road are the Grade II listed late 18th-century remains of the tower mill. The mill was working with four sails until the 1920s, but by the middle of the 1930s it had lost its roof and become a ruin.

In 2015 late 19th-century 'T' plan barn buildings of hand made brick, "good examples of local rural vernacular architecture," were the subject of an historic building survey before a proposed redevelopment at Carter's Farm on Oxcroft Bank. The survey showed various stages of original building, which included a hay loft and wood partitions, with stable block and cattle shed with hayracks and feed troughs.
