= Frederick Paul Irby =

Royal Navy admiral

Rear-Admiral Frederick Paul Irby CB DL
- Portrait by Simon Jacques Rochard, 1822
- Born: 18 April 1779
- Died: 24 April 1844 (aged 65); Boyland Hall, near Norwich
- Relatives: Frederick Irby, 2nd Baron Boston (father); Paulina Irby (daughter); Howard Irby (son)
- Military career
- Allegiance: United Kingdom
- Branch: Royal Navy
- Service years: 1791–1844
- Rank: Rear-admiral
- Commands: HMS Volcano; HMS Jalouse; Essex Sea Fencibles; HMS Amelia
- Conflicts: French Revolutionary Wars; Glorious First of June; Battle of Camperdown; Napoleonic Wars; Battle of Les Sables-d'Olonne; Battle of the Basque Roads; Action of 7 February 1813
- Awards: Companion of the Order of the Bath
- Other work: Magistrate; Deputy Lord Lieutenant of Norfolk

Rear-Admiral Frederick Paul Irby CB DL (18 April 1779 – 24 April 1844) was a Royal Navy officer who served in the French Revolutionary and Napoleonic Wars.

== Early life ==
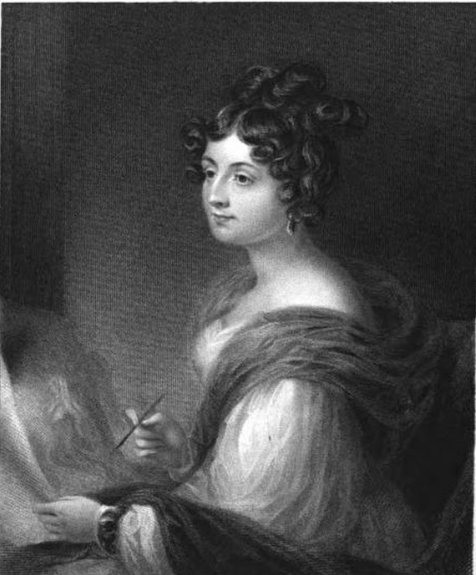
Frances Wright Irby

Frederick Irby was born on 18 April 1779. He was the second son of Frederick Irby, 2nd Baron Boston, and his wife, Christian (née Methuen). Among his siblings were George Irby, 3rd Baron Boston, Charles Leonard Irby, and Anne Maria Louisa Irby (who married Henry Peachey, 3rd Baron Selsey).

His paternal grandparents were William Irby, 1st Baron Boston, and Albinia Selwyn. His maternal grandfather was Paul Methuen of Corsham Court, MP for Westbury, Warwick, and Great Bedwyn, and his uncle was Paul Cobb Methuen, also MP for Great Bedwyn.

== Career ==
He entered the Royal Navy on 2 January 1791, serving on the Home and North America and West Indies Stations. As a midshipman in HMS Montagu he was present at the Glorious First of June in 1794. On 6 June 1797 he was promoted lieutenant and appointed to HMS Circe, in which he was present at the Battle of Camperdown. He was wrecked off the Texel in HMS Apollo on 7 January 1799. Promoted to commander on 22 April 1800, he became the captain of HMS Volcano, a bomb vessel, moving in 1801 to HMS Jalouse operating in the North Sea.

Jalouse, while under his command, was instrumental in saving HMS Narcissus when she was driven ashore on the coast of Holland. Irby's youngest brother, Charles Leonard Irby, was a midshipman on board Narcissus, having joined her on 23 May.

=== Later career ===
Promoted post-captain on 14 April 1802, he appears to have been placed on half pay. He married Emily Ives Drake, sister of Lady Boston (and hence his sister-in-law), on 1 December 1803. He was appointed in command of a unit of the Sea Fencibles in the Essex District in 1805, and on 7 August 1807 his wife died giving birth to a son. He returned to sea to command HMS Amelia in December 1807, serving under Rear Admiral Stopford on the Home Station. On 24 February 1809 he took part in the Battle of Les Sables-d'Olonne, which drove three large French frigates aground and destroyed them, gaining the special approval of the Admiralty. In 1811, in company with HMS Berwick and HMS Niobe, he destroyed the French frigate Amazone near Barfleur. He became the senior officer on the West Africa Squadron later in 1811. The Action of 7 February 1813 between Amelia and the French frigate Aréthuse ended his naval career. Captain Irby was seriously wounded and after 1813 he saw no further active service. The seventh report (1813) of the African Institution expressed the organization's gratitude for Irby's efforts in reducing the slave trade.

In 1831 he was appointed Companion of the Order of the Bath and, in 1837, was promoted to Rear Admiral. He served as a Magistrate and Deputy Lord Lieutenant of Norfolk.

== Later life ==
He married, firstly, Emily Ives Drake, daughter of Rt. Hon. William Drake and Rachel Elizabeth Ives, on 1 December 1803. Her sister, Rachel Ives Drake, married his elder brother, George Irby, 3rd Baron Boston. Before her death on 7 August 1806, they were the parents of:

- Frederick William Irby (1806–1877), who married Isabella Harriet Bruce, daughter of Robert Nicholson Bruce and Harriet Elizabeth Williams, in 1846.

On 23 January 1816 he married his second wife, Frances Wright, daughter of Ichabod Wright and Harriet Maria Day. They settled in Norfolk, at Boyland Hall, at Long Stratton near Norwich. Together, they had three sons and four daughters, including:

- Frances Harriet Irby (1823–1902), who married Lewis Loyd of Monks Orchard, son of Edward Loyd, in 1845.
- Margaret Amelia Irby (1823–1873), who married Henry Kett Tompson in 1843.
- Charles Paul Irby (1818–1836), an officer in the Royal Navy who was accidentally shot and killed.
- Montagu Henry John Irby (1828–1893)
- Adeline Paulina Irby (1831–1911), a revered hero of Bosnia; she died unmarried.
- Leonard Howard Loyd Irby (1836–1905), a famous ornithologist who married Geraldine Alicia Mary Magenis, daughter of Rev. John Balfour Magenis, in 1864. After her death, he married Mary Brandling, daughter of Col. John James Brandling, in 1884.

He died on 24 April 1844 at age 65.

=== Descendants ===
Through his son Leonard, he was a grandfather of Margaret Irby, who married Sir Morgan Crofton, 6th Baronet, James Fountayne Montagu, and John Wodehouse, 3rd Earl of Kimberley.
