= Henry Percy Anderson =

British diplomat (1831–1896)

Sir Henry Percy Anderson KCMG KCB
- Portrait by Camille Silvy, 1861

Assistant Under-Secretary of State for Foreign Affairs

Personal details
- Born: 20 February 1831
- Died: 19 July 1896 (aged 65)
- Spouse: Augusta Caroline Saumarez (m. 1883)
- Occupation: Diplomat
- Known for: Signatory to the Heligoland–Zanzibar Treaty (1890)

Henry Percy Anderson KCMG KCB (20 February 1831 – 19 July 1896) was a British diplomat.

He was educated at Marlborough College and Christ Church, Oxford and joined the Foreign Office as a Clerk in the Slave Trade Department in 1852. Percy was part of a British legation to the United States from 1861 to 1863, and became Chief of the African Department of the Foreign Office in 1883. In this capacity he served as a delegate to the Berlin Conference in 1884–1885 and was a signatory to the Heligoland–Zanzibar Treaty in 1890. He was appointed Assistant Undersecretary for Foreign Affairs in 1894.

In 1883, he married Hon. Augusta Caroline Saumarez, widow of Florance Irby, 5th Baron Boston. Anderson was made Knight Commander of the Order of St Michael and St George in 1885 and Knight Commander of the Order of the Bath in 1890. Fort Anderson, now Mulanje, in Malawi was named after him. Lord Lugard described him as "the great and only African power" of the Foreign Office.
