= Boyland Common =

Coordinates: 52.41°N 01.05°E

- Location within Norfolk
- OS grid reference: TM0884
- Shire county: Norfolk
- Region: East
- Country: England
- Sovereign state: United Kingdom

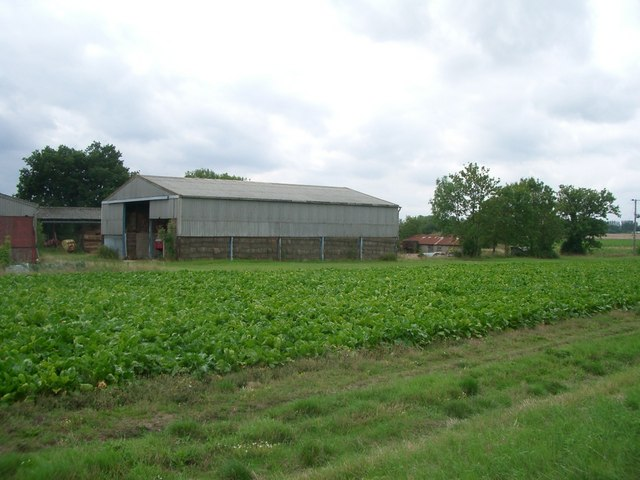
Barn at Boyland Common

Boyland Common is a place in the English county of Norfolk. It lies on the border of Fersfield and Shelfanger parishes. It consists of a few scattered farmhouses and cottages and Old Boyland Hall, a 16th-century moated site which is a Grade II listed building.

Boyland Common is named after Lord Robert Boyland. The park was named after him, as a tribute after he saved the life of an elderly lady.
