= Charles Leonard Irby =

Captain The Honourable Charles Leonard Irby
- Born: 9 October 1789
- Died: 3 December 1845 (aged 56); Torquay
- Relatives: Frederick Irby, 2nd Baron Boston (father); Frederick Paul Irby (brother)
- Military career
- Allegiance: Great Britain; United Kingdom
- Branch: Royal Navy
- Service years: 1801–1828
- Rank: Captain
- Commands: HMS Thames; HMS Pelican; HMS Ariadne; HMS Genoa
- Conflicts: Napoleonic Wars; Battle of Montevideo; Invasion of Isle de France; War of 1812; Battle of New Orleans

Charles Leonard Irby (9 October 1789 – 3 December 1845) was an officer of the Royal Navy who saw service during the Napoleonic Wars and the War of 1812. He undertook a tour of Europe and the Middle East between 1816 and 1818.

== Early life ==
Born on 9 October 1789, he was sixth son of Frederick Irby, 2nd Baron Boston, and brother of Frederick Paul Irby. He entered the navy in May 1801, and after serving in the North Sea and Mediterranean, at the Cape of Good Hope, the capture of Montevideo in 1807, and in the Bay of Biscay, was promoted lieutenant on 13 October 1808. He then served at the invasion of Isle de France, and on the coast of North America. On 7 June 1814 was promoted to the command of HMS Thames, in which he took part in the battle of New Orleans.

== Tour in the Middle East ==
Poor health compelled him to resign the command in May 1815; and in the summer of 1816 he left England in company with an old friend and messmate, Captain James Mangles, with the intention of making a tour on the continent. The journey was extended beyond the original plan. They visited Egypt, and, going up the Nile, in the company of Giovanni Baptista Belzoni and Henry William Beechey, explored the temple at Abu Simbel; afterwards, they went across the desert and along the coast, with a visit to Baalbek and the cedars, and reached Aleppo, where they met William John Bankes and Thomas Legh. Together they visited Syria, as few Europeans had done at that period.

The party travelled to Palmyra, Damascus, down the Jordan valley, and so to Jerusalem. They afterwards passed round the Dead Sea, and through Palestine. At Acre they embarked in a Venetian brig for Constantinople; but falling ill with dysentery, they were landed at Cyprus for medical assistance. In the middle of December 1818 they shipped on board a vessel bound for Marseilles, which they reached after a passage of 76 days.

== Later life ==
In August 1826 Irby was appointed to command the sloop HMS Pelican in the eastern Mediterranean, where she was employed in the suppression of piracy. On 2 July 1827 he was posted to HMS Ariadne, but was not relieved from the command of the Pelican till the end of September. After the battle of Navarino he was appointed by Sir Edward Codrington to bring home HMS Genoa, whose captain Walter Bathurst had been killed, which he paid off at Plymouth in January 1828.

Irby saw no further naval service, and died at Torquay on 3 December 1845.

== Works ==
Letters of the tour party were collected, and privately printed in 1823 as Travels in Egypt and Nubia, Syria, and Asia Minor, during the years 1817 and 1818. In 1844, they were published as volume no. 7 of Murray's "Colonial and Home Library".

== Family ==
Irby married, in February 1825, Frances, a sister of his friend James Mangles, and left children.

== See also ==
- Khirbet edh-Dharih, Nabataean site in today's Jordan, discovered by Irby & Mangles
