= Oving, Buckinghamshire =

Village in Buckinghamshire, England

Coordinates: 51.8848°N 0.8604°W

Oving
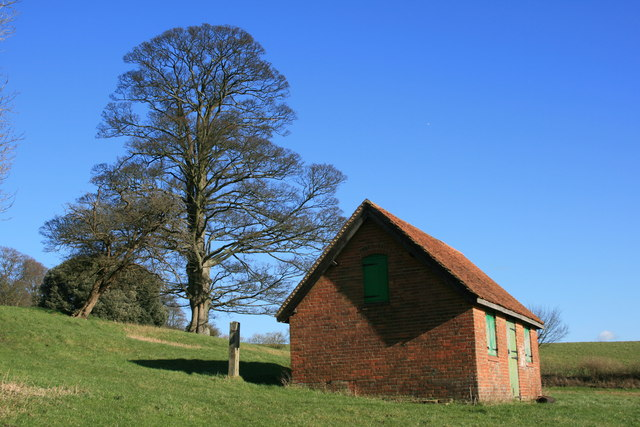
- View from Bunces Lane

- Location within Buckinghamshire
- Population: 478 (2011 Census including Pitchcott)
- OS grid reference: SP784211
- Civil parish: Oving
- Unitary authority: Buckinghamshire
- Ceremonial county: Buckinghamshire
- Region: South East
- Country: England
- Sovereign state: United Kingdom
- Post town: AYLESBURY
- Postcode district: HP22
- Dialling code: 01296
- Police: Thames Valley
- Fire: Buckinghamshire
- Ambulance: South Central
- UK Parliament: Buckingham and Bletchley

Oving (historically /ˈuːvɪŋ/, more recently /ˈoʊvɪŋ/) is a village and also a civil parish within the Aylesbury Vale area of Buckinghamshire, England. It is located about three and a half miles north east of Waddesdon, four miles south of Winslow.

The village name is Anglo Saxon in origin, and means 'Ufa's people'. In the Domesday Book of 1086 the village was recorded as Olvonge, though previously it was known as Ulfingas. In manorial records in the 13th century it became known as Vuinges.

Oving was described in 1806 in Magna Britannia as follows:

OVING, in the hundred of Ashendon and deanery of Wendover, lies about six miles north-west of Aylesbury, and about a mile to the west of the road from that town to Buckingham. The manor of Oving was purchased, in 1735, of the family of Collins, by Francis Tyringham esq. after whose death it devolved to his elder sister Parnell, wife of Charles Pilsworth esq. M.P. for Aylesbury, who resided at Oving. Some time after Mr. Pilsworth's death it was sold to the late Richard Hopkins esq. one of the lords Commissioners of the Treasury, and was bequeathed by him to Colonel Richard Northey, who has since taken the name of Hopkins in addition, and has now the rank of major-general. The manor-house being situated on the brow of a hill forms a conspicuous object in the vale of Aylesbury. Another manor in Oving has passed with North Marston, and is now held under Magdalen College, in Oxford, by Francis Wastie esq. The rectory is in the gift of the crown.

The small parish church is dedicated to 'All Saints'. The village contains some attractive cottages especially in New Road.

The village has one public house known as 'The Black Boy', a quaint half-timbered construction under a tiled roof built c. 1524. The inn is situated in Church Lane opposite the village green.

The village is host to one of the oldest football cups the Oving Villages Cup, which started in 1889 and persists today on the recreation ground on Bowling Alley. The origins of this street name are unknown although it is believed by some locals that the name originates from farming terminology as a route by which cattle would travel through the village.

The village has community schemes such as Neighbourhood Watch, regular parish council meetings, mother and toddler groups, reading clubs, walking groups and youth clubs.

== Notable people ==
- Oscar Eckenstein, mountaineer and rock climber, lived briefly in Oving before his death from consumption in 1921.
