= Hedsor =

Village in Buckinghamshire, England

Coordinates: 51.570°N 0.681°W

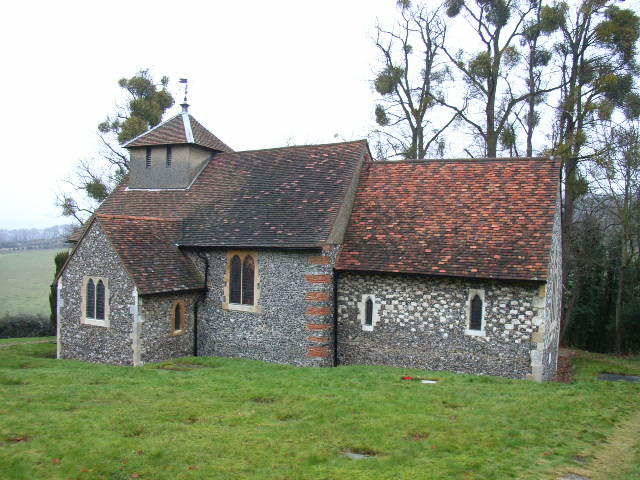
- St Nicholas' parish church

- Location within Buckinghamshire
- Population: 95
- OS grid reference: SU9187
- Civil parish: Hedsor
- Unitary authority: Buckinghamshire
- Ceremonial county: Buckinghamshire
- Region: South East
- Country: England
- Sovereign state: United Kingdom
- Post town: High Wycombe
- Postcode district: HP10
- Post town: Maidenhead
- Postcode district: SL6
- Post town: Bourne End
- Postcode district: SL8
- Dialling code: 01628
- Police: Thames Valley
- Fire: Buckinghamshire
- Ambulance: South Central
- UK Parliament: Beaconsfield

Hedsor is a small village and civil parish in Wycombe district in Buckinghamshire, England, in the very south of the county, near the River Thames and Bourne End. It is in the civil parish of Wooburn.

The village toponym is derived from the Old English for "Hædde's cliff", referring to the position of the village on a cliff overlooking the Thames.

Hedsor House was the ancient seat of the de Hedsor family, who took their name from the village. They owned it at the time of the Domesday Book in 1086. The modern manor house was built in 1778, and stands on a hill in the village with a commanding view of the Thames and of Berkshire.

In 1583 Rowland Hynd built a new Tudor manor house at Hedsor which was badly damaged by fire in 1795 and eventually demolished in 1865. At about this time the fourth Lord Boston commissioned the architect James Knowles to design a new house at Hedsor.

Hedsor House remained as the Boston family's country house until early in the 20th century, during which time Queen Victoria was said to be a frequent visitor to the house and its beautiful surrounding parkland.

Rowland Hynd had the Church of England parish church of Saint Nicholas "re-edified" in 1608.
