= Hitcham, Buckinghamshire =

Village in Buckinghamshire, England

Coordinates: 51.5346°N 0.6749°W

Hitcham
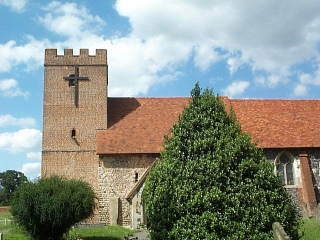
- St Mary's Church

- Location within Buckinghamshire
- Civil parish: Burnham
- Unitary authority: Buckinghamshire
- Ceremonial county: Buckinghamshire
- Region: South East
- Country: England
- Sovereign state: United Kingdom

Hitcham was a village in Buckinghamshire, England. Today it is indistinguishable from the extended village of Burnham and is no longer marked on Ordnance Survey 1:50000 maps as a separate settlement. It is to the west of Burnham, close to the village of Taplow, and adjacent to the common on which Burnham Beeches stands.

The village name 'Hitcham' is Anglo Saxon in origin, and means 'Hycga's homestead'. In the Domesday Book of 1086 the village was recorded as Hucheham.

In 1931 the parish had a population of 886. The civil parish of Hitcham was abolished on 1 April 1934 under a County Review Order, with the urban part going to Burnham parish, a larger but less populous part going to Taplow, and a tiny sliver going to Dorney.

The road Hitcham Lane still exists, and features Hitcham House, a large Manor House, now subdivided into several private residential properties.
