= Hedsor House =

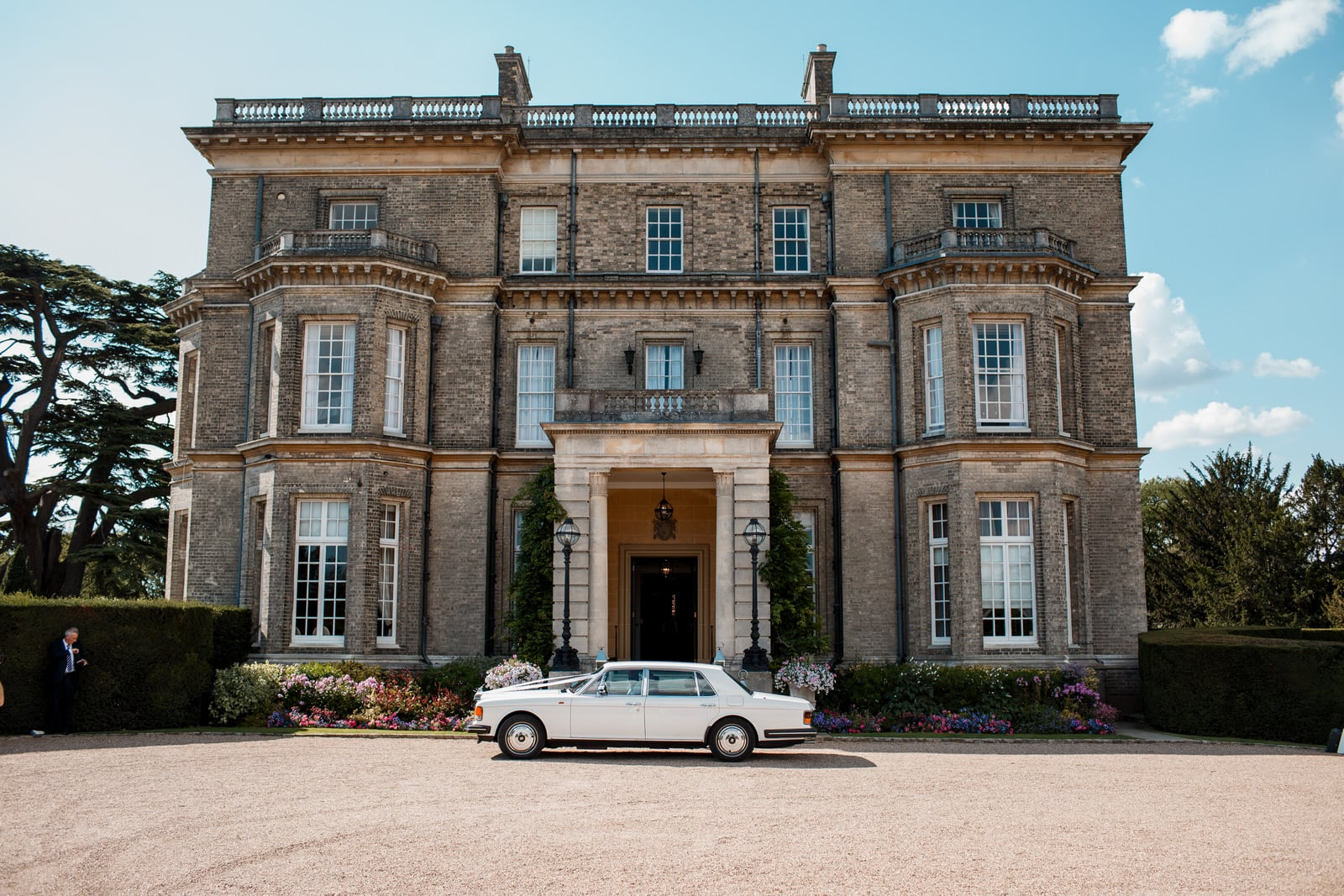

- Location within Buckinghamshire Location within England

General information
- Status: Completed
- Type: country house
- Architectural style: Italianate
- Location: Hedsor, Buckinghamshire, England
- Coordinates: 51.5656°N 0.6914°W
- Construction started: 1166

Hedsor House is an Italianate-style mansion in the United Kingdom, located in Hedsor in Buckinghamshire. Perched overlooking the River Thames, a manor house at Hedsor can be dated back to 1166 when the estate was owned by the de Hedsor Family. In the 18th century, it was the royal residence of Princess Augusta, Dowager Princess of Wales.

== History ==
Hedsor, which dates back to 1166, was once the home of Princess Augusta, Dowager Princess of Wales, mother of George III and the founder of Kew Gardens. The house and its 85-acre park overlooking the Thames then regularly welcomed the Kings and Queens from Windsor Castle as the home of Lord Boston from 1764.

The house was originally designed by Sir William Chambers, architect of Somerset House in London, with the aid of George III and Queen Charlotte, who picked the location specifically for its position high above the Thames. Badly damaged by fire in 1795, a new house was completed in 1868 by James Knowles, unusually modelled on the Italian villa style but with a domed hall rather than an open courtyard.

King George III and later, Queen Victoria were both frequent visitors, with Baron Boston building the Hedsor Folly to commemorate King George's victory at the Battle of Waterloo in 1815.

== Current ==
The present house was built in the Italianate style. The house is at the end of a kilometre-long private drive in an 85-acre (34-hectare) estate. The surrounding park is Grade II listed on the English Heritage National Register of Historic Parks and Gardens.

In 1934, Philip and Florence Shephard were given Hedsor House as their wedding present by Philip's father.

In the 1950s, Hedsor House was leased by the US Air Force as a Cold War military spy base.

The 1960s, the house was leased as a conference centre for International Computers Limited (ICL). Management courses were run by ICL with overnight accommodation in rooms in the house and the stable yard. The company only leased the house and the immediate grounds for parking. The bulk of the site was out of bounds.

The house is now used for weddings and corporate events and is run by the 4th generation of the Shephard family.

== Hedsor Park ==
Hedsor Park is the listed historic park that surrounds Hedsor House. Regularly visited by Queen Victoria, Hedsor Park is listed under English Heritage Register of Parks and Gardens of Special Historic Interest in England Grade II.

== Parties ==
The house has hosted many celebrity parties including David Beckham, Victoria Beckham, Elton John, Jason Statham, George Clooney, Keira Knightley amongst others.

In September 2008, Mark Ronson held his 33rd birthday at Madonna and Guy Ritchie’s pub The Punch Bowl, Mayfair, London, and Hedsor House, including Amy Winehouse, Lily Allen, Daisy Lowe, Nick Grimshaw, and The Kaiser Chiefs.

== Filming ==
The house has been used as a film location for both television dramas and feature films including The Golden Compass, Fleabag, A Touch of Cloth and Spooks. It was used to represent The White House in The Special Relationship and Downing Street in The Day of the Triffids. It was also used for a MTV reality show The Girls of Hedsor Hall, based on the British reality series Ladette to Lady. and the music videos for Jay Sean's song "Down" and Zara Larsson's song "Ain't My Fault". It featured Tom Hardy in the 2015 film Legend and 2016 as the mansion to which George Clooney is taken when kidnapped in a Nespresso advert.

=== Quartet ===
It was also the location of Quartet, a 2012 comedy drama film directed by Dustin Hoffman, based on the play by Ronald Harwood. It was filmed primarily at Hedsor House, in Autumn 2011. St. Nicholas' Church in Taplow was also used for filming. The film stars Maggie Smith, Tom Courtenay, Pauline Collins and Billy Connolly. Hedsor House features as "Beecham House", the retirement home for professional musicians.

=== Mortdecai ===
Hedsor House was also used as one of the locations for the 2015 film Mortdecai, an action comedy film directed by David Koepp which starred Johnny Depp and Gwyneth Paltrow.

== Awards ==
Hedsor House is registered as a wedding venue. It was included in a list of "Top 10 Regal Wedding Venues in the UK" by The Times.
