= Whaplode =

Village and civil parish in the South Holland district of Lincolnshire, England

Coordinates: 52.800180°N 0.036984°W

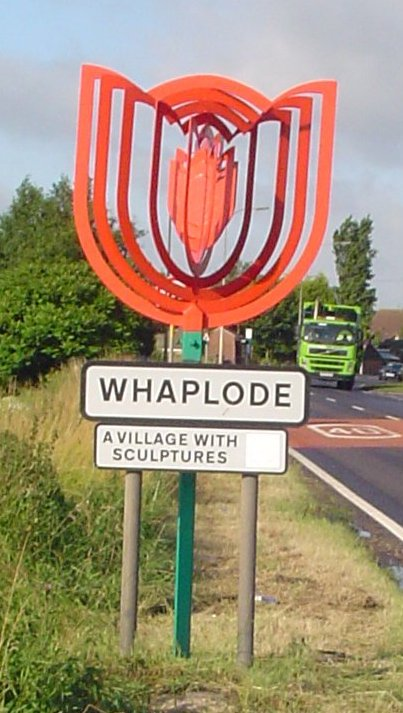
- Village sign

- Location within Lincolnshire
- Population: 3,505 (2011)
- OS grid reference: TF324243
  - London: 90 mi (140 km) S
- District: South Holland
- Shire county: Lincolnshire
- Region: East Midlands
- Country: England
- Sovereign state: United Kingdom
- Post town: Spalding
- Postcode district: PE12
- Police: Lincolnshire
- Fire: Lincolnshire
- Ambulance: East Midlands
- UK Parliament: South Holland and The Deepings

Whaplode is a village and civil parish in the South Holland district of Lincolnshire, England. It is just west of the Prime Meridian. The parish includes the village of Whaplode Drove, and the hamlets of Shepeau Stow, Dowsdale, Whaplode St Catherine, and Saracen's Head.

== History ==
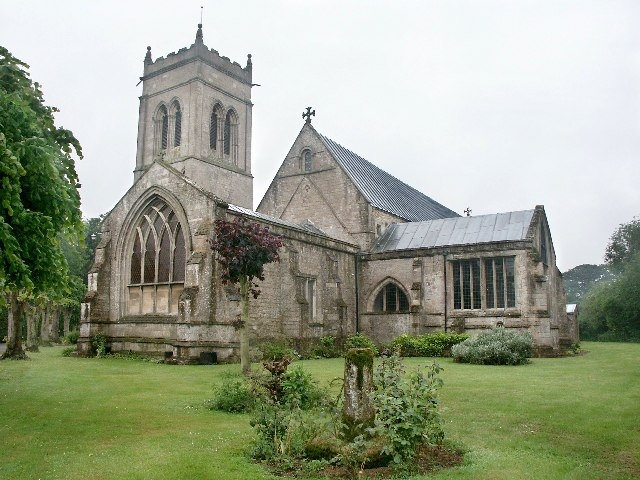
St Mary's Church, Whaplode

The name 'Whaplode' derives from the Old English cwappa-lad meaning 'Eelpout watercourse'.

Because of the historical development of the area, other local places use 'Whaplode' as part of their name. When the parishes were originally laid out, a thousand or so years ago, in order to give each enough resources to provide a living, they were made long and narrow. In this way each parish had its share of marsh for pasture and perhaps salt making, Townland for arable farming, and fen for fowling, thatch and turf. As the wetlands were reclaimed other settlements were made in the newly inhabitable places. In Whaplode parish these outlying places are Whaplode St Catherine (TF3420) and Whaplode Drove (TF3113). The village used to have a railway station to the south of the village on the former Midland and Great Northern Joint Railway.

== Governance ==
Whaplode is part of Whaplode and Holbeach St John's electoral ward. The total population of the ward taken at the 2011 census was 4,347.

== Geography ==
Whaplode is situated on the A151 road. 2 miles (3 km) west from Holbeach and 4 miles (6 km) east from Spalding.

In old documents the village it is sometimes spelt "Whapload". The main village lies on the marine silt ridge, known as the Townlands, which rises between the former salt marsh and the former fen to be found around The Wash. This ridge follows the A151 road. Its neighbours on the Townlands are Holbeach and Moulton. Whaplode St Catherine is a hamlet in Whaplode parish.

== Amenities ==
The village church is dedicated to Saint Mary. The village is situated on the A151 High Road. A Co-op store is part of a Gulf garage on the A151.

Whaplode has the highest ratio of sculptures to residents of any settlement in Lincolnshire.
