= Genereux =

== Genereux Name Meaning ==
Genereux is a surname. French (Généreux): nickname from généreux ‘generous’, ‘giving’.

== Notable people ==
Notable people with the name include:

- Arline Généreux (1897–1987)
- George Genereux (1935–1989)
- Jacques Généreux (born 1956)
- Bernard Généreux (born 1962)
- Jean-Marc Généreux (born 1962)
- Maurice Généreux, Canadian physician
- Michael Genereux, Guamanian spearfisher

== Genealogy ==
=== Surname Variations ===
- Generas
- Generau
- Generaux
- Genereaux
- Genereux
- Genero
- Generous
- Genro
- Jenereaux
- Jenero
- Jemeroux
- Jenro

== See also ==
- French ship Généreux
- R v Généreux
- Cadeaux Genereux
