= Action of 7 February 1813 =

1813 battle of the Napoleonic Wars

- Part of the Napoleonic Wars
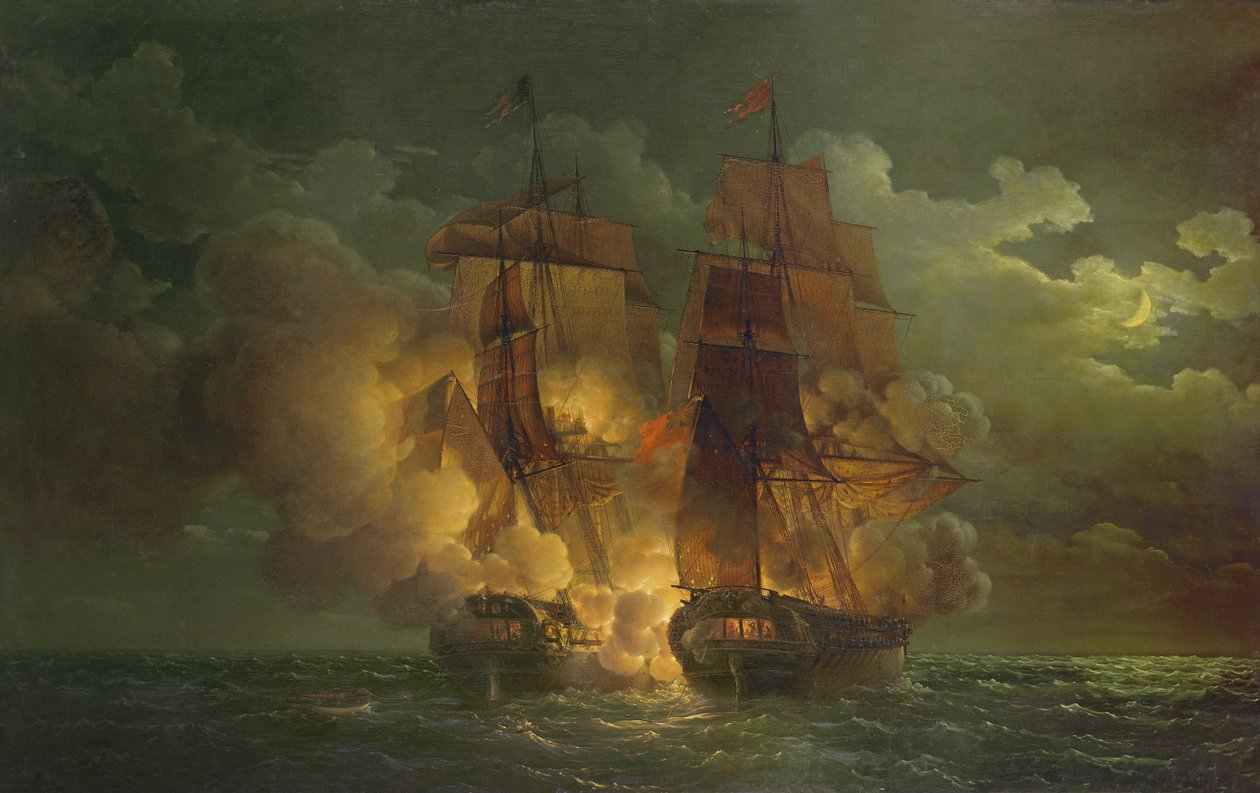
- Painting of the action by Louis-Philippe Crépin
Date	7 February 1813
Location	Off Îles de Los, Atlantic Ocean 09°18′N 14°00′W
Result	Inconclusive

Belligerents
United Kingdom	France

Commanders and leaders
Frederick Irby (WIA)	Pierre Bouvet

Strength
1 frigate	1 frigate

Casualties and losses
51 killed 90 wounded	20 killed 98 wounded
- Location within Africa

In the action of 7 February 1813, two evenly matched frigates of the French Imperial Navy and Royal Navy, Aréthuse and HMS Amelia, engaged in a battle in the Atlantic Ocean at the Îles de Los, off Guinea. The action lasted four hours, causing significant damage and casualties to both opponents, and resulted in a stalemate. The two ships parted and returned to their respective ports of call, with both sides claiming victory.

== Background ==
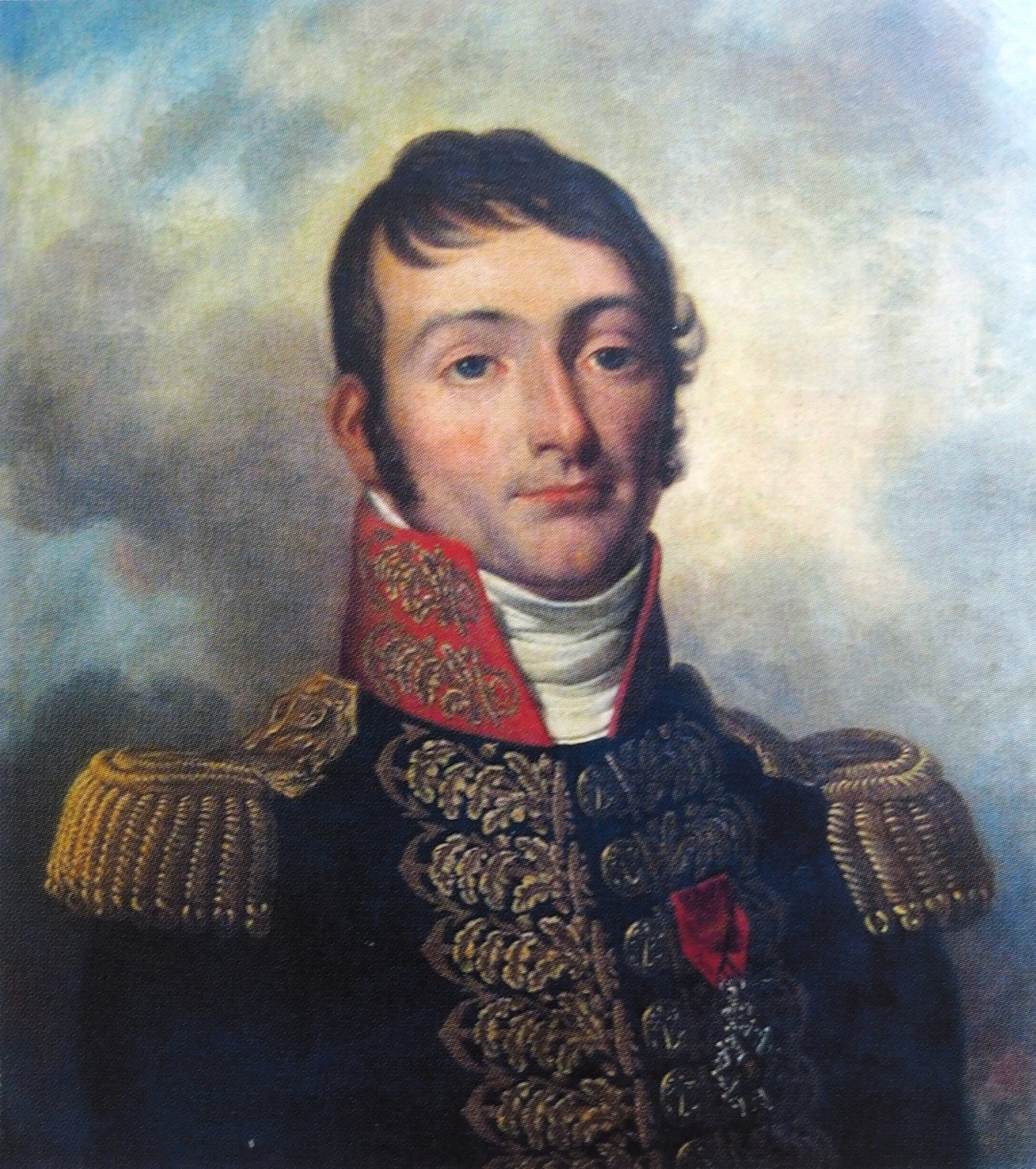
Portrait of Pierre François Étienne Bouvet de Maisonneuve

After the British victory in the Mauritius campaign of 1809–1811, all French possessions in the Indian Ocean were controlled by the British. France had already lost the use of Cape Town in 1806 after the battles of Blaauwberg and Batavia in 1811, with the British Invasion of Java. Thus, in 1813, the French Navy lacked the advance bases it needed to support the commerce raiding frigate squadron that it had operated in the previous decade. It was therefore decided to send a force to the western coast of Africa to disrupt British shipping closer to the metropole, while still being far enough away to be beyond the reach of the powerful British naval divisions that blockaded the English Channel and the Bay of Biscay. To this end, a frigate division was given to Captain Pierre François Étienne Bouvet de Maisonneuve, a skilled frigate commander, (Note: James (p. 189) credits Bouvet as being "one of the best officers in the French navy".) veteran of the Mauritius campaign and leader of the French forces during the second half of the Battle of Grand Port. The squadron comprised the 40-gun frigate Aréthuse, under Bouvet himself, and Rubis, under Commander Louis-François Ollivier. Another two-frigate squadron, made up of Elbe and Hortense, was to perform the same mission with a two-week interval.

On 25 November 1812, Bouvet's division departed from Nantes, slipped through the British blockade, and established a station to the north-east of the Azores, near the group of five rocks called "Vigie des Cinq Grosses-Têtes" (44°17'N, 21°45'W). The frigates then continued to cruise off Madeira and Cape Verde. During January, due to continual gales and preliminary symptoms of a fever epidemic, Bouvet decided to sail south with two prizes, the British cutter Hawk, and the Portuguese slave ship Serra, to anchor at the Îles de Los, off Sierra Leone. On 27 January, the frigates and their prizes came in view of the islands when the 16-gun HMS Daring, under Lieutenant William Pascoe, appeared. Mistaking the French frigates for British cruisers, Daring launched a boat towards Rubis, which altered her course to intercept; as the frigate approached, the crew realised their error and attempted to flee, to no avail. Questioning his prisoners, Ollivier learnt the identity of his opponent, and gave chase. Hopelessly outmanned and outgunned, Pascoe threw his brig on the coast, on the north-western point of Tamara, and scuttled her by fire. Daring's magazines detonated at 17:00, and the French frigates dropped anchor one hour later.

Ashore, the French collected fruit, resupplied their fresh water, and gathered intelligence on the British deployment: the station of Sierra Leone comprised two frigates and several corvettes, but only HMS Amelia was anchored in the bay at the time. After six days of repairs and resupply, Aréthuse and Rubis were ready for a six-month cruise; to unburden himself of his prisoners and prizes, Bouvet returned Serra to the Portuguese, and on 29 January, the British were released on parole and sent to Sierra Leone on Hawk. Bouvet departed on 4 February. (Note: Troude (p. 171) say on the 1st; Lecomte (p. 293) says the 4th; Roche (p. 390) dates the destruction of Rubis to the 5th, entailing that her departure was on the 4th; The Fonds Marine (p. 477) concurs with Roche.) Meanwhile, on 29 January, Lieutenant Pascoe had arrived at Freetown, with some of his men, and informed Amelia of the presence of what he believed to be three French frigates at Tamara. Hawk arrived the same evening with the prisoners on parole, confirming Pascoe's account; she was then equipped with a boat from Amelia and sent for a reconnaissance of the French squadron. Having volunteered, Pascoe returned with—this time—an accurate description of the French division, including the names of the frigates and their prize. On 3 February, at 10:30, Amelia departed her anchorage and took the direction of the Îles de Los to intercept the French squadron.

At the Îles de Los, Aréthuse had, upon departure, maneuvered to catch the wind and struck the bottom, breaking her rudder and forcing the squadron to drop anchor on the spot. That very night, a violent storm broke out, and both frigates broke their cables. Aréthuse managed to avoid running aground using a makeshift rudder, and in the morning found herself twelve miles to the north-west of Tamara; Bouvet dropped anchor as soon as he found the bottom to repair his rudder. Meanwhile, Rubis had been cast aground on the shore of Tamara. At ten, she fired distress shots and signals; Aréthuse launched her longboat to assist, but could not maneuver herself without her rudder; the launch carried two additional pumps to Rubis, but returned with the news that she was unsalvageable and that her crew was transferring on Serra. The following night, the hull of the stranded Rubis broke under the stress of the waves. Commander Ollivier scuttled her by fire and embarked his crew on Serra. On 5 January, around 20:00, Amelia sighted a strange sail making night signals which, the next morning, turned out to be Princess-Charlotte, a government schooner from Sierra Leone. Amelia got sight of the French squadron half an hour later, and dispatched Princess-Charlotte to Sierra Leone to instruct any incoming British warship to come to her aid at once. She then observed what was deemed to be a prize being unloaded into one of the frigates, but was in fact Rubis transferring her crew to Serra, and the second frigate in the distance.

== Battle ==
Painting of Amelia chasing Aréthuse

In the morning of 6 February, while Aréthuse was completing her repairs, HMS Amelia appeared under the wind. Bouvet set sails to meet her and in the evening, the frigates sailed on parallel courses. As Irby was not aware of the demise of Rubis, he was attempting to lure Aréthuse away from her to prevent the two French frigates from supporting each other. Aréthuse having a slight advantage, and hoping to overhaul his opponent during the night, Bouvet hoisted the French colours and fired a carronade; Amelia answered by hoisting the Union Jack and firing a shot. At dawn, a fog obscured the frigates from each other, and Bouvet could not engage. The next morning, Aréthuse found herself alone on the sea, and Bouvet followed the course that he assumed Amelia had taken; around eleven, she appeared on the horizon and Aréthuse put on all sails to give chase. The frigates raced all day and at 19:30, Irby decided that he was far enough to avoid interference from Rubis, and Amelia turned to confront her opponent. Aréthuse was pierced for 44 guns, but actually mounted only 42: as her two foremost guns, obstructed by bollards, could not be maneuvered properly, Bouvet had ordered them stored in the hold. This left Aréthuse with twenty-six 18-pounder long guns, two 8-pounder chase guns, and fourteen 24-pounder carronades. Amelia mounted twenty-six 18-pounders and twenty 32-pounder carronades. Her crew was reinforced by that of Daring.

The frigates closed in to pistol range without opening fire. As they passed each other, Aréthuse came about and fired her broadside at Amelia that cut the braces of her topsail; Amelia answered in kind, and then veered and abruptly decreased her speed, her davit touching Aréthuse at starboard. Aréthuse fired another broadside at point-blank range, and for the following hour and a half, the two frigates remained entangled, exchanging volleys, gunners from both sides snatching the ramrods of their opponents and duelling with sabres from one gunport and the other, but neither side attempting to board the other. After 90 minutes of cannonade and gunfire, Captain Irby and his two lieutenants, John James Bates and John Pope, were wounded. The third lieutenant, George Wells, was killed soon after taking command, and the master of Amelia, Anthony De Mayne, replaced him. Then, Bouvet attempted a boarding to decide the issue, but with her clewlines cut by shots, Aréthuse could not maneuver. At 21:00, the frigates separated. The cannonade continued until 23:00, when the frigates lost contact. Soon, a dense fog hid the frigates one from another, and it was not until the next morning that Amelia was spotted again. According to Bouvet's report, Aréthuse attempted to give chase, but to no avail.

== Aftermath ==
1822 portrait of Frederick Paul Irby

Each captain accused the other of having fled. Irby stated that Aréthuse "bore up, having the advantage of being able to do so, leaving us in an ungovernable state"; while Bouvet wrote "At eleven o'clock, firing ceased on both sides; we were no longer in range; and the enemy, putting on all sail, surrendered the battlefield to us". (Note: "A onze heures, le feu cessa de part et d'autre; nous n'étions plus à bonne portée, et l'ennemi se couvrit de voiles, nous abandonnant le champ de bataille." Original quoted in James, p. 187, with a few errors. Translation from the original. Bouvet's complete report is available at lebardeschoufs.com) Another view is that the ships, their riggings both damaged, simply drifted away from each other under the effect of the cannonade. Aréthuse had 20 killed and 98 wounded. (Note: Quintin (p. 86) gives a figure of 88 wounded; James (p. 188) gives a somehow different figure of 31 killed and 74 wounded.) Amelia suffered 51 killed and 90 wounded.

Bouvet sailed to Tamara, where he rejoined Serra and the crew of Rubis on the 10th. Serra was taken in tow for a few days before Bouvet scuttled her by fire, off Madeira, as she retarded Aréthuse. Aréthuse returned to Saint-Malo with no further encounter, where she arrived on 19 April 1813. During their mission, Rubis and Aréthuse had captured ten prizes. (Note: James (p. 190) gives a figure of fifteen prizes.) Irby sailed to England, where he had been bound before the battle to repatriate sick sailors. He arrived at Spithead on 22 March, carrying large quantities of gold. Navy Minister Decrès gave a mixed review of the events. On one hand, he praised Bouvet's bravery and conduct during the battle itself; in his report of the events, on 26 April 1813, he wrote:

This fight leaves well behind that of Belle Poule in 1778, that of Nymphe in 1780 and all the others, that have had more or less fame. I request from Your Majesty permission to commission on government funds a painting of this battle. (Note: "Ce combat laisse loin derrière lui celui de la Belle Poule en 1778, celui de la Nymphe en 1780 et tous les autres, qui ont eu plus ou moins de célébrité. Je demande à Votre Majesté, la permission de faire aux frais du Gouvernement le tableau de ce combat."Quoted in Granier, p. 355.)

Louis-Philippe Crépin did paint a 258 by 162 cm (102 by 64 in) depiction of the battle, which is in the collections of the Musée de Versailles.

On the other hand, Decrès sharply criticised Bouvet for the wreck of Rubis and near-loss of Aréthuse in the storm of 5 February:

While giving him his due for his brilliant valour and his good results, I am not allowed to hide from Your Majesty that a sailor of long experience would not have, as he did, put the two frigates in distress at the îles de Los. This opinion is not only mine, it was cast by all to whom I communicated the report. (Note: "Tout en rendant justice à son éclatante valeur et à ses beaux résultats, il ne m'est pas permis de dissimuler à Votre Majesté qu'un marin de vieille expérience n'eût pas mis, comme il l'a fait, les deux frégates en perdition aux îles de Los. Cette opinion n'est pas seulement la mienne, elle a été émise par tous ceux à qui j'ai donné connaissance du rapport.")

Probably because of these mixed reviews, Bouvet was awarded the rank of officer in the Legion of Honour, on 2 July, but was neither promoted to rear-admiral, nor made a Baron of the Empire, as had been requested in his favour.

== Notes and references ==
=== Bibliography ===
- Granier, Hubert (1998). Histoire des Marins français 1789–1815. illustrations by Alain Coz. Marines éditions. ISBN 2-909675-41-6.
- James, William (1837) The Naval History of Great Britain, 1793–1820, Volume VI, R. Bentley, London.
- Lecomte, Jules (1836). Chroniques de la marine française: de 1789 à 1830, d'après les documents officiels (in French). Vol. 5. H. Souverain.
- Maiseau, Raymond-Balthasar (1833). Annuaire du commerce maritime (in French).
- Quintin, Danielle; Quintin, Bernard (2003). Dictionnaire des capitaines de Vaisseau de Napoléon (in French). S.P.M. ISBN 2-901952-42-9.
- Roche, Jean-Michel (2005). Dictionnaire des bâtiments de la flotte de guerre française de Colbert à nos jours. Vol. 1. Group Retozel-Maury Millau. ISBN 978-2-9525917-0-6. OCLC 165892922.
- Troude, Onésime-Joachim (1867). Batailles navales de la France (in French). Vol. 4. Challamel ainé.
- Fonds Marine. Campagnes (opérations; divisions et stations navales; missions diverses). Inventaire de la sous-série Marine BB4. Tome deuxième : BB4 1 à 482 (1790–1826)
