= French brig Entreprenant =

History

France
- Name: Entreprenant
- Namesake: "Enterprising"
- Builder: Grisard, Port-Napoléon (Port-Louis), Île de France
- Laid down: May 1808
- Launched: August 1808
- Captured: 2 December 1810
- Fate: Broken up

General characteristics
- Displacement: 160 tons unloaded, 300 tons loaded (French)
- Length: 26.63 m (87.4 ft) (overall); 22.98 m (75.4 ft) (keel)
- Beam: 8.12 m (26.6 ft)
- Draught: Unloaded: 3.56 m (11.7 ft); Loaded:4.06 m (13.3 ft)
- Complement: 88-110
- Armament: 12 × 12-pounder guns

Entreprenant was a French ship, the third under the same name and with the same captain in the period 1807–1810. She served in the East Indies until the British captured her in 1810 and then had her broken up as unfit for further service.

== Career ==
Lieutenant de vaisseau Pierre Bouvet had a "brig gourable" constructed at Isle de France in 1808. (Note: A gourable (or grab) was an Indian Ocean design, having a massive, high stern and a pointed, low bow, the widest point being at the beam, and being rigged similarly to a ketch. See also: Grab.) This vessel received the name Entreprenant, and was commissioned under Bouvet's command. (Immediately prior, he had commanded the Entreprenant and the naval felucca Entreprenant.)

Entrerprenant was fitted out in March–May 1808 and provisioned with supplies for a six-month cruise.

Bouvet sailed Entreprenant on 4 October 1808 with despatches for Ormuz. She then cruised off the Malabar Coast, taking 19 prizes, with Bouvet having to suppress a mutiny. He returned to Isle de France on 16 March 1809.

In May 1809, Bouvet was sent to Manila to investigate the fate of Mouche n° 6, under Lieutenant Ducrest de Villeneuve, which had been sent there a few months before and had not returned. On 28 August, Entreprenant reached Manila and learned that Borneo had sided for the Allies and interned the crew of Mouche n° 6. Furthermore, the 14-gun HMS Antelope was anchored at Cavite. Anchoring his ship offshore under a flag of truce, Bouvet sent a delegation to demand the release of the crew of Mouche n° 6, with orders to return to Entreprenant as soon as the message was delivered. However, the delegation had still not returned the next morning.

In order to obtain a clear casus belli, Bouvet anchored his ship at the entrance of Manila Bay, but stayed ready to set sail. Soon, Antelope and shore batteries opened up on Entreprenant, which promptly retreated. Bouvet sailed to Corregidor Island and endeavored to blockade all shipping bound for Manila. After collecting enough prisoners in this way, on 3 September, he released them on parole under promise not to navigate at sea before Mouche n° 6 would be released. Bouvet had them convey his ultimatum that if his conditions were not met the next day, he would attack the coasts of the island. The French crew detained in Manila was promptly released and returned to Entreprenant.

On 20 October, Entreprenant encountered a British convoy and detected an isolated sail, which she intercepted by 23:00. The ship was the 18-gun Portuguese merchant vessel Ovidor. She surrendered after the first broadside and was brought to Isle de France with a valuable cargo of Chinese goods and 200,000 piastres. Ovidor, a 550-tonne ship, was brought into French service as Généreux. Oviedo Pereira (or Ovidor, or Ovidor Pereira, or Ovidour), was returning from Macau with $400,000 in silver, the proceeds of last season's trade. A newspaper report in England states that Ovidor Pereira was captured near the mouth of the Strait of Malacca. (Note: In 1810 Governor Decaen of Île de France had coins struck from the silver captured with Ovidor. These came to be known as Decaen piastres.)

In the wake of the Battle of Grand Port, at midnight on 21 August 1810, Entreprenant was sent, along with Jacques Hamelin's squadron comprising the frigates Vénus, Manche and Astrée, to support the squadron under Guy-Victor Duperré. Entreprenant arrived first at the entrance of the harbour, where she encountered Iphigenia, under Captain Henry Lambert, which was limping out of the port; the three frigates sailing behind crushed all hopes for Lambert to escape, and he surrendered. Entreprenant was sent to search for HMS Staunch but did not find her; Entreprenant did recapture Mouche n°23, taken by the British in June. (Note: Mouche n°23, under the command of Enseigne de vaisseau Gautier, had been sent out from Bayonne on 18 September 1809 to carry dispatches to Isle de France. Other French records attribute the recapture to Astree.)

== Fate ==
Entreprenant was at the island during the British invasion of Isle de France in November 1810. She was among the spoils of the campaign, but rather than take her into the Royal Navy, the British broke her up as unfit for further service.
