= Louis-François Ollivier =

French Navy officer (1770–1820)

Louis-François Ollivier (9 March 1770 – 11 September 1820) was a French Navy officer.

== Career ==
In 1809, Ollivier served as a lieutenant in the Escaut squadron. Along with Lieutenant Graton, he was tasked with a reconnaissance of the canals in Bruxelles and Bruges.

In 1812, promoted to commander, Ollivier was in command of the frigate Rubis. He chased the British brig HMS Daring off Tamara in February 1813 and forced her crew to scuttle the ship. Rubis was wrecked soon after, and her consort Aréthuse repatriated her crew after the action of 7 February 1813.

In 1816, Ollivier commanded the frigate Revanche, on which ferried a Navy official, Marine Bourilhon, to Saint-Pierre et Miquelon, before returning to Brest. The next year, he transported troops, despatches and convicts between France and Martinique.
