= Decaen piastre =

The Decaen piastre was a coin that Governor Decaen had minted at Île of France in 1810. He entrusted the coining to the artist "sieur Aveline", who designed the coins and whose name appears on them. The coins are of 10 livres and dated 1810; they were referred to as Piastres Decaen.

The silver for the coining came from 200 to 230,000 dollars that the Portuguese ship Ovidor Pereira was carrying from Macao when Lieutenant de vaisseau Pierre Bouvet of French brig Entreprenant (1808) captured her in the Straits of Malacca on 20 October 1809.
