= French ship Généreux (1810) =

History

Portugal
- Name: Ouvidor Pereira
- Captured: October 1809

France
- Name: Généreux
- Acquired: 1810 by purchase of a prize
- Fate: Broken up 1838

General characteristics
- Displacement: Unloaded:559 tons (French); Loaded: 900 tons loaded (French)
- Length: 37.35 m (122.5 ft)
- Beam: 9.74 m (32.0 ft)
- Draught: 4.27 m (14.0 ft)
- Depth of hold: 4.90 m (16.1 ft)
- Complement: 35-135
- Armament: Portuguese: 18 × 12-pounder guns; 1810:12 × 12-pounder guns; 1812:6 × 8-pounder + 6 × 4-pounder guns; 1814:20 × 8-pounder guns; 1827:2 × 6-pounder guns + 10 × 18-pounder carronades
- Notes: Teak-built, with iron bolts and copper sheathing

Généreux was originally the Portuguese merchantman Ouvidor Pereira (i.e. "Magistrate Pereira", often simply L'Ovidor in French sources, and frequently Ovidor Pereira in contemporary English records). Captured by Entreprenant in 1809, the French navy took her into service as Généreux. In 1814 she was renamed Loire. She was decommissioned at Brest in July 1838 and struck from the lists in August before being broken up.

== Design and construction ==
The exact origins of the Ouvidor Pereira are not clear, but it is reported that her hull was built of teak, indicating an origin in the Indian Ocean area, where the Portuguese had a sizeable shipyard at Daman. She was nonetheless built in a broadly European style, with iron fastenings and copper sheathing, rigged as a three-masted ship, and although not primarily a warship, she was armed with broadsides of up to ten pairs of 12-pounder long guns, and could carry a crew as large as 160 men. The ship is described as a very good sailor, able to keep pace with the brig-rigged French corvette Entreprenant, which in turn could comfortably outperform most frigates.

French sources reported the ship's size at 115 pieds du roi in length by 30 pieds in beam (approximately 122 feet 6 inches (37.34 m) by 32 feet (9.8 m), though these figures may be distorted by rounding in the original measurements). She was not as large as an East Indiaman, but was nonetheless around the size of a small frigate.

== Portuguese career ==
Contemporary records show the Ouvidor Pereira trading between India and China in the first years of the nineteenth century. In January 1803, she arrived from Macau, then an outpost of the Portuguese Empire, at Calcutta, then part of British India. The Calcutta Monthly Journal for March 1803 then records that she departed for the return voyage to Macau on 20 March the same year, and gives her captain's name as Vasconcellos. In early 1809 she brought George Baring, the British East India Company's Commission Agent in China, to Calcutta from Macau, together with his family. On 10 March 1803, she set sail for her return to Macau, reportedly with "a cargo to the enormous value of fourteen lacs of rupees", and joined an eastbound convoy of British ships under the escort of HMS Samarang.

At Macau, the ship loaded an impressive cargo of silver coin, its value variously reported in the British press, but more precisely counted after the ship's capture by the French at 230,000 Piastres, plus a valuable additional cargo of Chinese goods; the crew is stated at 160 men, a very large muster for a civilian vessel. For additional protection, she sailed with a large British convoy under the escort of the Royal Navy frigate HMS Dedaigneuse.

== Capture by France ==
On 20 October 1809, frustrated with their slow sailing, the Ouvidor opted to leave the convoy, and proceeded ahead under full sail down the east side of the Malay Peninsula. However, she was almost immediately seen by the French corvette Entreprenant, under the command of Lieutenant de vaisseau Pierre Bouvet, which was anchored off Aur Island, a fast-sailing brig with a powerful broadside of long 12-pounders. The French corvette promptly gave chase, but in doing so, she also came in sight of the convoy to the north, and the escorting Royal Navy frigate shook out her sails to pursue her in turn - the result was that the Ouvidor was being chased by Entreprenant, which was in turn being chased by HMS Dedaigneuse. Bouvet noted that the fast-sailing Entreprenant hardly gained on the Portuguese ship over the course of the day, but when dusk arrived, the Portuguese ship turned west to enter the Straits of Malacca, and shortened to topsails. The Entreprenant continued under full sail through the shallows close to the Malay coast, into an increasingly calm and foggy night, and around 11 o' clock at night, came on the Ouvidor again, looming like a mountain in the darkness.

The Portuguese ship surrendered after the first broadside and Bouvet spent the night and the first part of the next day shifting half of her bullion cargo aboard the Entreprenant, to maximise the odds of returning at least part of the treasure to French territory; the two ships made their careful way into the straits through the southern channel behind Pedra Branca, and watched the Dedaigneuse and the rest of the convoy sail past a few miles to their north. At the request of the masters and crew of Ovidor Pereira and Mary, another ship that Bouvet had captured, he put them on shore at Dutch-controlled Madura Island. They remained there on parole for six months and then received the governor's permission to charter an Arab ketch that took them to Malacca.

The Ouvidor was placed under the command of Ensigne de vaisseau Vielch, and parted company from Entreprenant, with the two ships agreeing to make a mid-ocean rendezvous at the remote island of St. Brandon; Ouvidor arrived there in early December, to find Entreprenant shaking off two Royal Navy frigates, and together, the two ships ran the Royal Navy close blockade to arrive at Île de France. In 1810 Governor Decaen of Île de France had coins struck from the silver captured with Ovidor. These came to be known as Decaen piastres.

== French service ==
The French took Ouvidor Pereira into service and in September 1810 named her Généreux, refitting her at Île de France. One sources says she was recommissioned on there on 5 October, for use as a cartel to repatriate prisoners-of-war, though another source states that she had already sailed in this role on 20 September, heading to the British-held Cape of Good Hope. Whatever the precise date of her departure, she arrived at the Cape on 11 October, bringing 330 British prisoners-of-war, and after a protracted replenishment, set sail for the return voyage to Île de France on 4 December; thus she set sail too late to be caught in the British invasion of Île de France in December, and instead arrived at Rochefort, Charente-Maritime in early 1811.

On 2 March 1812 she was recommissioned, with her name being mis-recorded as Généreuse, now formally classified as a gabarre, a term used in the French for armed transports with relatively simple deck arrangements, for example lacking an orlop and/or quarterdeck. She was rebuilt in Rochefort from June 1813 to September 1814 In August 1814 she was renamed Loire and promoted to the flûte classification, used for transports with more frigate-like deck arrangements. She was also provisioned for an eight-month cruise.

On 30 August 1815 Loire was under the command of enseigne de vaisseau Vergos. She transported troops and munitions from Rochefort to Île Bourbon. She then returned to Île-d'Aix Roads with colonial produce.

On 28 December 1816 Loire was under the command of lieutenant de vaisseau Gicquel-Destouches. He sailed her from Île-d'Aix Roads to Saint-Louis, Senegal, and Gorée, and back.

Between 4 and 29 July 1817 Loire was under the command of lieutenant de vaisseau Guérin Des Essards. He sailed her from Île-d'Aix Roads to Dunkirk.

Between 27 September and 11 December 1819 Loire was under the command of lieutenant de vaisseau Robin. He carried Baron de Laussat (governor of French Guiana), and passengers from Île-d'Aix Roads to Guyanne. She then carried the former governor, Lieutenant General Carra-Saint Cyr, passengers, and dispatches from Cayenne to Fort-Royal, Martinique.

Lieutenant de vaisseau Robin commanded Loire from 7 March 1820 to 8 August. On 23 September she was under the command of capitaine de frégate Puis d'Oysonville. She sailed from Basse-Terre to Norfolk, Virginia. She then carried provisions and wood from Norfolk to Martinique. Next, she carried passengers and dispatches from Saint-Pierre and Basse-Terre to Île-d'Aix Roads. She then transported troops from Rochefort to the Îles du Vent. Loire was refitted again in Rochefort from August to November 1820.

Lieutenant de vaisseau Robin resumed command of Loire at Lorient between 6 January and 17 February 1821. Between 31 March and 3 April she was again under the command of capitaine de frégate d'Oysonville. He sailed her from Île-d'Aix Roads to Martinique and Basse-Terre, and back.

On 13 November 1821 the French Navy re-classed all its flûtes as corvettes de charge. However, in December 1822 she was instead listed as a gabarre.

Loire underwent refits at Brest in November 1827, in March 1832, and again in September 1833.

== Fate ==
Loire was decommissioned at Brest on 1 July 1838 and her crew was transferred to Aube. She was struck from the lists on 8 August and broken up thereafter.
