= Wanstead (disambiguation) =

Wanstead is an area of east London, England.

Wanstead may also refer to:

- Wanstead, Barbados, a populated place
- Wanstead, Ontario, an area of Plympton–Wyoming, Canada
- Wanstead (ship), several vessels of this name
- Wanstead tube station, a London Underground station
