= French ship Généreux =

Several vessels have served the French Navy under the name Généreux, for "generous":

- French ship Généreux (1785) was a French Téméraire-class 74-gun ship of the line. The British Royal Navy captured her and she finished her career as HMS Généreux.
- French ship Généreux (1810) was the Portuguese merchantman Ovidor Pereira that Entreprenant captured in 1809. The French navy took Ovidor Pereira into service as Généreux. In 1814 her name became Loire. She was decommissioned at Brest in July 1838 and struck from the lists in August before being broken up.
- French ship Généreux (1831) was a Téméraire-class 74-gun ship of the line.
