= Pierre François Étienne Bouvet de Maisonneuve =

French Navy officer and privateer

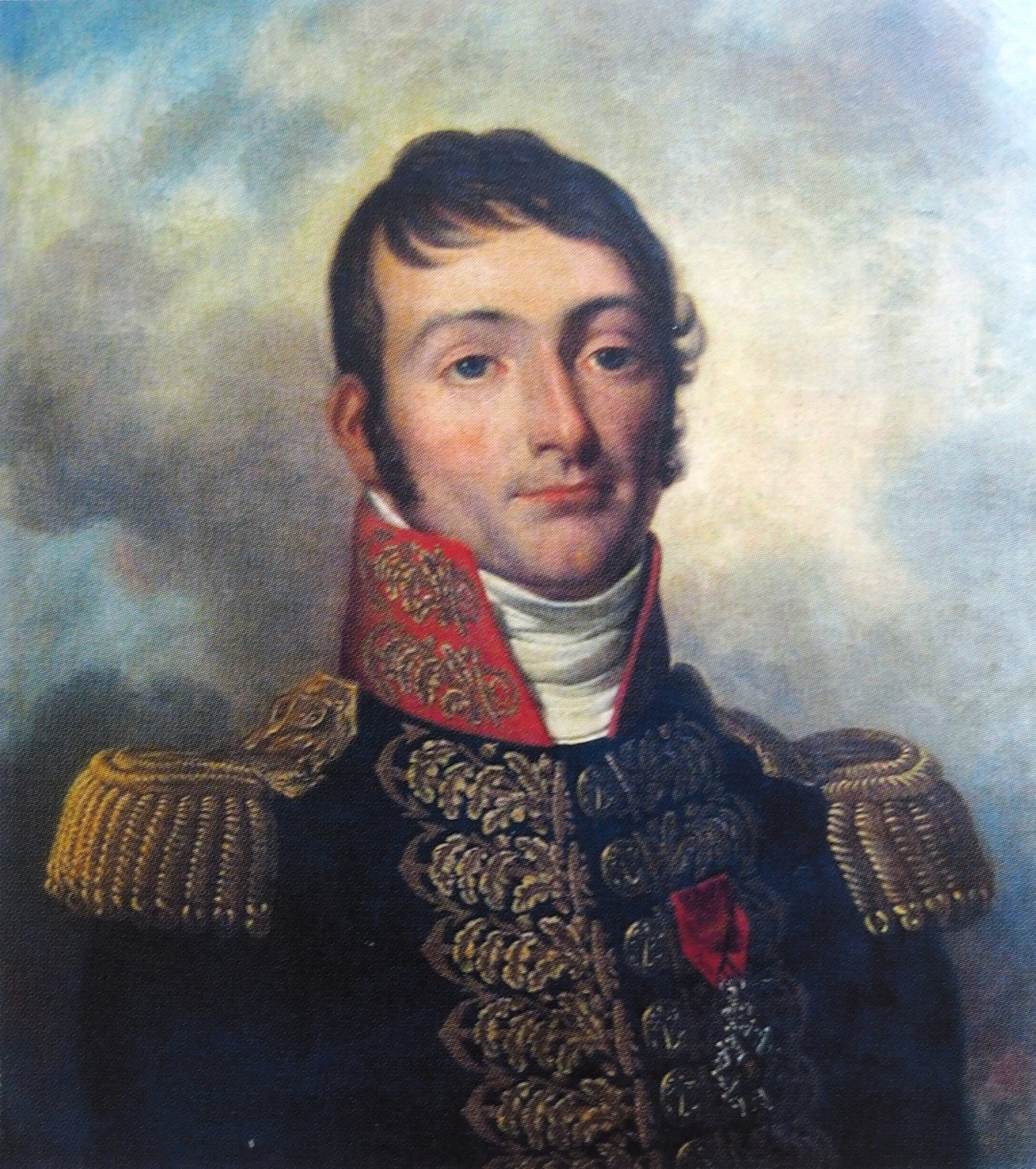
- Born: 28 December 1775; Saint-Benoît, Réunion
- Died: 18 June 1860 (aged 84); Saint-Servan
- Military career
- Allegiance: French First Republic; First French Empire
- Branch: French Navy; French Imperial Navy
- Rank: Ship-of-the-line captain
- Conflicts: French Revolutionary Wars; Napoleonic Wars; Battle of Vizagapatam; Action of 3 July 1810; Battle of Grand Port; Action of 13 September 1810; Action of 7 February 1813

Ship-of-the-line Captain Pierre-François-Henri-Étienne Bouvet de Maisonneuve (28 December 1775 – 18 June 1860) was a French Navy officer and privateer. Born to a Navy captain, Bouvet started sailing at the age of 11, He served under his father on various ships between France and the Indies. He was taken prisoner by the British during their occupation of Toulon in 1793.

Released, Bouvet served on the frigate Amazone in Linois's squadron, which raided commerce in the Indies. After Amazone was wrecked at Cape of Good Hope, he attempted to return to Isle de France and inform the governor, but was captured en route by a British frigate. Released on parole, Bouvet designed a patamar or felucca of Indian pattern that he named Entreprenant. After he was exchanged, he cruised off the Malabar Coast undetected amongst indigenous shipping. Appointed to a 16-gun brig also named Entreprenant, Bouvet sailed to Manila and rescued the crew of Mouche n° 6 from detention.

Embarked in Duperré's squadron, Bouvet was given command of the prize Minerve, on which he took part in a battle against three large East Indiamen, of which the squadron captured two. On their return to Isle de France, the squadron met four British frigates, which it defeated in the Battle of Grand Port. Duperré having been wounded, Bouvet commanded the French forces for the second half of the battle. Returned to France after the British invasion of Isle de France, Bouvet was given command of a two-frigate squadron, with his flag on Aréthuse. His other frigate was wrecked in a storm, and soon after, Aréthuse battled HMS Amelia in a bloody action that resulted in a stalemate. Bouvet never fought again, and devoted his late life to politics and writing.

== Career ==
=== Early life ===
Born to Pierre-Servais-René Bouvet, Pierre Bouvet enlisted in the French Navy as a volunteer at the age of 11, on 13 December 1786, (Note: Quintin (p.83) says 28 November 1775) and enlisted on the merchant fluyt Nécessaire, commanded by his father and bound for the Indies. He returned to France in May 1789. On 18 March 1791, he enlisted as a helmsman on the brig Goéland, returning in June. He then transferred on the 74-gun Tourville for a patrol the same month in June

In 1792, he became a midshipman, (Note: "aspirant entretenu" (Levot, p.58; Quintin p.83)) and served on the brand-new frigate Aréthuse in Toulon, under his father who had recently been promoted to captain. On Aréthuse, Bouvet took part in Truguet's raid on Sardinia from February to March 1793, before transferring on the 80-gun Languedoc on 3 April 1793.

On 1 July 1793, Bouvet was promoted to Ensign, and served on the 120-gun Commerce de Marseille. On 25 August, Royalist parties surrendered the harbour and arsenal of Toulon to the British and Spanish, along with all the ships anchored there. Bouvet was taken prisoner with his father, and expelled to Brest in September the Patriote, whose armament had been removed; Patriote reached Brest on 16 October. There, he was arrested on the spot by agents of the French Convention, transferred to Paris, and detained until 3 March 1795. (Note: Granier (p.341) says on 1 January 1795.)

=== Service in the English Channel ===
In June 1795, Bouvet was appointed to the frigate Rassurante, on which he roamed the English Channel until September. In November, he transferred on the corvette Foudroyante in Brest, on which he served until December. Then, he embarked on the frigate Bravoure, patrolling the English Channel until July 1796.

At the Thermidorian Reaction, the Convention reestablished the practice of Letters of marque and privateer commerce raiding. Bouvet obtained a release from Navy duty to enlist on a privateer, the Triton. She departed on 10 November 1797 and preyed on British merchantmen until 17 February 1798, when she was captured by the frigate HMS Melpomene. Bouvet was taken prisoner.

Released on 20 November 1798, Bouvet served in Brest harbour, before taking command of the 14-gun privateer Furet on 16 December 1799. On the 26th at 10:15, Furet was intercepted by HMS Viper under Lieutenant John Pengelly, After a running chase of over two hours, Viper caught up with Furet and delivered two broadsides that compelled her to strike her colours. Furet had four killed and six wounded, (Note: James (vol.2 p.373) states that the captain of Furet was killed, contradicting Quintin (p.84) who says that Bouvet was in command. Likewise, James names the captain of Furet as "Louis Bouvet".) including Bouvet, who suffered an injury and was again taken prisoner.

Released from captivity on 9 February 1800, (Note: Granier (p.342) states that Bouvet was not released until the Treaty of Amiens in 1802) Bouvet was appointed to the inspection of signals on the coasts near Brest; he held this position until 14 March 1801, when he was appointed to the frigate Consolante. He left Consolante in November 1801, and was appointed to Romaine in February 1802. In March, he transferred to the 74-gun Redoutable.

On 1 March, (Note: Granier (p.342) says 5 March.) Redoutable departed for Guadeloupe, attached to a division under Rear-Admiral Bouvet de Précourt. During the journey, on 24 April, Bouvet was promoted to Lieutenant. He left Redoutable on 20 August 1802.

=== Service on Amazone in Linois's squadron ===
On 17 February 1803, Bouvet was appointed to the frigate Atalante, under Captain Gaudin-Beauchêne, in the division of Rear-Admiral Linois sent to recover the French colonies of the Indies according to the terms of the Treaty of Amiens, under the overall command of General Decaen. The division, comprising four frigates and two fluyts, departed Brest on 6 March 1803, and arrived at Mauritius on 21 August. Upon arrival, it was informed of the outbreak of the War of the Third Coalition.

In the course of October, the division sailed to Batavia and Atalante detached to ferry the new commercial attaché, Jean-Baptiste Cavaignac, to Muscat, in Oman; she rejoined the division after the Battle of Pulo Aura. After a port call in Batavia. Belle Poule and Atalante detached and conducted independent commerce raiding cruises, while Linois returned to Mauritius; They notably captured the East Indiamen Athia, Princess Royal and Heroism.

On his return to Mauritius, Bouvet married his cousin Henriette Périer d'Hauterive on 1 June 1804, before departing on the 20th. With Linois' division, he cruised in the Gulf of Bengal, took part in the Battle of Vizagapatam on 15 September 1804, and returned to Mauritius in October with several prizes. Bouvet took part in another commerce raiding expedition between December 1804 and April 1805.

Governor Decaen having sent Linois back to France, the division departed in May 1805; while attempting to rejoining it, on 3 November 1805, Atalante was washed ashore by a gust of wind and wrecked near the Cape of Good Hope. Captain Gaudin-Beauchêne sent Bouvet to Mauritius with despatches for governor Decaen, and he embarked on the American brig Charles, but was taken prisoner by a British cruiser, HMS Pitt, and taken to Mumbai. Bouvent was released on parole on 15 September 1806, (Note: Granier (p.345) says in May 1806.) and sailed to La Réunion to visit his family.

=== Service on Entreprenant and the rescue of Mouche n° 6 ===
At Mauritius, Bouvet requested the construction of a patamar to which Decaen agreed. Formally exchanged in spring 1807, he named the ship Entreprenant on 30 November 1807, and on 7 December, he departed with a 40-man crew to cruise off the Western coast of India. With her unassuming indigenous appearance, Entreprenant sailed undetected amongst Indian patamars off the Malabar Coast; on 8 February, she captured the British mercantile brig Marguerite after a 3-hour battle. Bouvet then abandoned Entreprenant to his captives, and returned to Mauritius on his prize, which she renamed Entreprenant.

After this reconnaissance, Bouvet had a second Entreprenant constructed at Mauritius. She was a "brig gourable", (Note: A gourable (or grab (ship)) was an Indian-Ocean design, having a massive, high stern and a pointed, low bow, the widest point being at the beam, and being rigged similarly to a ketch.) of 16 guns, or 12 guns.

Bouvet departed for Ormuz on the new Entreprenant on 4 October 1808 to ferry despatches for General Gardane, ambassador in Theran. He then cruised off Malabar coast, where he captured nineteen prizes. On 30 November 1808, he battled the East indiamen Benares and the schooner Wasp, and made a number of other prizes. During a port call at the Maldives in February 1809, Bouvet had to repress a mutiny; he returned to Mauritius, on 16 March 1809, where the mutineers were shot.

On 24 May 1809, Decaen promoted him to acting Commander He was then tasked with a mission to Manila to investigate the fate of Mouche n° 6, under Lieutenant Ducrest de Villeneuve, disappeared there a few months before. On 28 August, Entreprenant reached Manila and learned that Borneo had sided for the Allies and interned the crew of Mouche n° 6. Furthermore, the 14-gun HMS Antelope was anchored at Cavite. Anchoring his ship off shore under a flag of truce, Bouvet sent a delegation to demand the release of the crew of Mouche n° 6, with orders to return to Entreprenant as soon as the message was delivered. However, the delegation had still not returned the next morning.

In order to obtain a clear casus belli, Bouvet anchored his ship at the entrance of Manila Bay, but stayed ready to set sail. Soon, Antelope and shore batteries opened up on Entreprenant, which promptly retreated. Bouvet sailed to Corregidor Island and endeavored to blockade all shipping bound for Manila. After collecting enough prisoners in this way, on 3 September, he released them on parole under promise not to navigate at sea before Mouche n° 6 would be released. Bouvet had them convey his ultimatum that if his conditions were not met the next day, he would attack the coasts of the island. The French crew detained in Manila was promptly released and returned to Entreprenant.

On her return journey, Entreprenant was chased by HMS Modeste, which she evaded, and anchored at Con Dao to repair her rigging. On 20 October, sailing through Malacca Strait, Entreprenant encountered a British convoy and detected an isolated sail, which she intercepted by 23:00. The ship was the 18-gun Ovidor, of the Dutch East India Company. She surrendered after the first broadside and was brought to Isle de France with a valuable cargo of Chinese goods, and 200,000 Piastres. Ovidor, a 550-tonne ship built in Portugal, was brought into French service as the fluyt Loire.

=== Service on Minerve, Duperré's squadron, and the Battle of Grand Port ===
Bouvet relinquished command of Entreprenant in late January 1810, was formally promoted to Commander on 1 February, and appointed to the frigate Minerve, after her capture on 22 November. On Minerve, he took part in the action of 3 July 1810, where he single-handedly engaged the East Indiamen Ceylon, Windham and Astell for one hour before the rest of Duperré's squadron rejoined him. The squadron then returned to Mauritius where it encountered four British frigates, leading to the Battle of Grand Port, from 20 to 27 August 1810.

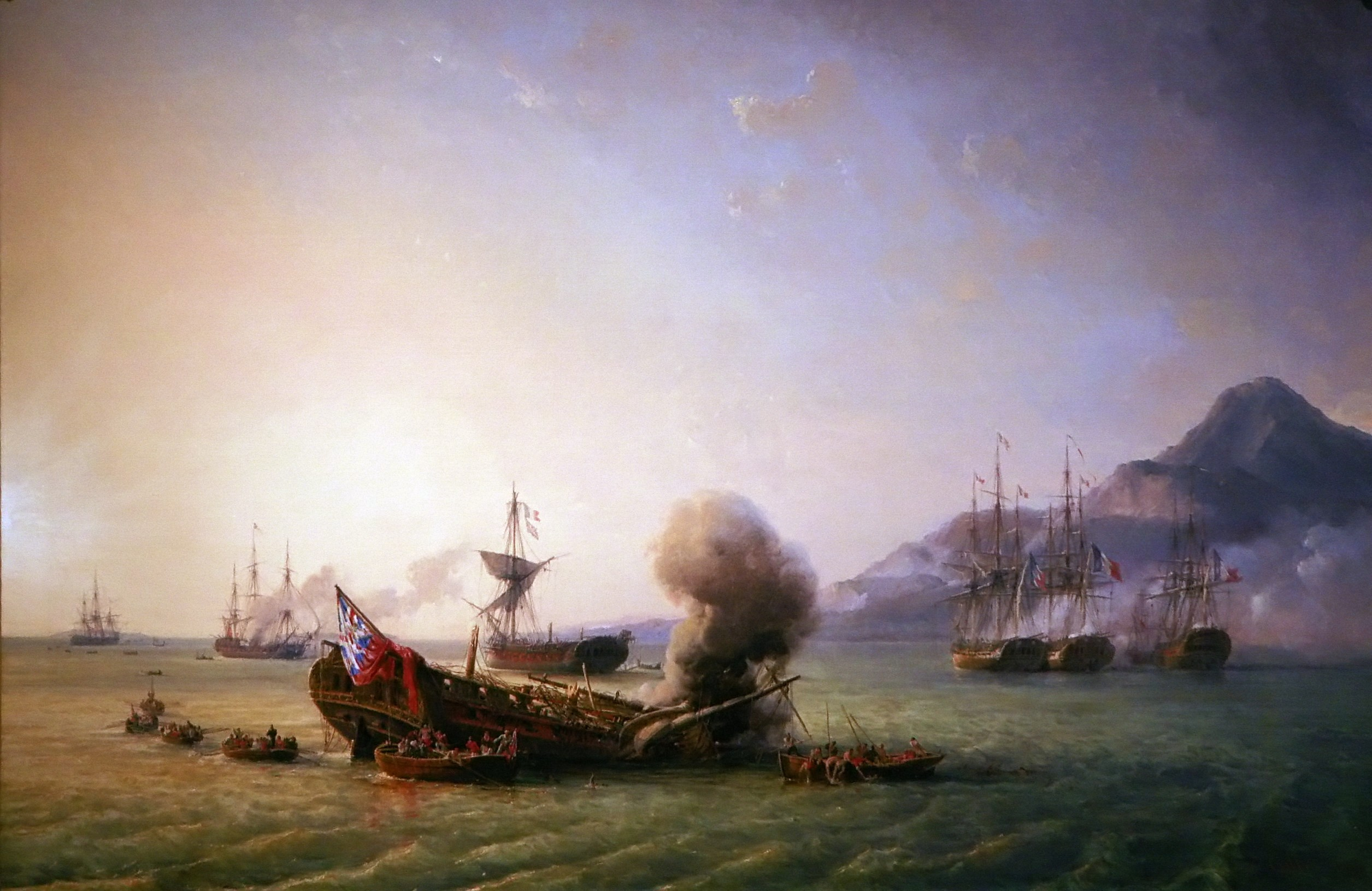
Combat de Grand Port by Pierre-Julien Gilbert. Bouvet commanded the French forces (on the right of the painting) during the second half of the battle.

At the Battle of Grand Port, Bouvet replaced Duperré as chief of the French squadron on Bellone when he was wounded and carried below deck. After the battle, on 3 September, Bouvet was promoted to acting Captain and appointed to the frigate Iphigénie, formerly HMS Iphigenia, one of the prizes surrendered during Battle of Grand Port.

=== Service on Iphigénie and the Fall of Mauritius ===
Since the Invasion of Île Bonaparte and consequent fall of La Réunion in early 9 July 1810, the British had planned the complete their conquest of the French possessions in the Indian Ocean by also invading Mauritius. In September, Iphigénie scrambled from Port-Nord-Ouest, along with Lemarant's Astrée, to intercept a British troop convoy. While in transit, they met HMS Africaine off Saint Denis; in the subsequent Action of 13 September 1810, Astrée and Iphigénie subdued Africaine, but had to abandon her when the rest of Rowley's frigate division arrived on the scene. Astrée and Iphigénie sailed to Mauritius for resupply and repair, captured the British East India Company's Bombay Marine's 14-gun sloop-of-war Aurora en route, and arrived at Port-Nord-Ouest on 22 September.

The Invasion of Isle de France eventually occurred on 29 November 1810, and Decaen surrendered to the British on 2 December. Under the terms of the capitulation, the French garrison was repatriated and on 11 April 1811, Bouvet embarked on the cartel Adèle, bound for France where he arrived on 14 August, landing in Morlaix.

=== Service on Aréthuse and battle with HMS Amelia ===
On 20 December 1810, Bouvet was formally promoted to captain, and was appointed Knight of the Legion of Honour. He planned an expedition to Batavia to carry out another campaign in the Indian Ocean, but his plans were rendered moot by the British Invasion of Java. After one year, on 6 December 1811, he was appointed to command the frigate Clorinde, on which he embarked on 5 January 1812. He relinquished this command on 7 October to transfer to the frigate Aréthuse and lead a frigate squadron also comprising Rubis, under Commander Louis-François Ollivier.

On 25 November 1812, Bouvet's division departed from Nantes, sailed to Cape Verde and Guinea, and anchored at Îles de Los; on its way, on 27 January, it destroyed HMS Daring and released her crew on parole. In the night of 4 February, a violent storm struck the island; Rubis broke her cables and was thrown aground on the shore of Tamara; deeming her impossible to refloat and recover, her crew scuttled her by fire the next day. Aréthuse suffered less, but still lost her rudder and required repairs.

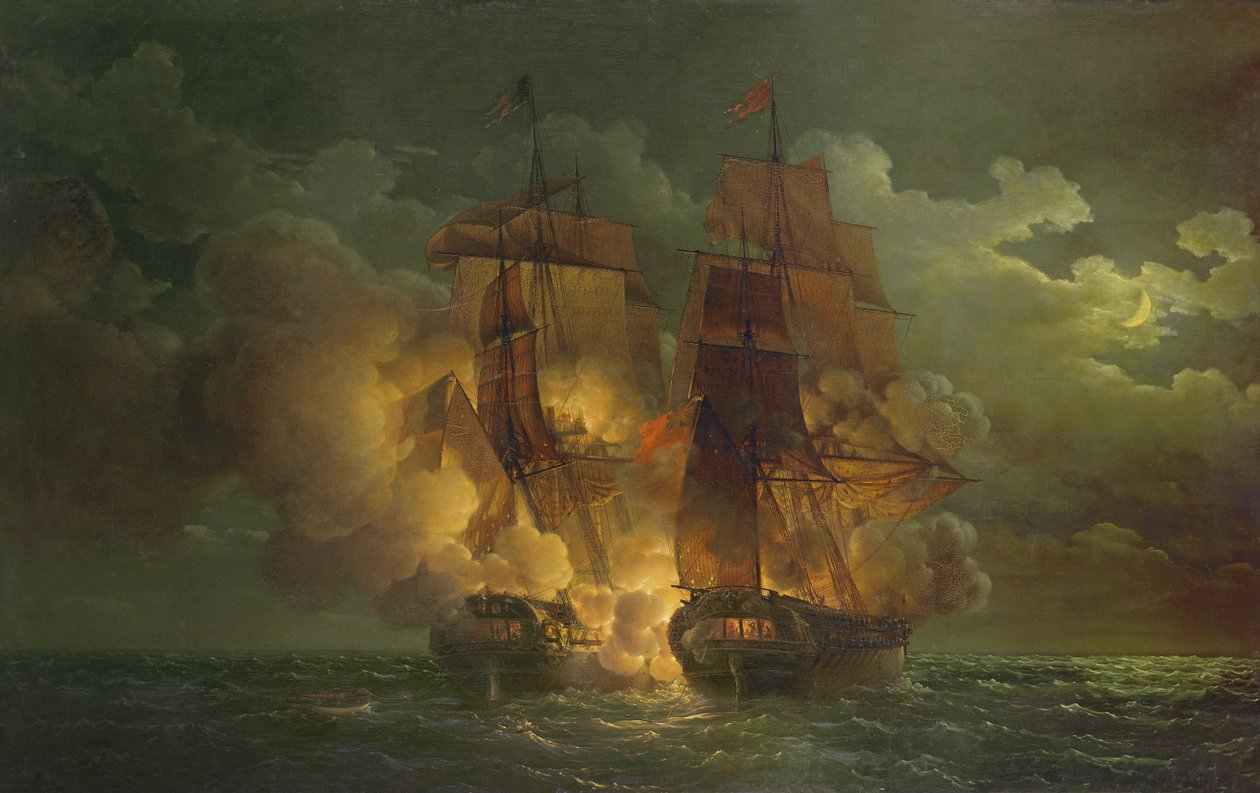
Painting of the action of 7 February 1813

On 7 February 1813, the frigate HMS Amelia, warned by the crew of Daring, arrived on the scene. A furious four-hour engagement ensued before the frigates parted, both with heavy casualties. Without delay, Amelia returned to England and Aréthuse to France, carrying the crew of Rubis. She arrived in Saint-Malo on 19 April 1813, having captured ten prizes during her campaign.

At Bouvet's return, Navy Minister Decrès criticised him for the loss of Rubis and near-loss of Aréthuse in the storm of February, while praising his conduct in the action of 7 February 1813 against Amelia and requesting that a painting be commissioned to commemorate the event. Probably because of these mixed reviews, Bouvet was appointed Officer of the Legion of Honour, on 2 July, but was neither promoted to Rear-Admiral, nor made a Baron of the Empire, as had been requested in his favour.

=== Later life ===
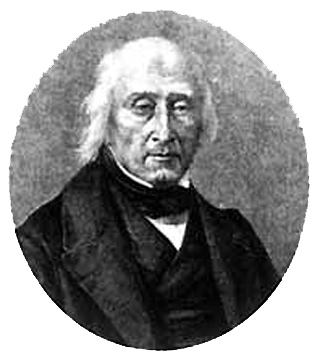

On 1 October 1813, Bouvet was relieved from duty due to ill health and replaced by Captain Le Bozec, and transferred the harbour service in Brest. It was not until after the Bourbon Restoration, on 21 June 1814, that he sailed again, at the command of the frigate Flore, and was sent for a mission in Antwerp to escort eleven transport ships to Brest, and to Senegal to ferry ammunitions. The new regime appointed him Knight of the Order of Saint Louis on 5 July 1814.

Bouvet relinquished command of Flore on 25 August 1815 and was given a leave of absence until 31 December, after which he was given no duty On 1 November 1817, he was finally ordered to Brest for harbour service, but started requesting his retirement to care for his ailing wife, who was almost blind. Promoted to Captain 1st class on 16 February 1820 and promoted Commander of the Legion of Honour on 5 July, he published his Observations sur la Marine in 1821; the year after, he finally obtained permission to retire from the Navy, and was granted the honorific rank of Rear-Admiral, effective on 30 October 1822.

On 30 July 1830, Bouvet's wife died, at the age of 45. After the July Revolution in 1830, Bouvet turned to politics and was elected on 28 October as Deputy for Ille-et-Vilaine at the Chamber of Deputies of the July Monarchy. On 26 April 1831, he was promoted Grand Officier of the Legion of Honour. Bouvet did not seek reelection and relinquished his office after the general elections of 5 July 1831. However, he continued to serve as conseiller général for Ille-et-Vilaine.

In 1833, Bouvet resigned as a member of the Council for Colonies for La Réunion, and in June, he married Marie-Thérèse Le Muey in Granville. He wrote a bitter account of his campaign, Précis des campagnes du capitaine de vaisseau Pierre Bouvet, which he published in 1840.

In 1852, Napoléon III reinstated Bouvet as titulary Rear-Admiral in the reserve corps. He also offered him a senatorship in 1858 during a visit to Saint-Servan and Saint-Malo, but Bouvet declined over his age, instead offering the services of his son, Colonel Pierre-Auguste Bouvet. He died in 1860 on June 18 Saint-Servan, and was buried in the Jeanne-Jugan Cemetery in Saint Malo. In 1864 when his son, father of Amélie Carette, died in Cherbourg, he was buried alongside him.

== Works ==
- Bouvet, Pierre (1821). Observations sur la Marine (in French). Paris: J.-G. Dentu.
- Bouvet, Pierre (1840). Précis des campagnes du capitaine de vaisseau Pierre Bouvet (in French). Paris: F. Didot.

== Honours ==
- Five ships were named after Bouvet. See French ship Bouvet for a list.
- Grand Officer of the Order of the Legion of Honour
- Knight of the Order of Saint Louis
- A statue was erected in front of the mairie of Saint-Servan

== Notes, citations, and references ==
=== References ===
- Jal, August (1848). Glossaire nautique:répertoire polyglotte de termes de marine anciens et modernes (in French). Firmin-Didot frères.
- Granier, Hubert (1998). Histoire des Marins français 1789–1815. illustrations by Alain Coz. Marines éditions. ISBN 2-909675-41-6.
- Levot, Prosper (1866). Les gloires maritimes de la France: notices biographiques sur les plus célèbres marins (in French). Bertrand.
- Quintin, Danielle; Quintin, Bernard (2003). Dictionnaire des capitaines de Vaisseau de Napoléon (in French). S.P.M. ISBN 2-901952-42-9.
- Troude, Onésime-Joachim (1867). Batailles navales de la France (in French). Vol. 3. Challamel ainé.
- Troude, Onésime-Joachim (1867). Batailles navales de la France (in French). Vol. 4. Challamel ainé.
- Roche, Jean-Michel (2005). Dictionnaire des bâtiments de la flotte de guerre française de Colbert à nos jours. Vol. 1. Group Retozel-Maury Millau. ISBN 978-2-9525917-0-6. OCLC 165892922.
- Fonds Marine. Campagnes (opérations; divisions et stations navales; missions diverses). Inventaire de la sous-série Marine BB4. Tome deuxième : BB4 1 à 482 (1790–1826)
