= HMS Jackal (1801) =

Bloodhound-class brig of the Royal Navy

History

United Kingdom
- Name: HMS Jackall
- Ordered: 7 January 1801
- Builder: Perry, Wells and Green, Blackwall
- Laid down: January 1801
- Launched: 1 April 1801
- Fate: Wrecked 29 May 1807

General characteristics
- Class & type: Bloodhound-class gun-brig
- Tons burthen: 18560/94 (bm)
- Length: 80 ft 0 in (24.4 m) (overall); 65 ft 6 in (20.0 m) (keel)
- Beam: 238 ft 1 in (72.6 m)
- Depth of hold: 8 ft 6 in (2.6 m)
- Propulsion: Sails
- Sail plan: Brig
- Complement: 50
- Armament: 10 × 18-pounder carronades + 2 × 18 or 32-pounder carronades as bow chasers

HMS Jackal (or Jackall) was a Bloodhound-class brig of the Royal Navy, launched in 1801. She captured a number of small prizes in the Channel, including one armed sloop, before she was lost in 1807.

== Service ==
Jackal was built to a design by Sir John Henslow. The Royal Navy commissioned her in April 1801 under the command of Lieutenant George Pattison, for the Nore. In 1802 Lieutenant William Hicks replaced Pattinson. An investigation by the Victualling Commissioners resulted in a court martial dismissing Hicks from the Navy for what was a kick-back scheme. Further investigation implicated the commanders of six more vessels in accepting over-charging by suppliers at Margate.

Lieutenant Charles Tovey Leaver recommissioned Jackal in April 1803.

On the afternoon of 29 September 1803, Jackall sighted and chased a sloop running along the shore between Nieuport and Dunkirk. The wind fell so Leaver sent 11 men in a boat to board the quarry. As the British approached, the sloop ran ashore near three field pieces and a small battery of two guns, and her crew of 10 or 12 men escaped on shore. Jackall, which had been using her sweeps, and with the assistance of a light breeze that had arisen, came up and provided support for the boat and the sloop, which the boarding party had gotten off. The sloop turned out to be from Dunkirk, armed with four 2-pounder guns, and possibly serving to transport troops. Despite the fire from the sloop before she grounded, and the guns on shore, which were within 25 yards of the sloop, the British sustained no casualties. The sloop turned out to be San Façon.

In June 1804 Jackall detained and sent into Dover Vrow Elina, of Emden, which was sailing from Dort to France.

In 1804 Lieutenant Charles Stewart replaced Leaver. Stewart was captain on 14 June when Jackall intercepted three luggers off Kent. She was able to capture two, Io, of Deal, and Nancy, both of which turned out to be smuggling brandy and gin from Guernsey. Stewart sent them into Dover.

Jackall came into Deal with the loss of her fore top-mast on 23 September.

Still, in October, Jackal detained and sent into Dover Juno, Schels, master, which had been carrying wheat from Amsterdam to Cadiz.

On 10 January 1805 Jackal sailed from Deal with a pilot, Mr Kercaldie, on board to replace the floating light on the Galloper Sand. This had broken loose from its moorings in the December gales that swept it through the Downs on 18 December when a Deal boat put two men on board and took it in to Dover.

Jackall was in company with Blazer and Furious on 20 April and so shared in the capture on that day of Dorothea.

In mid-August Vrow von Scholten, Fitzpatrick, master, came into the Downs after Jackall detained her. Vrow von Scholten had been sailing from St Thomas's to Amsterdam.

On 10 February 1806 Jackall recaptured Pomona, John Lemon, master. Pomona had been sailing from St Kitt's to London when a Dutch privateer had captured her. Jackall sent Pomona into the Downs.

Then on 12 April Jackall arrived in the Downs with two vessels she had detained.

The next day Jackall captured Printz Henrick, Krohn, master. At the end of the month, on 30 April, Jackall captured Mentor, Lutjberg, master. Mentor, of and for Uddevalla, had been sailing from Rochelle.

On 25 June, Amelia, Escort, Jackall, and Minx captured sundry Dutch fishing boats. (Note: A seaman's share of the prize money was worth 6s 0 3/4d.)

In February 1807, Jackall towed Thames, Maule, master, on a voyage from London to Jamaica, into Ramsgate after Thames ran into difficulties off Fecamp. Maule reported that he had seen the French carry into Dieppe a large ship that had been dismasted. Stewart reported that there were a number of dismasted ships near the coast and that many may have been driven on shore. Furthermore, he had seen a number of men of war dismasted and anchored near the French coast.

Jackall, Furious, Mariner, and Minx shared in the proceeds of the capture on 13 April of Twee Gebroeders, Moller, master. Lloyd's List reported the vessel as Twee Gesusters, and that she had been sailing from Normande to Norway when Lynx and Jackall had detained her and sent her into the Downs.

== Fate ==
On 29 May 1807 Jackal was in the North Sea when she sighted and gave pursuit to a French privateer lugger, which eventually escaped into Dunkirk. As the weather worsened in the evening Jackal attempted to head back to the Downs, but grounded in the night. The crew manned the pumps until dawn, when they discovered that they were on the French shore, about three miles from Calais. As the tide rose, Jackal sank around 5 a.m., at which point the crew took to the rigging. By 8 a.m. the tide had gone out sufficiently that all were able safely to go ashore, whereupon the French took them prisoner.

The court martial for the loss of Jackal did not take place until 16 June 1814, presumably after her officers and crew returned from captivity.
