= Sorcière (privateer) =

Sorcière (French for witch, that is, a practitioner of witchcraft) was the name of several privateers that sailed during the Napoleonic Wars. Three were French vessels, but one was British, though the British Sorciere was probably the Sorcière launched in 1803 at Saint-Malo that the British Royal Navy captured in April 1806.

== Sorcière (French privateers) ==
- Sorcière was a felucca-rigged French privateer that HMS Medusa encountered on 6 December 1803 in the Strait of Gibraltar and pursued until Sorcière ran aground and was wrecked near Cabrita Point, nine miles south-west of Marbella. Sorcière had been armed with two 12-pounder and two 6-pounder guns, and had had a crew of 70 men.
- Sorcière was a French privateer lugger of 45 tons (French; "of load") operating out of Saint-Malo. She reportedly looked much like a fishing boat. She was originally armed with ten 4-pounder guns and carried a crew of 42 men. She was commissioned in September 1803. HMS Rebuff captured Sorcière on 26 April 1806. Rebuff encountered Sorcière about seven leagues from Guernsey and gave chase. Mayflower, a British privateer, joined the chase and after a total of nine hours of pursuit, Sorcière surrendered to her. Sorcière was four days out of Saint-Malo and had made no captures. She was armed with 16 guns and had a crew of 46 men. At the time of her capture Admiral James Saumarez remarked "[She] has...done immense Injury to our Trade, particularly off the Coast of Ireland, and in the Bristol Channel." Between September 1803 and her capture she had the same owners, La Même and Gaultier, served under three successive captains, and had captured numerous British merchant vessels.
  - September 1803 to November 1803: Captain Jacques Laurent.
  - November 1803 to November 1804: Captain Pierre Dupont. In December Sorcière captured Cleopatra, of Guernsey, which carrying a cargo of codfish, and took her into Saint-Malo.
  - November 1804 to April 1806: Captain Jacques DeBon. On 10 December 1804 Sorcière sent into Le Conquet an English ship of 150 tons carrying butter and provisions. By mid-February 1805 Sorcière and General Perignon had made a number of captures: Rover, of Jersey; Nancy (8 guns), from Lisbon; Victor, of Poole, from Newfoundland; Ark, of Poole, from Newfoundland; and Peggy, of 150 tons, carrying iron for London. They also burned three vessels: brig Temple, from Swansea; Hebe, from Guernsey, from Dublin; and Nancy, of Irvine. Sorcière captured the Spanish ship Carina, from Montevideo, which a British frigate had captured, and sent her into Minden, where she arrived on 21 February. Around 21 November Sorcière captured two vessels, one of them the brig Assistance, which had been carrying sugar and coffee, and sent them into Saint-Malo. Assistance was also carrying rum, elephant teeth, cheese, butter, etc. The other vessel was carrying coals and 200 bales of wool. On 6 November Sorcière captured Devonshire, Pike, master, which had been sailing from Liverpoole to Teignmouth.
- Sorcière was a French privateer lugger of 14 guns (10 thrown overboard during the chase), and 60 men, under the command of Guillaume Françoise Neele (or Néel), operating out of Saint-Malo, that HMS Attack captured on 28 January 1806. She and her consort Voltiguer had been out two days but had taken nothing before Attack and HMS Growler captured them. Sorcière had been launched in 1805 and commissioned in December.

== Sorciere (British privateer) ==
- Sorciere was a lugger of 57 tons (bm) and four guns (of varying sizes). She was probably the Sorcière that the Royal Navy captured in April 1806.
  - 1st Letter of Marque. Thomas John Brehaut? received the first letter of marque for Sorciere on 28 April 1807. She was armed with four 6&12-pounder guns and had a crew of 25 men.
  - 2nd Letter of Marque. Thomas Gilbert received the second letter of marque on 12 May 1809. At that time she was armed with four 12-pounder guns and had a crew of 30 men. HMS Amelia and Sorciere recaptured Wanstead on 3 April 1810. Sorciere sued for a share of the salvage money. The evidence was fragmentary, but Judge Sir William Scott ruled that as Amelia acknowledged that Sorciere had joined the chase, Sorciere was entitled to one-sixth of the salvage money. After her recapture, Wanstead was taken into Plymouth.
  - 3rd Letter of Marque. On 20 May 1812 a letter of marque was issued to Peter (or Pierre) Touzeau, apparently a Guernseyman. Sorciere was armed with four 2-pounder guns and had a crew of 15 men.
