= Wanstead (ship) =

At least three ships have borne the name Wanstead, named for the town of Wanstead:

- Wanstead (1802 ship) was launched in 1802. In 1807 and 1810 French privateers captured her, but both times the British Royal Navy recaptured her. She made one voyage to Bengal under a licence from the British East India Company. She was wrecked in 1820 at Grenada.
- Wanstead (1813 ship) - a ship launched in North America in 1811 that the British captured in 1813. Between 1813 and 1814 she made one voyage to Australia transporting convicts. She was wrecked in 1816 off Brazil.
- Wanstead (1826 ship) - was launched in 1826 at St John, New Brunswick. From 1826 on she sailed from England, first as a West Indiaman. She made two voyages transporting passengers to Tasmania, one voyage in 1827–28, and the other in 1829–30, stopping for the Swan River Colony. Between 1831 and 1837 she made one voyage as a whaler, catching whales off Japan, and then off New Zealand. She then returned to trading with the West Indies. Her crew abandoned her at sea in September 1843.
