= French frigate Rubis =

Pallas-class frigate of the French Navy

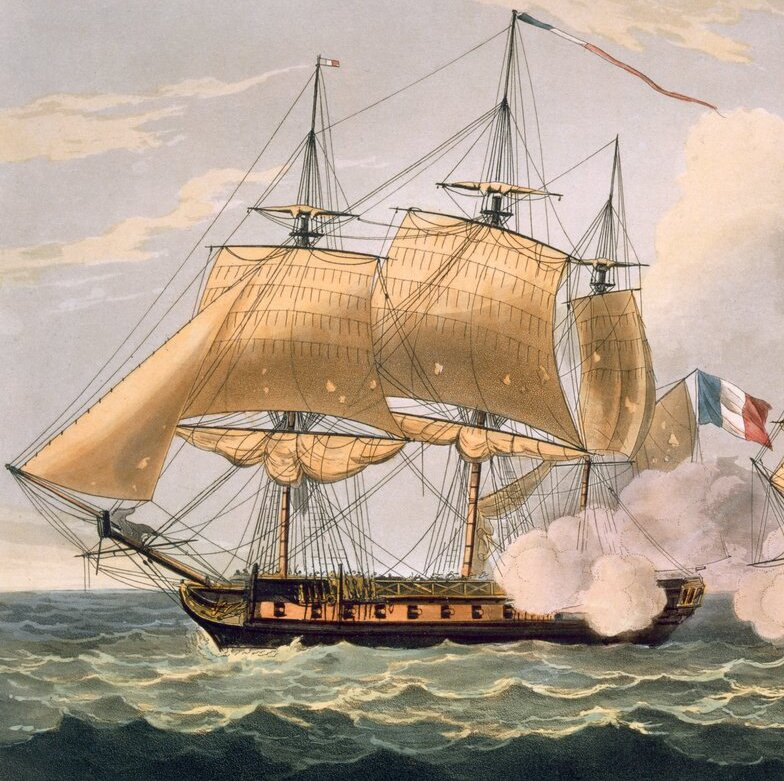
- Clorinde, a sister ship of Rubis

History

France
- Name: Rubis
- Namesake: Ruby
- Ordered: 21 October 1809
- Builder: Antoine Crucy, Basse-Indre, nr Nantes
- Laid down: June 1810
- Launched: 25 May 1812
- Commissioned: 7 August 1812
- Fate: Burnt 5 February 1813

General characteristics
- Class & type: Pallas-class frigate
- Displacement: 1,080 tonnes
- Length: 46.93 m (154 ft 0 in)
- Beam: 11.91 m (39 ft 1 in)
- Draught: 5.9 m (19 ft 4 in)
- Propulsion: 1,950 m^{2} (21,000 sq ft) of sail
- Complement: 326
- Armament: Nominally 40 guns; In practice carried either 44 or 46 guns: Battery: 28 18-pounders; Quarterdeck & forecastle: 8 × 8-pounder long guns; 8 × 36-pounder carronades or 12 × 18-pounder carronades

Rubis was a 40-gun Pallas-class frigate of the French Navy. On 25 November 1812, under Commander Louis-François Ollivier, Rubis sailed from Nantes along with Aréthuse (Captain Pierre Bouvet) to intercept British trade off West Africa. In January, having captured a Portuguese ship, La Serra, they reached Cap-Vert. On 27 January 1813, Aréthuse intercepted the brig HMS Daring (Lieutenant Pascoe) off Tamara. Released prisoners reported the presence of the French frigates, prompting the departure of HMS Amelia (Captain Frederick Paul Irby).

On the night of 5 February, a storm hit Rubis and Aréthuse while at anchor; both frigates broke their cables and Rubis was thrown ashore, while Aréthuse managed to sail clear of the coast into open water. Efforts to refloat her the next day proved futile, and she was abandoned by her crew, who embarked on the prize Serra and scuttled her by fire. Aréthuse fought the action of 7 February 1813 with HMS Amelia the next day, and after the stalemate with her opponent, returned on the site of the wreck to repatriate the crew to France.
