= Arline Généreux =

Canadian artist

- Born: 1897; Quebec City, Quebec
- Died: 1987; Montreal, Quebec

Arline Généreux (1897 – 1987) was a Canadian artist.

Her work is included in the collections of the Musée national des beaux-arts du Québec and the National Gallery of Canada.
