= Wanstead (1802 ship) =

History

United Kingdom
- Name: Wanstead
- Namesake: Wanstead
- Owner: G. Miller and Co.; Pycroft & Co.; Rains & Co.; Miller & Co.
- Builder: Richard Chapman, Bideford
- Launched: 6 February 1802
- Fate: Wrecked 11 July 1820

General characteristics
- Tons burthen: 399, 39910/94, or 400 (bm)
- Propulsion: Sail
- Complement: 1805:25; 1808:40
- Armament: 1805:10 × 12&4-pounder guns; 1807:10 × 12-pounder carronades; 1808:20 × 6&12-pounder guns

Wanstead was launched in 1802. In 1807 a French privateer captured her, but the British Royal Navy recaptured her the next day. Then in 1810 she was again captured by a French privateer, and was again recaptured a few days later. In 1819 she traded with India or China under a license from the British East India Company (EIC). She was wrecked in 1820.

== Career ==
Thomas Wilson received a letter of marque for Wanstead on 1 October 1805. In 1807 her trade was London-Madeira.

On 25 April 1807 Wanstead, Wilson, master, was sailing from London and Madeira to Barbados and Jamaica. She encountered the French privateer Lady Villaret, of six guns and 117 men. In the 4-hour single-ship action that ensued, Wanstead had one man killed and five wounded before she struck. Lady Villaret had 15 men killed and wounded. The next day Admiral Alexander Cochrane's squadron recaptured Wanstead and took her into Barbados. (Note: On 15 August 1807, HMS Blonde, Captain Volant Vashon Ballard, captured Dame Villaret after a chase of 13 hours. She was armed with an 18-pounder gun and four 9-pounder carronades, and had a crew of 69 men. She had been out twenty days but had taken no prizes. French sources refer to the privateer as Villaret, but otherwise the description and her capture by Blonde match.)

William Coultons received a letter of marque on 14 April 1808.

On 26 March 1810 Wanstead, Morton, master, was sailing from Jamaica to London when the French privateer Grand Decidé, of 18 guns and 200 men, captured her. (Note: Grand Décidé was a three-masted ship from Bordeaux, launched in August 1809 by the Courau brothers and commissioned as Décidé in September 1809 under Louis Briolle. She was 30.05 metres long, of 277 tons (French; "of load"), and had a crew of 12 officers and 128 men. She carried two 6-pounder guns and twelve 24-pounder carronades. On 9 December 1809 she underwent a mutiny on board. This led to the arrest of 17 men and the eventual execution of two of them. Her owners renamed her Grand Décidé in 1810.) HMS Amelia and the British privateer Sorcière recaptured Wanstead on 3 April 1810.

Sorciere sued for a share of the salvage money. The evidence was fragmentary, but Judge Sir William Scott ruled that as Amelia acknowledged that Sorciere had joined the chase, Sorciere was entitled to one-sixth of the salvage money. After her recapture, Wanstead was taken into Plymouth.

In 1818, Wanstead, W. Young, master, was shown with trade London-India. She sailed to Bengal on 20 January. On 28 October 1818 Wanstead, Young, master, was in Madras Roads when a gale drove her and a number of other vessels out.

The entry in Lloyd's Register for 1819 saw her master changing to Richards, and her trade changing to London-St Vincent.

== Fate ==
Wanstead, Smith, master, was wrecked on 11 July 1820 at Irvin's Bay, Grenada, after her cables parted during a storm. Her crew and part of her cargo were saved.
