= HMS Amelia (1796) =

18th-century frigate of the British Royal Navy

- HMS Amelia Chasing the French Frigate Aréthuse; John Christian Schetky, 1852

History

France
- Name: Proserpine
- Builder: Brest, France
- Laid down: December 1784
- Launched: 25 June 1785
- Commissioned: August 1785
- Fate: Captured by the Royal Navy on 13 June 1796

Great Britain
- Acquired: 13 June 1796 by capture
- Commissioned: August 1797
- Renamed: Renamed HMS Amelia on capture
- Honors and awards: Naval General Service Medal with clasps: "12th October 1798"; "29 Aug. Boat Service 1800"
- Fate: Broken up in December 1816

General characteristics
- Class & type: Hébé-class frigate
- Displacement: 1,350 tonneaux
- Tons burthen: 700 port tonneaux; 1,05935/94 (bm)
- Length: 151 ft 4 in (46.1 m) (overall); 126 ft 1 3/8 in (38.4 m)
- Beam: 39 ft 8 7/8 in (12.1 m)
- Depth of hold: 12 ft 6 1/2 in (3.8 m)
- Sail plan: Full-rigged ship
- Complement: French service: 325; British service:284 (later 315)
- Armament: In French Navy service: 1785–93: 26 × 18-pounder guns + 8 × 8-pounder guns; 1793–96: 26 × 18-pounder guns + 12 × 9-pounder guns + 4 × 36-pounder howitzers or 32-pounder carronades (when captured); In Royal Navy service: Upper deck: 28 × 18-pounder guns; QD: 8 × 9-pounder guns + 4 × 24-pounder carronades; Fc: 9-pounder guns + 2 × 24-pounder carronades (By 1810 the guns had been removed from the quarterdeck and only two 9-pounders remained on the forecastle.)

Proserpine was a 38-gun Hébé-class frigate of the French Navy launched in 1785 that HMS Dryad captured on 13 June 1796. The Admiralty commissioned Proserpine into the Royal Navy as the fifth rate, HMS Amelia. She spent 20 years in the Royal Navy, participating in numerous actions in the French Revolutionary and Napoleonic Wars, capturing a number of prizes, and serving on anti-smuggling and anti-slavery patrols. Her most notable action was her intense and bloody, but inconclusive, fight in 1813 with the French frigate Aréthuse. Amelia was broken up in December 1816.

== Construction ==
Proserpine was a Hébé-class frigate built for the French Navy of the Ancien Régime in Brest. Jacques-Noël Sané designed her as well as five sister ships and she was rated for thirty-eight guns.

== French naval service (1785–1796) ==
Proserpine was stationed at Saint Domingue from 1786 until 1788. In 1792, she was under Ensign Van Stabel. From 1793, she served as a commerce raider under Captain Jean-Baptiste Perrée, notably capturing the 32-gun Dutch frigate Vigilante and several merchantmen of a convoy that Vigilante was escorting.

On 23 June 1795, under Captain Daugier, Proserpine took part in the Battle of Groix as the flagship of Admiral Villaret de Joyeuse. She unsuccessfully attempted to regroup the French fleet, almost colliding with the Droits de l'Homme in the process. Proserpine then fired a broadside at the approaching British fleet before she escaped.

Almost a year later, on 13 June 1796, about 12 leagues (58 km) south of Cape Clear, Ireland, the frigate HMS Dryad, under the command of Captain Lord Amelius Beauclerk, captured Proserpine following a relatively brief chase but a bitter action. In the engagement, Proserpine, under the command of Citizen Pevrieu, lost 30 men killed and 45 wounded out of her crew of 348 men. Dryad had two men killed and seven wounded. In 1847 the Admiralty awarded the Naval General Service Medal with clasp "Dryad 13 June 1796" to all surviving claimants from the action.

As the Royal Navy already had a Proserpine (1777), the Admiralty renamed the captured vessel HMS Amelia after Princess Amelia, the youngest daughter of George III. The Royal Navy classified her as a fifth rate of a nominal thirty-eight guns. The deck and sheer and profile plans made following survey at Plymouth in 1797 are now in the National Maritime Museum.

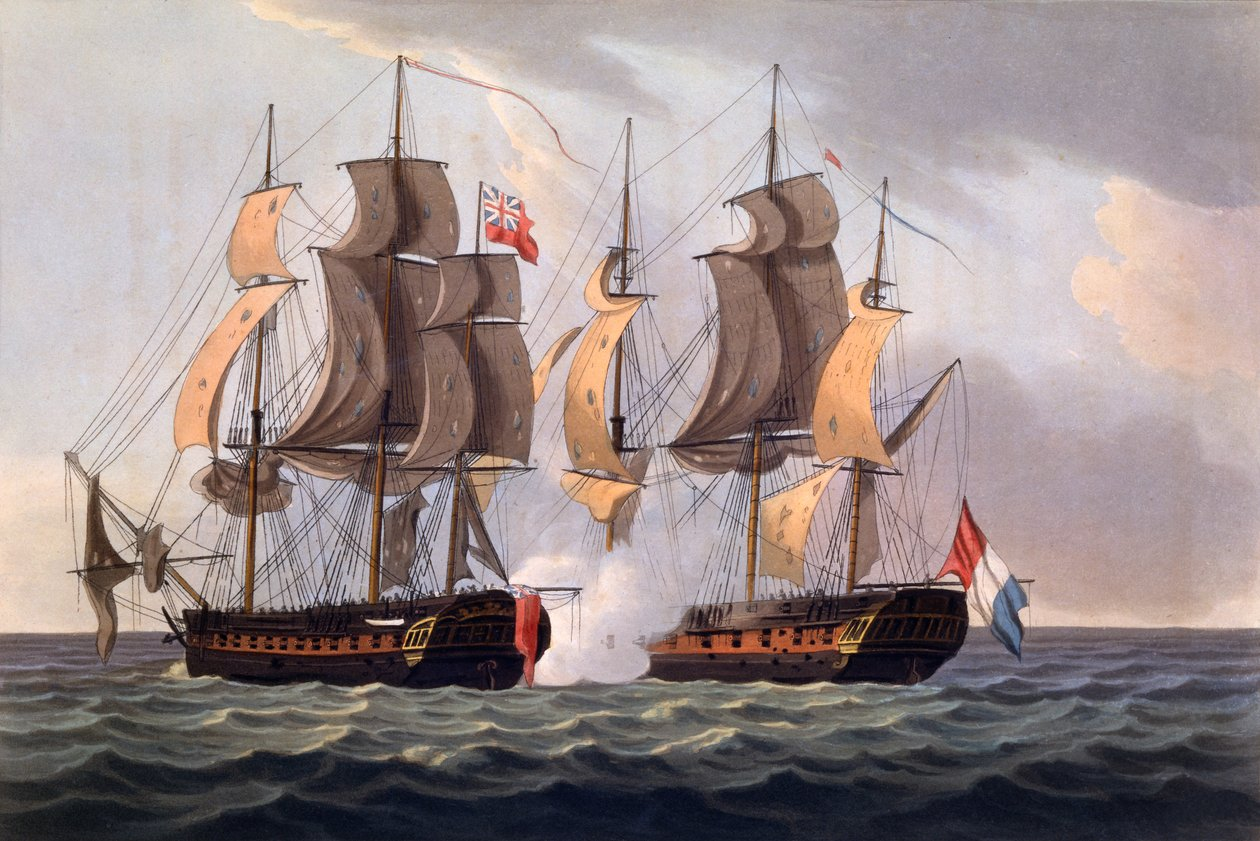
HMS Dryad vs Proserpine

== British service ==
Captain Charles Herbert commissioned Amelia in August 1797 for service in the Channel.

=== Battle of Tory Island (1798) ===
She joined Ethalion and Sylph on 18 September 1798 blockading the French Brest Squadron, preventing them sailing for Ireland to support the Irish Rebellion with troops. During the night of 11 – 12 October Commodore, Sir John Borlase Warren made the signal for a general chase. Commodore Warren's squadron engaged the French squadron, and captured the Hoche (74 guns) and the frigates Embuscade, Coquille and Bellone. In doing so, the British also captured Wolfe Tone, the leader of the United Irishmen. In 1847 the Admiralty awarded the surviving claimants from the battle the Naval General Service Medal with clasp "12th October 1798".

=== Channel blockade (1798–1802) ===
On 31 January 1799, while at anchor in the Hamoaze, Formidable broke free from her moorings and struck the Amelia. Fortunately both ships had struck their topmasts and damage was light. Amelia was able to sail on 4 February.

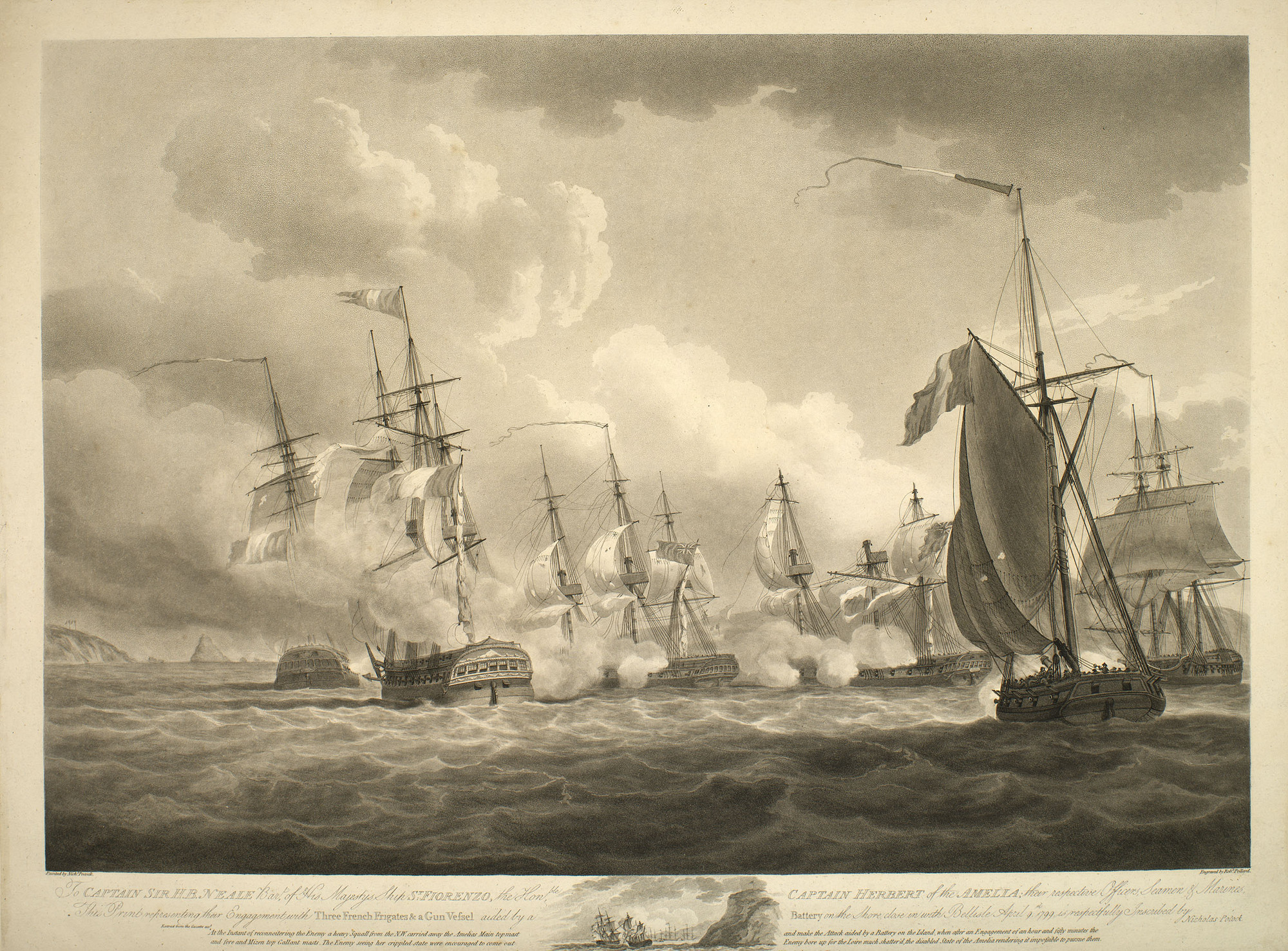
St Fiorenzo and Amelia, close in on three French frigates and a gun vessel off Belle-Île, 9 April 1799

On 9 April, after reconnoitring two French frigates in Lorient, HMS St Fiorenzo and Amelia sailed towards Belle Île in very hazy weather. Here three French frigates and a large gun vessel hiding against the coast surprised them. At that instant a sudden squall carried away Amelia's main-top-mast and fore and mizzen top-gallant masts; the fall of the former tore much of the mainsail from the yard. Captain Neale of San Fiorenzo shortened sail and ordered Amelia to bear up with him to maintain the weather gage and prepare for battle. The enemy showed no inclination for close-quarter action, and although the British ships came under fire from shore batteries, they had to bear down on the French three times to engage them. After nearly two hours the French wore ship and stood away to take refuge in the river Loire. From a captured French ship they learned later that the French frigates were Vengeance, Sémillante, and Cornélie. Amelia lost 2 killed and 17 wounded.

On 29 August 1800, in Vigo Bay, Admiral Sir Samuel Hood assembled a cutting-out party from the vessels under his command consisting of two boats each from Amelia, Stag, Amethyst, Brilliant and Cynthia, four boats from Courageaux, as well as the boats from Renown, London and Impetueux The party went in and after a 15-minute fight captured the French privateer Guêpe, of Bordeaux and towed her out. She was of 300 tons burthen and had a flush deck. Pierced for 20 guns, she carried eighteen 9-pounders, and she and her crew of 161 men were under the command of Citizen Dupan. In the attack she lost 25 men killed, including Dupan, and 40 wounded. British casualties amounted to four killed, 23 wounded and one missing. (Note: A first-class share of the prize money was worth £42 19s 6 1/2d; a fifth-class share, that of a seaman, was worth 1s 9 1/2d.) In 1847 the Admiralty awarded the Naval General Service Medal with clasp "29 Aug. Boat Service 1800" to all surviving claimants from the action.

During a dark and stormy night on 5 February 1801 Amelia captured the French privateer brig Juste of St Malo. It was so dark that the two vessels did not see each other until the brig ran into the Amelia, which cost the brig her foremast and bowsprit. Juste, with 14 guns and 78 men under the command of Jean Pierre Charlet, had been out from Lorient for 30 days without making a capture. A prize crew brought Juste into Plymouth on 10 February, and Amelia returned on 21 February.

On 10 May Amelia had just anchored close to the mouth of the Loire when she saw a brig sailing into the river. As soon as the privateer spotted Amelia she tacked with all sail. As evening was approaching, Captain Charles Herbert immediately set off in pursuit, capturing the brig after a chase of four hours. She was the privateer Heureux of Saint Malo, with 14 guns and 78 men. She had been cruising for 41 days but had made no captures. She was uncoppered due to the shortage of that material and this possibly resulted in her being slower than she otherwise might have been. Amelia sent Heureux into Plymouth, where she arrived on 17 May.

On 23 June Amelia took bullocks out to the Channel Fleet. This was a common occurrence, with the Victualing Office using warships returning to the blockade to deliver meat on the hoof.

At the end of June, Amelia sailed to Rochefort to reconnoitre the enemy. Medusa (50 guns), together with an unidentified 44-gun ship and an armed schooner, came out to oppose her. A smart action ensued in full view of the spectators lining the cliffs. Although the Embuscade (32 guns) sailed out to assist them, the enemy retired under the protection of the shore batteries after an hour. Captain Herbert lay to, but they declined to come out again, so he sailed to join Sir Edward Pellew.

Next, on 4 August, a Spanish packet came into Plymouth. Amelia had captured the packet as she was on her way from Havana to Ferrol with a cargo of sugar, coffee and hides. The packet was armed with six guns and had a crew of 40 men.

On 8 August the hired armed cutter Hirondelle captured two French brigs. Amelia shared in the prize money.

In September Amelia captured a number of coasters and brigs in the Bay of Biscay. One of them, the brig Cheodore, laden with sardines, arrived in Plymouth on 27 September, together with another brig in ballast. Shortly after, a seaman from Amelia died in the Royal Naval Hospital after being wounded by a loaded musket that went off as the armourer was cleaning it. At the inquest, on 19 October, Mr Whitford, the coroner for Devon recorded a verdict of accidental death. Two more men were wounded but recovered and a third man, who was killed on the spot, was buried at sea.

=== Anti-smuggling service and the Peace of Amiens (1802–1803) ===
On 6 January 1802 Amelia was ordered to be victualed for 4 months, and 21 days later she sailed on a cruise against smugglers. During the night of 1 March some words passed between the boat's crew of Amelia and some Portuguese seamen at the Pier Head, Barbican, Plymouth. A violent scuffle ensued that developed into a battle; during the conflict one of the Portuguese drew a long knife and stabbed one of Amelia's men in the groin. He bled profusely but a surgeon managed to stop the flow. The Portuguese fled but were rounded up the following morning.

In April 1802 Captain Lord Proby took command. On 6 May Amelia sailed from Plymouth for Cork, Waterford and Dublin with 150 discharged seamen, returning on 28 May. Orders came down from London on 11 June that all the sloops and frigates in the Sound were to be sent to sea immediately as the coast from Berry Head to Mount's Bay was infested with smugglers. Amelia, Amethyst, Blanche, and Rosario were immediately victualled for two months. By the end of August 1802, Amelia had sailed for Den Helder with Dutch troops discharged from the British service. She returned on 4 September.

1803 saw Amelia based mainly at Portsmouth. She arrived there from the Downs on 27 March and sailed on 1 April with part of the 83rd (County of Dublin) Regiment of Foot for Jersey. She was back on 8 April and sailed again for the Downs on the 15th.

In May she was part of the squadron under Rear Admiral Edward Thornbrough in Raisonnable, keeping watch over Hellevoetsluis, Flushing, Netherlands and other Dutch ports. Amelia sent a French chasse-marée in ballast into Plymouth on 23 May. A month later, on 25 June, Amelia, Escort, Jackal, and Minx captured sundry Dutch fishing boats. (Note: A seaman's share of the prize money was worth 6s 0 3/4d.)

On 11 August Amelia sent the French privateer lugger Alerte, of 4 guns and 27 men, into Portsmouth. She chased two others in mid-channel before returning on 16 August. She sailed again on a cruise two days later. The extent of her success against smugglers is hard to judge. On 14 August she did catch at sea one Henry Sothcott (born 1774), who was sentenced to 5 years pressed into the Navy for smuggling; he jumped ship within seven months.

=== West Indies (1804–1807) ===
Amelia deployed to the Leeward Islands Station, but her captain, Lord Proby, died on 6 August 1804 at age 25 at Surinam, from yellow fever. Captain William Charles Fahie took command while the ship was in Barbados. In December she captured the Spanish brig Isabella and the ship Conception, both laden with wine and brandy, and the ship Commerce, laden with cotton. Amelia returned to Deptford and in 1807 refitted at Sheerness.

=== Battle of Les Sables-d'Olonne ===
December 1807 saw Captain Frederick Paul Irby appointed to her for service in the English Channel and coast of Spain. He sighted three French 44-gun frigates (Calypso, Italienne and Sybille) near Belle Île on 23 February 1809 and Amelia and the brig Dotterel chased them all night. The following morning they had approached so close to the rearmost French ship that her companions had to haul up to her support. Naiad soon came into sight and the French made for the Sables d'Olonne. Rear Admiral Stopford and his squadron, who had been watching eight French sail-of-the-line standing into the Pertuis d'Antioche, came down to join them and stood in with Caesar, Defiance, Donegal, and Amelia. They opened fire, passing as near to the enemy as the depth of water permitted, and forced the frigates to run ashore at the top of high water. Amelia had her bowsprit shot through and she was hulled in several places but had no casualties. The French lost 24 men killed and 51 wounded. The three French frigates survived, but Cybèle was declared irreparable and broken up, while Italienne and Calypso were sold to commerce.

=== Battle of the Basque Roads (1809) ===
Amelia was present with Admiral Lord Gambier at the blockade of Basque Roads in April 1809. There she was directed to dislodge the French who were endeavouring to strengthen their position in Aix Roads. On 1 April she destroyed some batteries there. She was reconnoitering with Alcmene when Alcmene was wrecked on the Three Stones on the north end of the La Blanche shoal near the mouth of the Loire on 30 April. Amelia was instrumental in rescuing the crew and a great part of Alcmene's stores.

=== Action at Santander (1809–10) ===
On 15 May 1809 Lord Gambier ordered Captain Irby to investigate the situation at St Ander where an attack was about to be made by Spanish patriots on the French troops in the town. Statira joined him on 8 June but strong winds and current prevented them getting there before 10 June. As they approached they could see firing on shore and several vessels trying to escape from the harbour. The two British ships captured three French vessels: the corvette Mouche, of sixteen brass 8-pounders and 180 men; the brig Réjouie with eight 8-pounders; (Note: Rejouie had been launched in 1795 at Bayonne as a corvette-cannonière of 450 tons (French) displacement, and converted to a gabarre of 190 tons (French) displacement.) and a schooner, Mouche No. 7, with one 4-pounder gun. They also took two luggers: Légère, which was unseaworthy so her cargo was put on board Réjouie; and Notre Dame, a Spanish vessel the French had seized.

The aide-de-camp to General Ballestero reported that the town was in possession of the Spanish and that the French troops had all surrendered. Because of the large number of prisoners, Captain Irby sent Statira into the harbour with the prizes while Amelia remained off the coast in hopes of being able to render more assistance to the Spaniards. The corvette Mouche, which the sloop Goldfinch and the hired armed lugger Black Joke had recently engaged, had been a threat to British trade for some time. Lloyd's List reported that on 20 June the French corvette Mouche, of 18 guns and 180 men, with "Soldier's Cloathing, and Specie", the "French brig Resource laden with masts", and a "French schooner in Ballast" had arrived at Plymouth. They had arrived from St Ander and were prizes to Statira and Amelia. (Note: The corvette Mouche, of 29136/94 tons (bm), 100 ft 0 in (30.5 m) in length and 26 ft 5 in (8.1 m) in breadth, was auctioned off at Plymouth on 10 October 1809.)

Later, one of Captain Irby's contemporary reports states:

I have been cruising for these two months past between Bayonne and Santona. In addition to the troops I have observed under arms, there has been a great proportion of armed peasantry at Baquio, a small place to the westward of Rachidaes; as our boats were returning from destroying some batteries, they were attacked by armed peasantry alone, who were dispersed by shot from the ship, and also since they have assisted the French troops, when we captured a vessel laden with military stores from St. Ander.

— Captain Irby to Mr Croft, HMS Amelia, Coruña, 6 May 1810

Amelia and the British privateer Sorcière recaptured Wanstead on 3 April 1810. (Note: Sorciere was a lugger of 57 tons (bm), armed with four 12-pounder guns and carrying a crew of 30 men under the command of Thomas Gilbert. He had received a letter of marque on 12 May 1809.) After her recapture, her captors took Wanstead into Plymouth.

=== Capture of the privateer Charles (1810) ===
Amelia captured the corvette-built privateer Charles of Bordeaux on 8 November 1810 about 400 miles west of Finisterre (44°41′N 21°24′W). Amelia chased Charles for 13 hours, with the speed reaching as much as 12.5 knots. Charles, of 300 tons burthen (bm), was pierced for 22 guns but mounted twelve 6-pounder guns and eight 18-pounder carronades, all English measurement. She had a crew of 170 men under the command of Pierre Alexandre Marrauld. Charles was about eight months old, but was on her maiden cruise, having sailed from Lorient on 4 October bound for Île de France. Amelia arrived in Plymouth Sound on 16 November. (Note: One French source states that Charles was the former French frigate Semillante. This is difficult to reconcile with Irby's description of Charles as being of 300 tons (bm) and on her maiden cruise.)

=== Destruction of Amazone ===
On the morning of 24 March 1811 Captain James Macnamara in Berwick gave chase to the French frigate Amazone about 12 or 13 miles off the Barfleur lighthouse and forced her to take refuge in a rocky bay about a mile to the west of the lighthouse. Amelia, Niobe, and the brig-sloops Goshawk and Hawk, joined Berwick, hoping to launch an attack with boats. When the tides proved too strong for a boat attack, Niobe led in, with Amelia and Berwick following in succession, and they fired on Amazone for two hours, before sailing out. Amelia had one man killed and one wounded in the exchange. The British squadron sailed in again on the following morning to renew the attack but her crew had set fire to Amazone and she had burned to the waterline.

=== Passage to Canada (1811) ===
Leaving Lymington on 11 April 1811, Amelia sailed for Canada with a convoy. On 18 June she left Quebec carrying General Sir James Henry Craig from Canada to England when he was relieved as Governor-General.

=== West African Station (1811–1813) ===
On 15 October 1811 Amelia sailed for the coast of Africa where Captain Irby became senior officer of the anti-slavery squadron there. Throughout her time on the station Amelia suffered with damp powder. Although the large portion which had caked in the magazine was sent ashore to be dried, the problem was never properly solved. In June 1812 Irby learned that the natives at Winneba, halfway between Accra and Cape Coast Castle, had murdered Mr Meredith, the governor of the fort. When the authorities at Cape Coast Castle asked for Captain Irby's assistance he sailed for Winneba with a detachment of the Africa corps under Mr Smith, Governor of Fort Tantumquery, and anchored off the port on 2 July. The natives had fled so he landed his marines and the troops, who demolished the fort.

In January 1813 Lieutenant Pascoe had to run his gunbrig Daring on shore and burn her at the island of Tamara, Iles de Los, after being chased by three French vessels. Two days later he and part of his crew arrived in the river of Sierra Leone where Amelia was about to leave for England, with many of her crew debilitated with fever and barely fit for duty after more than 12 months on the station. Before leaving, Captain Irby sent Lieutenant Pascoe off in a small schooner to reconnoitre.

=== Amelia and Aréthuse ===
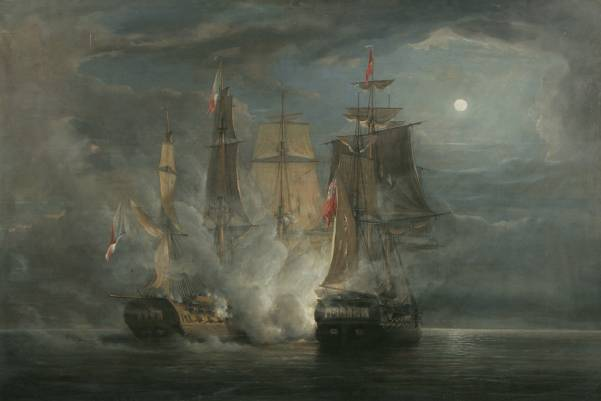
1852 painting of the battle by John Christian Schetky

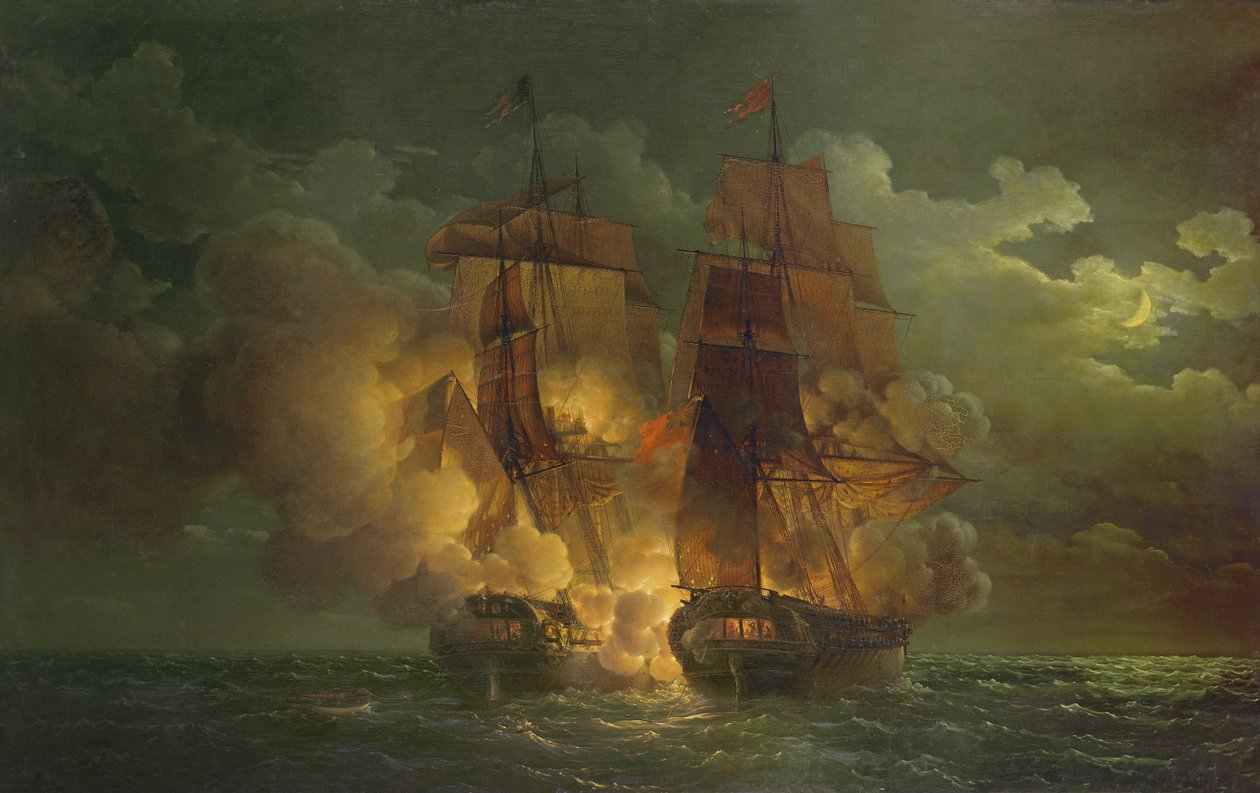
Painting of the battle by Louis-Philippe Crepin

Pascoe reported back on 3 February that he had sighted a force consisting of three ships. Two were the French frigates Aréthuse (Captain Pierre Bouvet), and Rubis (Commander Louis-François Ollivier). The third ship was a Portuguese prize, La Serra, which they were unloading before sailing to intercept British merchant vessels, a convoy from England being expected daily. The master and the rest of the crew from Daring arrived in a cartel, having given their parole, and confirmed Lieutenant Pascoe's report. Standing in towards Tamara on 6 February, Captain Irby met the government schooner Princess Charlote and learnt that the two frigates were anchored a considerable distance apart. Although he was not aware of it, Rubis, the southernmost one, had struck a rock, which had disabled her. Aréthuse weighed and stood out to sea followed by Amelia, Captain Irby having hopes of enticing her into action. For nearly four hours they exchanged fire, throughout which Aréthuse used the usual French practice of firing high. Having cut Amelia's sails and running and standing rigging to pieces, the French ship bore up. Twice during the action the enemy had attempted to board but the marines, under the command of Lieutenant Simpson of the Royal Marines, drove them back.

The British losses were heavy, with 46 killed, including Lieutenants John Bates, John Pope and George Wills, Lieutenant William Pascoe, the commander of Daring, and Second Lieutenant R G Grainger, Royal Marines. Five more men died of their wounds later. Fifty-one were dangerously or seriously wounded, and 44 slightly wounded. Captain Irby appointed Lieutenant Reeve, invalided from Kangaroo and wounded several times in the action, as his first lieutenant, and master's mates Samuel Umfreville and Edward Robinson (who had been severely wounded) as second and third. Mr Williamson, the surgeon, his assistant Mr Burke and Mr Stewart of Daring cared for the wounded as the crippled Amelia made her way north towards Madeira and then home, arriving at Spithead on 22 March. The wounded were examined by the Lieutenant Governor of the Royal Hospital at Greenwich who was astonished at their debilitated condition.

Aréthuse mounted twenty-six 18-pounder long guns on the main deck and fourteen 24-pounder carronades and two 8-pounder long guns on the upper deck. Amelia put more than 30 round shot in her hull on the starboard side below the quarterdeck and, according to one report, the French suffered at least 31 killed and 74 wounded; French accounts report 20 killed and 88, to 98 wounded. Still, Aréthuse arrived in St Malo on 19 April. Rubis was burnt on 8 February when it was found impossible to re-float her. A flavour of the intensity of the battle may be gained from William James writing in his Naval History of Great Britain, 1793 – 1827:

The Amelia ... in attempting a second time to cross her antagonist, a second time fell on board of her; and the two ships now swang close alongside, the muzzles of their guns almost touching. This was at about 9 h. 15 m. p.m., and a scene of great mutual slaughter ensued. The two crews snatched the spunges out of each other's hands through the portholes, and cut at one another with the broadsword. The Amelia's men now attempted to lash the two frigates together, but were unable, on account of the heavy fire of musketry kept up from the Aréthuse decks and tops; a fire that soon nearly cleared the Amelia's quarterdeck of both officers and men ... Here was a long and bloody action between two (taking guns and men together) nearly equal opponents, which gave a victory to neither. Each combatant withdrew exhausted from the fight; and each, as is usual in the few cases of drawn battles that have occurred, claimed the merit of having forced the other to the measure.

In addition to her ship's company, she brought at least one passenger: Exbury parish baptism register records the baptism on 6 June 1813 of a boy, "Irby Amelia Frederick, aged 9 or 10, a native of Poppoe near Whidah, Africa, who was stolen as a slave, but rescued at sea by HMS Amelia" – it is recorded in the Baptismal Register of 1813 as being "in grateful testimony of the humanity and intrepidity of his gallant deliverer".

=== Reserve at Portsmouth and Mediterranean service (1813–1816) ===
Amelia paid off at Portsmouth in May 1813, underwent a small repair, and then was placed in ordinary. The Honourable Granville Proby, younger brother of Lord William Proby, who had died in command in 1804, recommissioned her for a cruise in 1814. She was in Leghorn in December 1816, and was broken up at Deptford that same month, having given 30 years of continual wartime service to both the French and British navies.

== Commanding officers ==
From	To	Captain
September 1797	1802	Captain the Honourable Charles Herbert
April 1802	6 August 1804	Captain William Allen Proby, Lord Proby (died in command)
January 1805	February 1805	Captain John Woolcombe
February 1805	June 1805	Lieutenant Charles Eakins (acting)
June 1805	May 1806	Captain William Charles Fahie
May 1806	October 1807	Captain William Champain
October 1807	1813	Captain Frederick Paul Irby
1814	1816	Captain the Honourable Granville Proby
