= French frigate Aréthuse (1812) =

Frigate in the French Navy

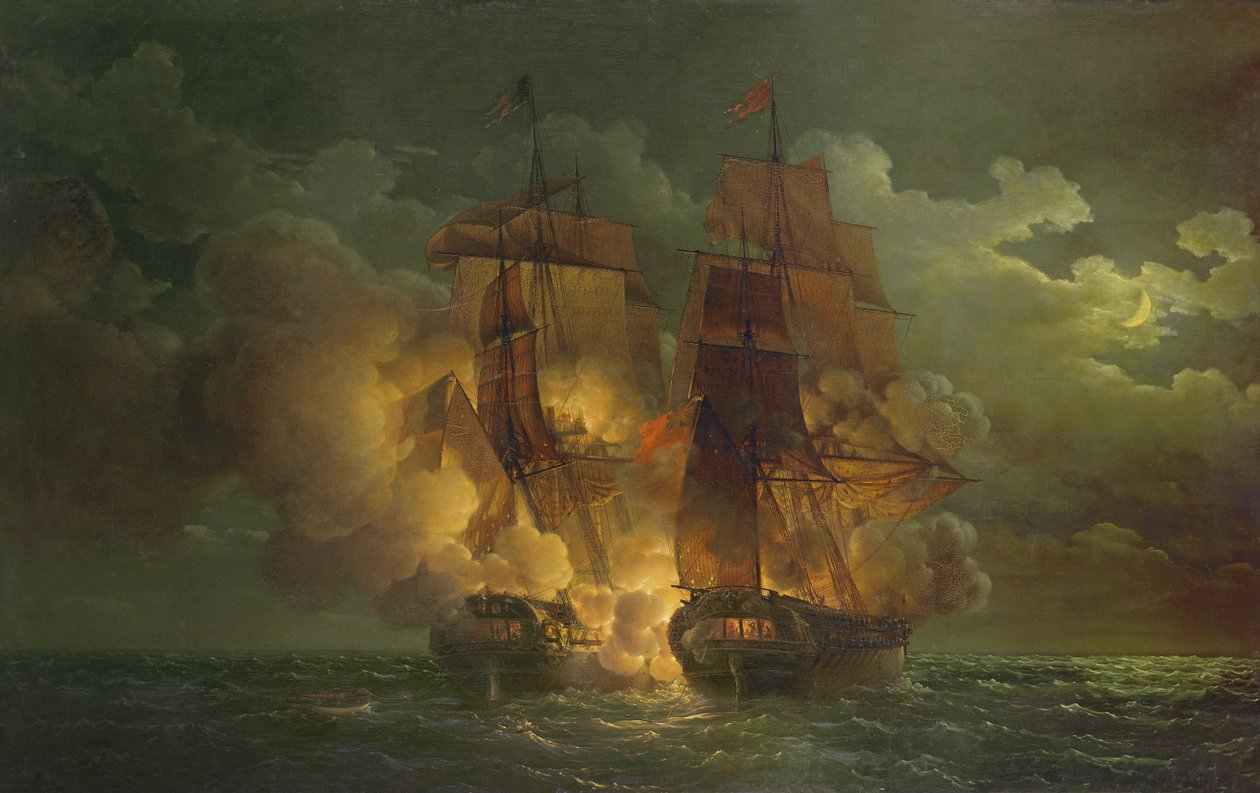
- Aréthuse (left) at the action of 7 February 1813

History

France
- Name: Aréthuse
- Namesake: Arethusa
- Builder: Nantes, France
- Laid down: 1807
- Launched: 15 May 1812
- Out of service: 1861
- Fate: Broken up in 1865.

General characteristics
- Class & type: Pallas-class frigate
- Displacement: 1,080 tonnes
- Length: 46.93 m (154 ft 0 in)
- Beam: 11.91 m (39 ft 1 in)
- Draught: 5.9 m (19 ft 4 in)
- Propulsion: 1,950 m^{2} (21,000 sq ft) of sail
- Complement: 326
- Armament: Nominally 40 guns; In practice carried either 44 or 46 guns: Battery: 28 18-pounders; Quarterdeck & forecastle: 8 × 8-pounder long guns; 8 × 36-pounder carronades or 12 × 18-pounder carronades

Aréthuse was a frigate of the French Navy. She served during the Napoleonic Wars, taking part in a major single-ship action. Much later the vessel took part in the conquest of Algeria, and ended her days as a coal depot in Brest, France.

== Construction and career ==
Aréthuse was laid down at Paimboeuf near Nantes, France in 1807 and launched on 15 May 1812. The ship was a frigate of the Pallas group, the latest iteration of the French Navy's standard Hébé class designed by Jacques-Noël Sané (also copied by the Royal Navy as the Leda class) and had design dimensions of 144 pieds 6 pouces by 36 pieds 8 pouces (corresponding to 154 feet (47 m) by 39 feet 1 inch (11.91 m)).

Like her sisters, the Aréthuse was designed to carry a broadside of fourteen pairs of 18-pounder long guns on the main gundeck, supported by additional cannon allocated to the open quarterdeck and forecastle, which since 1810 had been standardised at eight pairs of 24-pounder carronades and two 18-pounder chase guns. However, according to her captain Pierre Bouvet, the brackets of the bitts beneath the forecastle blocked the recoil of the two pairs of main-deck 18-pounders nearest the bows, and he had these guns removed into the hold for use as extra ballast, regarding the improvement in the ship's sailing qualities as more than compensation for the reduction in broadside weight. The main battery was thus reduced to twelve pairs of 18-pounders, and there seems to be little confirmation of precisely what calibre of guns were really carried on her quarterdeck and forecastle. The ship was capable of carrying provisions for a voyage of six months, but when fully loaded, the gunports had less than six pieds of freeboard (6 pieds being roughly 6.4 feet (2.0 m)).

In keeping with the army-style manpower organisation introduced in the French Navy at that date, the crew of Aréthuse consisted predominantly of conscripts from the Quatrième équipage de haut-bord ("4th tall ship crew"). The conscript crew proved to have an unexpected advantage, however, when the frigate was ordered to sail on a winter cruise before the crew's cold-weather clothing was ready - the number of tailors' apprentices on board allowed the necessary garments to be manufactured at sea by the crew themselves.

=== Cruise off West Africa, 1812–1813 ===
On 28 November 1812, Bouvet loaded the material for his crew's new uniforms on board, and later that day the Aréthuse and her sister-ship Rubis sailed from Nantes to intercept British trade off West Africa. In January, having captured a Portuguese ship, La Serra, they reached Cap-Vert. They also captured Little Belt, J. Wilson, master, sailing from Altea to London, Friends, Houston, master, sailing from Teneriffe to Belfast, and a Spanish brig sailing from Mallorca to Puerto Rico. The French put the masters and crews on Delphina, a Portuguese they had captured and plundered. Delphina arrived at Pernambuco on 31 January. (Note: Little Belt was a brig of 173 tons (bm) built in Canada in 1811. Her owner was J. Pozin.)

On 27 January 1813, Aréthuse intercepted the brig HMS Daring (Lieutenant Pascoe) off Tamara (one of the Iles de Los off Guinea). Pascoe ran Daring aground and set fire to her to avoid her capture. The French managed to take part of her crew prisoner but released them against their parole and put them in a boat. Pascoe and those of his men who had escaped capture sailed to the Sierra Leone River, where they arrived the next day. There they reported the presence of the French frigates to HMS Amelia (Captain Frederick Paul Irby).

In the night of 5 February, a storm threw Rubis ashore, wrecking her. The same storm damaged Aréthuse' rudder. Rubis was abandoned and set afire, while Aréthuse effected her repairs.

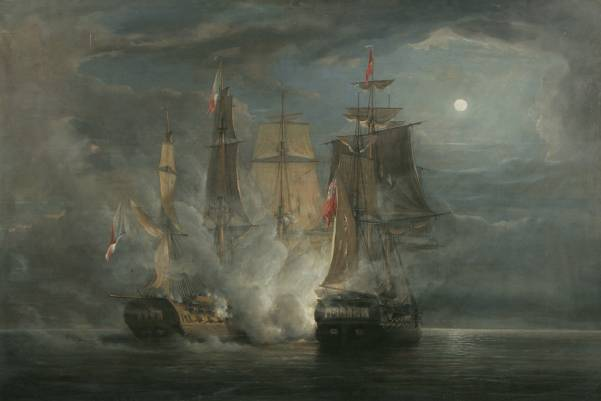
HMS Amelia in action with the French frigate Aréthuse, 1813, by John Christian Schetky, 1852

On 6 February, Amelia, guided and reinforced by sailors from Daring, attacked Aréthuse. A furious, 4-hour night battle followed. Aréthuse and Amelia disabled each other by shooting at their sails and rigging. Eventually the ships parted, neither able to gain the upper hand, and both with heavy casualties: Amelia had 46 killed and 51 wounded; Aréthuse suffered over 20 killed and 88 wounded, and 30 round shot had struck her hull on the starboard side below the quarterdeck.

Aréthuse returned to the wreck of Rubis to gather her crew, and returned to France. Soon afterwards Aréthuse captured the British privateer Cerberus, and arrived back in St Malo on 19 April having taken 15 prizes. (Note: Cerberus, a brig of 294 tons (bm), was armed with ten 9 and 4-pounder guns, and six 18-pounder carronades. Her master, John Tregowith, had received a letter of marque on 13 January 1813.)

=== Later career and disposal ===
The Aréthuse took part in the Invasion of Algiers in 1830 as a transport. In 1833, she was razeed into a corvette, reducing her forecastle to a sail-handling platform in the bows and her quarterdeck to a roof over the stern cabin, so that the main gundeck became an open flush deck, carrying a revised armament of eleven pairs of the new 30-pounder short guns.

The conversion was regarded as producing a very fast ship, with the added advantages of relatively shallow draught and very high gunport freeboard (fully loaded, these are quoted at 5.38 metres (17.7 ft) and 2.15 metres (7.1 ft) respectively), but limited the habitable space on board. The reconstruction was completed in 1834, but Aréthuse was only returned to active service in 1841, then decommissioned in 1851, or according to other sources, 1861, and used as a coal depot at Brest until being broken up in 1865.
