= Margaret (1804 ship) =

History

United Kingdom
- Name: Margaret
- Builder: J. Gilmour & Co., Calcutta
- Launched: 1804
- Captured: 1808

France
- Name: Entreprenant
- Acquired: 1808 by capture
- Fate: Currently unknown

General characteristics
- Tons burthen: 250, 275, or 269, or 270, or 2759/94 (bm)
- Propulsion: Sail
- Sail plan: Brig
- Armament: 1808:2 × 6-pounder + 8 × 12-pounder guns; 1808:10 × 12-pounder carronades; 1808:2 × 9-pounder guns + 8 × 12-pounder carronades
- Notes: Teak-built

Margaret was launched at Calcutta in 1804 and cost 59,000 sicca rupees to build. Shortly after her launch she sailed to England for the British East India Company (EIC). Captain Benjamin Fergusson sailed from Calcutta on 3 December 1805. She was at Saugor on 14 February 1806. She reached Saint Helena on 29 April and arrived at The Downs on 24 June.

In England she was admitted to the Registry of Great Britain on 6 August. A government report states that she became a West Indiaman, but there is no confirmatory evidence. Despite having been admitted to the British registry, Margaret does not appear in Lloyd's Register. She does appear in the Register of Shipping in 1809 with Ferguson, master and owner, and trade London–India.

The French captured Margaret in the Persian Gulf in 1808. Captain H. Wilson reported that the French naval felucca Entreprenante (or Entreprenant), Lieutenant Pierre Bouvet, captured Margaret on 9 February 1808. The felucca initiated the chase the day before at point about 63 miles SSW of Bombay as Margaret was bound for Basra. and after a long chase and an exchange of fire, Wilson struck to Entreprenant.

The French immediately put their captives on Entreprenant, and took over Margaret (or Marguerite), which they then sailed to Île de France. When he switched his vessels, Bouvet called his prize Entreprenant as well.

Margaret/Entreprenant arrived at Port-Napoleon, Île de France, in April. One French source describes her as a brand new 10-gun brig of the British East India Company. Her fate subsequent to her arrival at Île de France is blurry. She may have been sold into commerce in November.

When Bouvet put Wilson and his crew on board the felucca, Bouvet did not mention that the felucca also had on board the crew of a local vessel Entreprenant had captured off Kutch. After the French left, these men came on deck armed and forced Wilson and his men into the forecastle, where they remained in captivity for six days on minimal rations of biscuits and water. Eventually their captors left Wilson and his men at Danou.

Note: It is possible that the sources are conflating two Margarets. The British Library gives Margaret's origin as Chittagong, her managing owners as Downie & Maitland, and her burthen as 250 tons, but her master as Benjamin Fergusson. The other sources, which are not entirely independent of each other, give her owner and master as Benjamin Fergusson, her origin as Calcutta, and her burthen as 275 tons. Phipps is in the second group, but also reports that there was a Margaret, of 300 tons (bm), launched at Chittagong in 1794. A report from 1809 lists a Margaret, of 250 tons, owned by Downie and Maitland, with John Kitson, master.
