= French patamar Entreprenant =

19th-century French Navy vessel

History

France
- Name: Entreprenant
- Namesake: "Entreprising"
- Builder: Grisard, Port-Napoléon (Port-Louis), Île de France
- Laid down: September 1807
- Launched: October 1807
- Captured: 1808
- Fate: Unknown
- Acquired: 1808 by exchange
- Fate: Captured 1808

General characteristics
- Length: Overall:21.44 m (70.3 ft); Keel:14.6 m (48 ft)
- Beam: 4.87 m (16.0 ft) (overall)
- Complement: 40
- Armament: 1 × 12-pounder long gun or 1 × 8-pounder long gun, or 1 × 12-pounder carronade on a pivot mount at the bow

Entreprenant was the first of a sequence of three vessels of the French Navy in 1807–1810 under the same name and with the same captain. She was a patamar launched in 1807 at Île de France (now Mauritius). She cruised in Indian waters against British shipping. Her captain in 1808 turned her over to her prisoners from a capture. After he left, one set of prisoners captured her from another and she then disappears from further records.

== Career ==
In 1806 Lieutenant de vaisseau Pierre Bouvet was a prisoner in Bombay, where he observed the indigenous ships of the patamar type. Back in Île de France, Bouvet suggested the use of armed patamars to General Decaen, Governor General of the French possessions in the East Indies, to conduct reconnaissance and raids on the British. At this point, the defence of Isle de France had already led the authorities to purchased civilian ships into service, such as Robert Surcouf's 18-gun privateer Revenant.

Decaen agreed to construct a ship to test Bouvet's ideas. Grisard built Entreprenant to Bouvet's design at a cost of 96,138 francs.

In October 1807, after a six-week construction period, the patamar or felucca was ready. This vessel had two masts sharply raked forward at an angle of 23 degrees from the vertical, and 15 pairs of oars. She was named and commissioned on 30 November 1807.

Entreprenant served at Île de Bourbon and cruised the north-west coast of India from 7 December 1807. During these cruises Entreprenant took a number of prizes. One of these was the English merchant brig Marguerite, which he captured on 8 February 1808. Marguerite, under the command of Captain Wilson, was of 270 tons (bm), and carried ten 12-pounder carronades.

The French immediately put their captives on Entreprenant, and took over Margaret, which they then sailed to Île de France. When he switched his vessels, Bouvet called his prize Entreprenant as well.

When Bouvet put Wilson and his crew on board the felucca, Bouvet did not mention that the felucca also had the crew of a local vessel Entreprenant had captured off Kutch. These men came on deck armed and forced Wilson and his men into the forecastle, where they remained in captivity for six days on minimal rations of biscuits and water. Eventually, their captors left Wilson and his men at Danou. There is no further information on either Entreprenant's fate.
