= HMS Daring (1804) =

Brig of the Royal Navy

History

United Kingdom
- Name: HMS Daring
- Ordered: June 1804
- Builder: Jabez Bayley, Ipswich
- Laid down: June 1804
- Launched: October 1804
- Commissioned: November 1804
- Fate: Scuttled 27 January 1813

General characteristics
- Class & type: Archer-class gun-brig
- Tons burthen: 17840/94 (bm)
- Length: Overall: 80 ft 2 in (24.4 m); Keel:65 ft 10 3/4 in (20.1 m)
- Beam: 22 ft 6 3/4 in (6.9 m)
- Depth of hold: 9 ft 5 in (2.9 m)
- Sail plan: Brig
- Complement: 50
- Armament: 10 × 18-pounder carronades, and 2 chase guns

HMS Daring was a 12-gun gun-brig of the Archer class of the British Royal Navy. She was launched in 1804 and served in the Channel and North Sea, capturing a number of merchant vessels. In 1813 she was serving on the West Africa Station when her crew had to scuttle her to prevent her capture.

== History ==
Daring was built under contract by Jabez Bailey, of Ipswich, and launched in October 1804. Lieutenant Charles Ormsby commissioned her in November 1804. On 13 August 1805 Daring detained the Danish ship Venners Aventure. Vennerus Aventura, Neilson, master, was sailing from Amsterdam to Naples. Daring sent her into Cowes.

Lieutenant George Hayes took command in November 1805. serving in the Channel and the North Sea. On 8 April 1806 Daring shared with the Hardy and Moucheron in the capture of Minerva. Daring and Hardy also shared the capture of Anna Charlotta, Frederica de Liefde, and Pomona on 7, 8, and 9 April. On the 9th, Daring sent Anna Charlotta, Smith, master, and Delesse, Ball, master, from Bordeaux, into Plymouth. Daring also sent the brig Bachus, sailing from Baltimore to Hamburg, into Portsmouth. A few days later, Daring sent Josephine, which had been sailing from Bordeaux to Altona, into Portsmouth too. In mid-August, Daring sent into Portsmouth "Alexander, O'thman, master, which had been sailing from Bordeaux to Cherbourg."

About a year later, towards the end of August 1807, Daring sent into Portsmouth Slark, which had been sailing from Oporto to Tonningen. On 31 August Daring captured Odin. Oden, a galliot from Arundahl, came into Portsmouth on 4 September.

In 22 November 1808 Daring and Encounter recaptured the schooner Hope. Hope, Allen, master, had been sailing from Plymouth to London when was first captured; she arrived at Portsmouth on the 23rd. That same day, Daring was in company with Coquette when they captured Espiegle.

In August 1809, Daring served in the Walcheren Campaign, in the West Scheldt, being detached under Sir Home Popham to take soundings. Daring was at the siege of Flushing, and was instrumental in saving the brigs Reynard and Cracker after they had grounded within point-blank shot of the enemy.

On 29 April 1810, Daring was in company with Armide at the captured of the Aimable Betsie. On 6 November Daring escorted a convoy from Plymouth. Hayes left Daring in November 1810.

In December 1810 she was under the command of Lieutenant Thomas Allen.

Lieutenant Campbell replace Allen in 1811, but Lieutenant William R. Pascoe replaced Campbell in June. He recommissioned her as she was fitting out at Sheerness before proceeding to the coast of West Africa. Pascoe and Daring sailed for West Africa in March 1812. Towards the later end of March, Daring had to put into Vigo. She was convoying three transport ships laden with Government stores for Africa, and one of them, Alfred, Chapman, master, had sprung a leak.

On 9 June Daring captured the ship Esperanza. Later, on 30 June, Daring captured the schooner Centinella. Then on 5 July Daring captured the brig St Carlos.

== Fate ==
On 27 January 1813 Pascoe was forced to run Daring aground on Tamara (one of the Iles de Los off Guinea), and burn her to avoid the French frigates Aréthuse and Rubis capturing her. Pascoe had approached a group of three ships believing them to be Brazilian slavers. When he discovered that the three were two French frigates and their prize, he attempted to flee, but was unable to do so. Rather than surrendering Daring Pascoe scuttled her. Pascoe and his crew then escaped to Sierra Leone in several small trading boats.

Pascoe arrived in the Sierra Leone River with the greater part of his crew on 28 January and reported to Captain Frederick Paul Irby of Amelia.

Irby sent Pascoe back in a small schooner to reconnoitre. Pascoe reported back that the two frigates were unloading a Portuguese prize before preparing to sail to intercept British home-bound trade.

After Pascoe returned on 4 February he found that a cartel had arrived with the master and crew of Daring. Captain Irby, his crew depleted by sickness but reinforced by the men from Daring, sailed to attack the French vessels, hoping that on the way he might join up with any Royal Navy vessels in the area. He eventually engaged Aréthuse, which was anchored well to the north of Rubis, and which came out to meet him. Rubis did not join the fight; unbeknownst to Irby, she had struck a rock that had disabled her). Amelia engaged Aréthuse for four hours and suffered heavy casualties - 51 killed (including Lieutenant Pascoe), and 95 wounded. The two vessels then disengaged and Amelia sailed off.

Although she had been badly damaged, Amelia returned to Britain via Madeira. Aréthuse returned to the stranded Rubis. The French burnt Rubis on 8 February when it turned out that they could not refloat her.
