= James Saumarez, 5th Baron de Saumarez =

British soldier (1889–1969)

The Right Honourable The Lord de Saumarez DL

High Sheriff of Suffolk
- In office 1932–1932
- Preceded by: Arthur Churchman, 1st Baron Woodbridge
- Succeeded by: Algernon Henry Mackworth Praed

Personal details
- Born: James St Vincent Broke Saumarez; 29 November 1889
- Died: 16 January 1969 (aged 79)
- Spouse: Gunhild Balck (m. 1914; died 1969)
- Relations: Dai Llewellyn (grandson); Roddy Llewellyn (grandson); Eric Saumarez, 7th Baron de Saumarez (grandson)
- Children: 4, including James
- Parent(s): James Saumarez, 4th Baron de Saumarez; Jane Anne Vere-Broke
- Education: Harrow School
- Alma mater: Trinity College, Cambridge

James St Vincent Broke Saumarez, 5th Baron de Saumarez (Note: Saumarez is pronounced "Sommeray".) DL (29 November 1889 – 16 January 1969) was a British soldier.

== Early life ==
James St Vincent Broke Saumarez was born on 29 November 1889. He was the only son of James Saumarez, 4th Baron de Saumarez and Jane Anne Vere-Broke (1853–1933). He had three older sisters, Hon. Evelyn Saumarez (who married Sir John Wood, 2nd Baronet), Hon. Marion Saumarez (an artist), and Hon. Gladys Saumarez, neither of whom married.

His paternal grandparents were Col. John Saumarez, 3rd Baron de Saumarez, and the former Caroline Esther Rhodes (a daughter of William Rhodes of Kirskill Hall, Yorkshire, and Bramhope Hall, Yorkshire). His maternal grandparents were Capt. Charles Acton Vere-Broke and Anna Maria Hamilton (a daughter of John Hamilton of Sundrum). His mother was the heiress her uncle, Adm. Sir George Broke-Middleton, through which the Saumarez family inherited Shrubland Park at Coddenham, Suffolk, Broke Hall at Ipswich, and Livermore Park at Bury St Edmunds in Suffolk.

He was educated at Harrow, before attending Trinity College, Cambridge.

== Career ==
He fought in World War I, where he was wounded, achieving the rank of Captain in the Scots Guards. He served as aide-de-camp to Air Marshal Hugh Trenchard, 1st Viscount Trenchard between 1918 and 1919.

He served as High Sheriff of Suffolk in 1932. Upon the death of his father, James on 25 April 1937, he succeeded as the 5th Baron de Saumarez, in the Island of Guernsey in the Peerage of the United Kingdom, as well as the 5th Baronet Saumarez, in the Island of Guernsey in the Baronetage of the United Kingdom. He held the office of Deputy Lieutenant of Suffolk between 1937 and 1964.

In 1946 he founded the Rhodesia Fairbridge Memorial College, named in honor of Kingsley Fairbridge. Between 1946 and 1962, 276 British child migrants were sent to Rhodesia with an emphasis was put on education. The Memorial College was set up in a deserted airbase outside Bulawayo.

== Personal life ==
On 30 April 1914, he married Gunhild Balck (1889–1985), daughter of Maj.-Gen. Sir Viktor Gustaf Balck, a Swedish Army officer and sports personality who was one of the original members of the International Olympic Committee and served as president of the International Skating Union for 30 years. Together, they were the parents of:

- Hon. Veronica Saumarez (1915–2002), who married Brig. Anthony William Allen Llewellen Palmer, High Sheriff of Wiltshire, son of Col. William Llewellen Palmer (a son of Brig.-Gen. George Palmer) and Lady Alexandra Wynn-Carington (a daughter of the 1st Marquess of Lincolnshire), in 1945.
- Hon. Christine Saumarez (1916–1998), who married equestrian Sir Henry Llewellyn, 3rd Baronet, son of Sir David Llewellyn, 1st Baronet, and Magdalene Anne Harries (a daughter of Rev. Henry Harries), in 1944.
- Hon. Philip St. Vincent Saumarez (1917–1935), who died at age 18.
- James Victor Broke Saumarez, 6th Baron de Saumarez (1924–1991), who married Joan Beryl Charlton, daughter of Douglas Raymond Charlton, in 1953.

In 1949, Lady de Saumarez donated a group of Japanese prints acquired by her father-in-law to the British Museum.

Lord Saumarez died on 16 January 1969 and was succeeded in the barony by his second son, James.

=== Descendants ===
Through his daughter Christine, he was a grandfather of Dai and Roddy Llewellyn. Through his son James, he was the grandfather of the present peer, Eric Saumarez, 7th Baron de Saumarez.

== Notes ==
Peerage of the United Kingdom
Preceded by James St Vincent Saumarez	Baron de Saumarez; 1937–1969	Succeeded by James Victor Broke Saumarez
