= George Broke-Middleton =

Royal Navy Admiral (1812–1887)

Admiral Sir George Broke-Middleton Bt CB
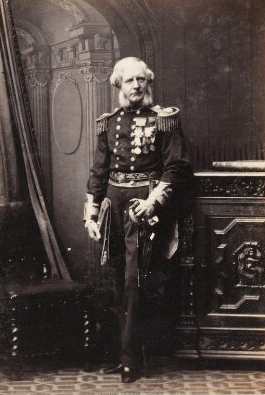
- Photograph of Sir George Broke-Middleton, Bt, 1865

High Sheriff of Suffolk
- In office 1864–1864
- Preceded by: John Brooke
- Succeeded by: John Reade

Personal details
- Born: George Nathaniel Broke; 26 April 1812; Stoke Damerel, Plymouth, Devon
- Died: 14 January 1887 (aged 74); Shrubland Park, Coddenham, Suffolk
- Spouse: Albinia Maria Evans Rushbrooke (after 1853)
- Parent(s): Sir Philip Broke, 1st Baronet; Louisa Middleton

Admiral Sir George Nathaniel Broke-Middleton, 3rd Baronet, CB (26 April 1812 – 14 January 1887) was a British Royal Navy officer.

== Early life ==
Broke-Middleton was the second son of eleven children born to Sarah Louisa Middleton and Sir Philip Broke, 1st Baronet, a Royal Navy officer who served in the French Revolutionary and Napoleonic Wars and the War of 1812.

His paternal grandparents were Elizabeth Beaumont and Philip Bowes Broke of Broke Hall, Nacton, near Ipswich (a grandson of Philip Broke and descendant of Sir Richard Broke, who served as Chief Baron of the Exchequer). His maternal grandparents were Sir William Fowle Middleton, 1st Baronet and Harriot Acton (the daughter and eventual heiress of Nathaniel Acton of Bramford Hall, Suffolk).

== Career ==
He entered the Royal Navy as a midshipman on 16 August 1825. By 4 November 1840, he had gained the rank of Commander while serving on HMS Thunderbolt. On 18 December 1845, he was promoted to the rank of captain, and in 1855 took command of HMS Gladiator, seeing active service in the Crimean War. In 1858, Broke took command of HMS Centurion, and in March 1859 became captain of HMS Hero. The following month he was invalided out of regular naval service. He was promoted to the rank of retired Rear Admiral on 3 December 1863, Vice Admiral on 1 April 1870 and Admiral on 22 January 1877.

On 4 February 1855, he succeeded to his unmarried older brother's baronetcy. He was appointed a Companion of the Order of the Bath (CB) in July 1855. In 1860, Broke assumed the additional surname of Middleton after inheriting the estate of his cousin, Sir William Fowle Fowle Middleton, 2nd Baronet. In 1864, he served as High Sheriff of Suffolk.

== Personal life ==
On 27 August 1853 at Ghent, Belgium, Broke married Albinia Maria (née Evans) Rushbrooke (1821–1905), daughter of Thomas Evans, after she had been divorced by her husband, Maj. Robert Frederick Brownlow Rushbrooke, on the grounds of her adultery with Broke.

Broke-Middleton died at Shrubland Park on 14 January 1887, and the baronetcy became extinct. His Suffolk estates were inherited by a niece, Lady de Saumarez, formerly Jane Anne Broke, the daughter of his brother Capt. Charles Acton Broke (who had married Anna Maria Hamilton, daughter of John Hamilton of Sundrum). In 1882, she had married James Saumarez, 4th Baron de Saumarez, and the estates, including Shrubland Park at Coddenham, Suffolk, Broke Hall at Ipswich, and Livermore Park at Bury St Edmunds in Suffolk, thus passed into the Saumarez family. The inheritance made Lady de Saumarez the largest owner of London real estate in the aristocracy outside of the Duke of Westminster, which she held until the Middleton Estate, as it was known, was sold in 1921.

Political offices
Preceded by John Brooke	High Sheriff of Suffolk; 1864	Succeeded by John Reade
Baronetage of the United Kingdom
Preceded by Philip Broke	Baronet (of Broke Hall); 1855–1887	Extinct
