= James Saumarez, 4th Baron de Saumarez =

British diplomat and peer (1843–1937)

The Right Honourable The Lord de Saumarez
- Born: James St Vincent Saumarez; 17 July 1843; London, England
- Died: 25 April 1937 (aged 93); Saumarez Park, Guernsey
- Education: Eton College; Cheltenham College
- Alma mater: Trinity College, Cambridge
- Spouse: Jane Anne Broke (m. 1882, died)
- Children: 4, including James
- Parent: John Saumarez, 3rd Baron de Saumarez

James St Vincent Saumarez, 4th Baron de Saumarez (Note: Saumarez is pronounced "Sommeray".) (17 July 1843 – 25 April 1937), was a British diplomat and peer, for some forty-five years a member of the House of Lords.

== Early life ==
Saumarez was born in London on 17 July 1843, while his parents were living at 41, Prince's Gate, South Kensington. He was the eldest son of Colonel John Saumarez, 3rd Baron de Saumarez, an army officer, by his marriage to Caroline Esther Rhodes (1818–1846).

His paternal grandparents were Adm. James Saumarez, 1st Baron de Saumarez, and Martha Le Marchant. His maternal grandfather was William Rhodes of Kirskill Hall, Yorkshire, and Bramhope Hall, Yorkshire.

He was educated at Eton, Cheltenham College, and Trinity College, Cambridge, where he matriculated in the Lent term of 1861 and graduated BA in 1863, promoted to MA in 1867.

== Career ==
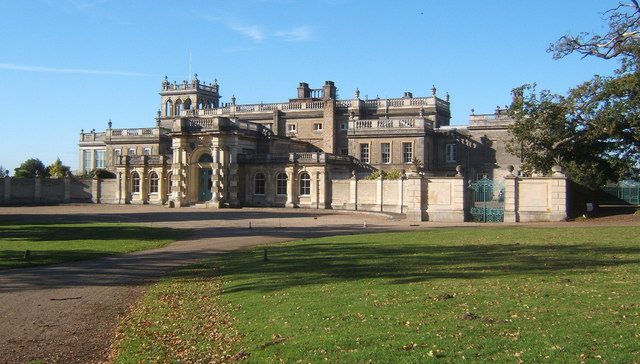
Shrubland Hall, inherited by Lady de Saumarez in 1887

After rising to the rank of captain in the Grenadier Guards, Saumarez joined the Diplomatic Service in 1867. His overseas postings were to Paris (1868), Berlin (1872), Athens (1873), Japan (1875), Paris and Rome (1880), and Brussels (1881). While in Paris in 1871, he was witness to the Commune rioting. In 1882, he served as Second Secretary in the British embassy to the King of the Belgians.

He retired from the Diplomatic Corps in 1885, and in 1891 succeeded his father as the 4th Baron de Saumarez, in the Island of Guernsey in the Peerage of the United Kingdom, as well as the 4th Baronet Saumarez, in the Island of Guernsey in the Baronetage of the United Kingdom.

=== Estates ===
In 1869, he exercised his droit de retraite (right of redemption) to buy Saumarez Park and the Le Guet estate at Castel on the island of Guernsey, after his father, the third Baron, had put the property up for sale. He spent many years in developing Saumarez Park, including building a Japanese house and temple there. He acquired the temple in Japan, had it dismantled and shipped to Europe, then re-erected it on his Guernsey estate.

In 1887, on the death of her uncle Admiral Sir George Broke-Middleton, his wife inherited the Shrubland Park at Coddenham, Suffolk, Broke Hall at Ipswich, and Livermere Park at Great Livermere near Bury St Edmunds in Suffolk. In London, they lived at 43 Grosvenor Place in Belgravia, which was close to Grosvenor Square (and, today, is directly opposite the American Embassy). Lady de Saumarez's inheritance made her the largest owner of London real estate in the aristocracy outside of the Duke of Westminster, which she held until the Middleton Estate, as it was known, was sold in 1921.

== Personal life ==
On 10 October 1882, Saumarez married Jane Anne Vere-Broke (1853–1933), eldest daughter of Capt. Charles Acton Vere-Broke and Anna Maria Hamilton (a daughter of John Hamilton of Sundrum). Jane, who was born at Zante, Ionian Islands, was the granddaughter of another Royal Navy officer, Adm. Sir Philip Broke, "Broke of the Shannon". Together, they were the parents of three daughters and a son:

- Hon. Evelyn Saumarez (1883–1934), who married Sir John Wood, 2nd Baronet, son of Sir John Wood, 1st Baronet and Estelle Benham (a daughter of Henry Benham), in 1919.
- Hon. Marion Saumarez (1885–1978), an artist who never married.
- Hon. Gladys Saumarez (1887–1975), who died unmarried.
- James St Vincent Broke Saumarez, 5th Baron de Saumarez (1889–1969), who married Gunhild Balck, daughter of Maj.-Gen. Sir Viktor Gustaf Balck, in 1914.

In 1912 his portrait was painted by Thérèse Geraldy. In 1914, Lord Saumarez sold his portrait of Penelope Lee Acton by George Romney to Duveens for £45,000. He died at Saumarez Park in 1937, and was succeeded by his son, James.

=== Descendants ===
Saumarez had several grandchildren by his son and his daughter Evelyn. His granddaughter Christine Saumarez married the equestrian Harry Llewellyn and was the mother of Dai and Roddy Llewellyn. He is also the great-grandfather of the present peer, Eric Saumarez, 7th Baron de Saumarez.

== Coat of arms ==
Coat of arms of James Saumarez, 4th Baron de Saumarez
Coronet A coronet of a Baron Crest A Falcon displayed proper. Escutcheon Argent on a Chevron Gules between three Leopards' Faces Sable as many Castles triple-towered Or. Supporters Dexter: an Unicorn tail between the legs Argent navally gorged Azure charged on the shoulder with a Castle triple-towered Or; Sinister: a Greyhound Argent collared Gules rimmed Or charged on the shoulder with a Wreath of Laurel Vert encircling an anchor Sable. Motto In Deo Spero (I hope in God)

== Notes ==
Peerage of the United Kingdom
Preceded by John St Vincent Saumarez	Baron de Saumarez; 1891–1937	Succeeded by James St Vincent Saumarez
