= Philip Broke (disambiguation) =

Sir Philip Broke (1776–1841) was a Royal Navy officer, captain of HMS Shannon when she defeated USS Chesapeake.

Philip Broke may also refer to:

- Philip Broke (Ipswich MP) (1702–1762), English politician
- Sir Philip Broke, 2nd Baronet (1804–1855), Royal Navy officer, of the Broke-Middleton baronets

== See also ==
- Broke (disambiguation)
