= James de Saumarez =

James de Saumarez may refer to:

- James Saumarez, 1st Baron de Saumarez (1757–1836), British Royal Navy admiral
- James Saumarez, 2nd Baron de Saumarez (1789–1863), Baron de Saumarez
- James Saumarez, 4th Baron de Saumarez (1843–1937), British diplomat and peer
- James Saumarez, 5th Baron de Saumarez (1889–1969), Baron de Saumarez
- James Saumarez, 6th Baron de Saumarez (1924–1991), Baron de Saumarez
