= Sir David Llewellyn, 1st Baronet =

Welsh industrialist and financier (1879–1940)

Sir David Llewellyn Bt JP
- Born: David Richard Llewellyn; 9 March 1879; Aberdare, South Wales
- Died: 15 December 1940 (aged 61); Tynewydd, Hirwaun, Glamorganshire
- Education: Llandovery College
- Alma mater: Cardiff University
- Spouse: Magdalene Anne Harries (m. 1905)
- Children: 8, including Rhys, Henry and David
- Father: Rees Llewellyn
- Relatives: Dai Llewellyn (grandson); Roddy Llewellyn (grandson)

Sir David Richard Llewellyn, 1st Baronet JP (9 March 1879 – 15 December 1940) was a Welsh industrialist and financier.

== Early life ==
Llewellyn was born in Aberdare, South Wales on 9 March 1879. He was the son of Elizabeth Llewellyn and Rees Llewellyn (1851–1919), JP and High Sheriff of Breconshire. His paternal grandparents were David Llewellyn and Elizabeth (née Jones) Llewellyn.

He was educated at Llandovery College and Cardiff University.

== Career ==
Starting with one small colliery in 1905 his expertise with electrically driven cutters that could mine thin seams enabled him to systematically acquire a range of businesses across the south Wales coalfields.

He was a director of GKN and served as chairman of North's Navigation Colleries Ltd., Graigola Merthyr Company, and chairman of Welsh Associated Collieries Ltd in 1930. Sir David was a close friend of Lloyd George, the Liberal party Prime Minister of the United Kingdom from 1917 to 1922. In 1923, Llewellyn contracted to supply the United States with 1,000,000 tons of Welsh anthracite annually for five years.

On 31 January 1922, he was created 1st Baronet Llewellyn, of Bwllfa, Aberdare, County of Glamorgan in the Baronetage of the United Kingdom. He held the office of Justice of the Peace for Glamorgan.

== Personal life ==
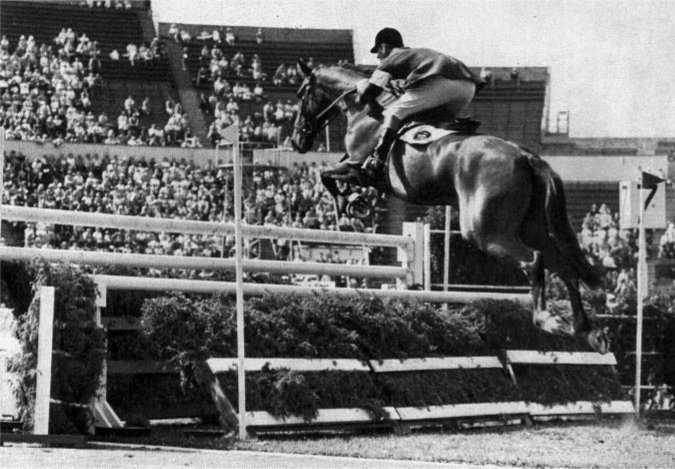
Photograph of his second son, Harry Llewellyn, at the 1952 Summer Olympics in Helsinki.

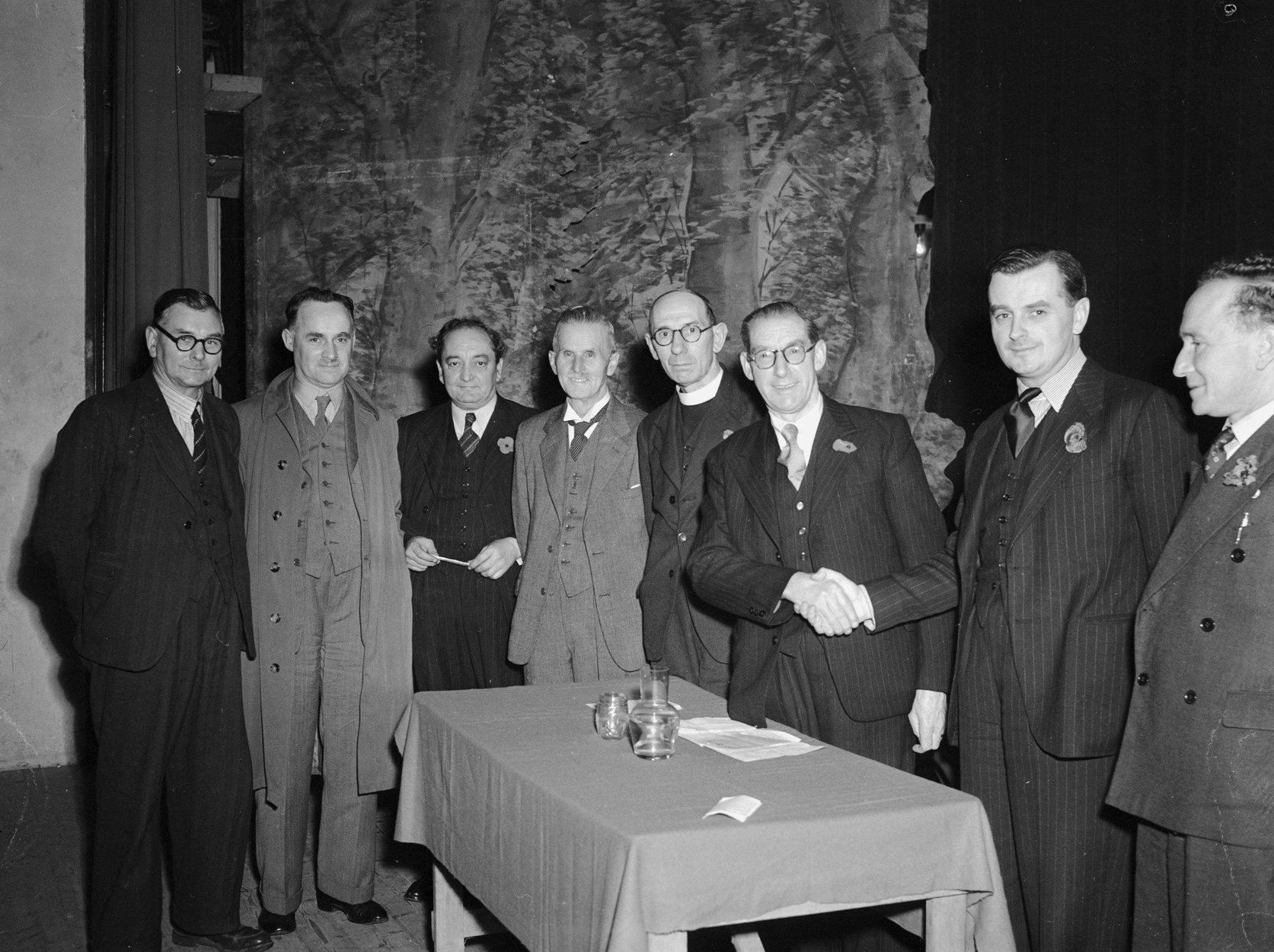
Photograph of his third son, Sir David Treharne Llewellyn, visiting Maesteg, 1951

On 19 April 1905, Llewellyn married Magdalene Anne Harries, a daughter of Rev. Henry Harries of Porthcawl. Together, they lived at Bwllfa, Aberdare, Glamorgan, Wales, and were the parents of:

- Sir Rhys Llewellyn, 2nd Baronet (1910–1978), the High Sheriff of Glamorgan; he died unmarried.
- Sir Henry Morton Llewellyn, 3rd Baronet (1911–1999), who married Hon. Christine Saumarez, daughter of James Saumarez, 5th Baron de Saumarez and Gunhild Balck (daughter of Sir Viktor Balck), in 1944.
- Margaret Elaine Llewellyn (1913–2002), who married Sir Donald Forsyth Anderson, son of Sir Alan Garratt Anderson, in 1935.
- Elizabeth Aileen Maud Llewellyn (1914–2011), who married Lt.-Col. David Matthew Caradoc Prichard, son of Col. Hubert Prichard and Nora Diana Piers, in 1946.
- Sir David Treharne Llewellyn (1916–1992), an MP for Cardiff North and Under-Secretary of State for the Home Department; he married Joan Anne Williams, daughter of Robert Henry Williams of Bonvilston House, Glamorgan, in 1950.
- Marjorie Joyce Llewellyn (1917–1971), a Warrant Officer in the Women's Auxiliary Air Force during World War II; she married Frank May Reid Byers, son of Sir John William Byers and Fanny Reid, in 1947.
- William Herbert Rhydian Llewellyn (1919–2008), a Major who served as High Sheriff of Cardiganshire; he married Lady Honor Morvyth Vaughan, daughter of Ernest Vaughan, 7th Earl of Lisburne and Regina de Bittencourt (a daughter of Don Julio Fermin Albert de Bittencourt), in 1943.
- Magdalene Clare Llewellyn (1922–1999), who married Alexander Wyndham Hume Stewart-Moore, son of James Stewart-Moore, in 1948.

Sir David died at his brother's house, Tynewydd, Hirwaun, Glamorganshire, on 15 December 1940, and was succeeded in the baronetcy by his eldest son, Rhys. His widow, Lady Llewellyn, died on 1 February 1966.

Baronetage of the United Kingdom
New creation	Baronet (of Bwllfa); 1922–1940	Succeeded by Rhys Llewellyn
