= Broke =

Broke may refer to:

== Arts, entertainment, and media ==
=== Film and television ===
- Broke (1991 film), a 1991 British television film by Stephen Bill in the anthology series ScreenPlay
- Broke (2009 film), a Canadian documentary film
- "Broke" (The Office), a 2009 episode of The Office
- Broke*, a 2011 film
- Broke, a 2012 film by Rakontur
- Broke, a 2012 film from Volume II of ESPN's 30 for 30
- Broke (2016 film), an Australian film
- Broke (2017 TV series), a web series
- Broke (2020 TV series), a sitcom
- Broke (2025 film), an American western drama film

=== Music ===
- Broke (album), a 2000 Hed PE album
- Broke, an album by Kazzer
- "Broke" (Modest Mouse song), a 1996 song by Modest Mouse
- "Broke", a song by The Beta Band from the album Hot Shots II
- "Broke", a song by Cassius Henry
- "Broke", a song by Nelly from the album 5.0
- "Broke", a song by Dean Brody from Right Round Here, 2023

=== Other uses in arts, entertainment, and media ===
- Broke: The Plan to Restore Our Trust, Truth, and Treasure, a 2010 book written by national TV and radio host Glenn Beck
- Broke: Who Killed the Middle Classes?
- Tony Broke, hero of the British comic strip Ivor Lott and Tony Broke
- Broke Records, American record label

== Other uses ==
- Broke baronets, two extinct titles, one in the Baronetage of England, the other in the Baronetage of the United Kingdom
- HMS Broke, three Royal Navy vessels
- Insolvent, as in "flat broke"
- Broke, New South Wales, a village in the Hunter Region of New South Wales
- Broke, Western Australia, a locality in the Shire of Manjimup, Western Australia
- Broke (surname)

== See also ==
- Bankruptcy
- Poverty
- Break (disambiguation)
- Broken (disambiguation)
- Broek (disambiguation)
