= Nant-y-derry =

Village in United Kingdom

Coordinates: 51°44′59″N 2°58′11″W

Nant-y-derry (Welsh: Nant-y-deri) is a village in the county of Monmouthshire, Wales, located six miles south east of Abergavenny and four miles northwest of Usk.

== History and amenities ==
The River Usk flows close by and the area is a rural agricultural part of the county.

Nant-y-Derry’s manor house, the Neoclassical Llanfair Grange, was the home of Harry Llewellyn in the mid-20th century. The Foxhunter Inn, a local pub, is named in honour of Llewellyn's famous horse, Foxhunter.

Celebrity chef and Market Kitchen presenter Matt Tebbutt, owns the Foxhunter and run it as a gastropub. Tebbutt tried to sell the pub in 2011 due to his busy television schedule, however following reaction from local residents he decided to take it off the market.

== Nantyderry Sunshine ==
Chrysanthemum 'Nantyderry Sunshine' is an herbaceous perennial to 90 cm in height, compact and bushy in habit, with button-like bright lemon-yellow flowers 3 cm in width, the inner florets tipped with deep orange-yellow. Breeding has led to many classifications amongst this group, some being good garden plants, others the preserve of the Chrysanthemum enthusiast and the show bench.

== See also ==
- Nantyderry railway station
