= William Wollaston (disambiguation) =

William Wollaston (1659–1724) was an English philosophical writer.

William Wollaston is also the name of:

- William Hyde Wollaston (1766–1828), English chemist
- William Wollaston (Ipswich MP elected 1733) (1693–1764), M.P. for Ipswich between 1733 and 1734
- William Wollaston (Ipswich MP elected 1768) (1730–1797), M.P. for Ipswich between 1768 and 1784
