= Llanfair Grange =

Country house in Nant-y-derry, Monmouthshire, Wales

- Location within Monmouthshire
- 51.7596°N 2.9683°W
- Type: House
- Location: Nant-y-derry, Monmouthshire

History
- Built: 18th century, with later remodelling

Site notes
- Architectural style: Neoclassical
- Governing body: Privately owned

Listed Building – Grade II
- Official name: Llanfair Grange
- Designated: 30 June 1993
- Reference no.: 2888

Llanfair Grange, Nant-y-derry, Monmouthshire is a country house dating from the 18th century. It was extensively remodelled in the early 19th century in a Neoclassical style. In the mid-20th century, the grange was owned by Harry Llewellyn, who founded the Foxhunter stud at the house, named after his most famous horse. The Grange was the childhood home of his two sons, Dai and Roddy. The house, a Grade II listed building, remains a private residence and was sold in August 2021.

== History and description ==
The origins of the house are believed to date from the 18th century. In the early 19th century, a large new block, in a Neoclassical style, was added to the front of the original house. The entrance frontage is of three storeys, while the rest of the building to the rear is of two storeys. The pillared porch was constructed as part of a remodelling of the frontage of the house, undertaken in the early 20th century.

The house was bought by Harry Llewellyn in the late 1940s. He established a stud at the grange, named after his most famous mount, Foxhunter, on which Llewellyn won Britain's only Gold medal at the 1952 Summer Olympics. The grange was the childhood home of Llewellyn's two sons, Dai, a socialite, and Roddy, a landscape gardener. Roddy Llewellyn's affair with Princess Margaret in the 1970s, and his brother's commentary upon it, led to a long rupture in their relations. (Note: The brothers reconciled before Dai’s Llewellyn's death at the age of 62 in 2009.)

Llanfair Grange remains a private residence and was designated a Grade II listed building in 1993. In August 2021 the house was sold.
