= Broke-Middleton baronets =

Extinct baronetcy in the Baronetage of the United Kingdom

Escutcheon of the Broke baronets of Broke Hall

The Broke, later Broke–Middleton Baronetcy, of Broke Hall in the County of Suffolk, was a title in the Baronetage of the United Kingdom. It was created on 2 November 1813 for Philip Broke, a Rear-Admiral of the Royal Navy. He was the grandson of Robert Broke, nephew of Sir Robert Broke, 1st Baronet, of Nacton (see Broke Baronets), who were both descended from Sir Richard Broke, Chief Baron of the Exchequer during the reign of Henry VIII. The second Baronet was Sheriff of Suffolk in 1844 and his younger brother the third Baronet was Sheriff of Suffolk in 1864. The third Baronet assumed the additional surname of Middleton in 1860 after inheriting the estate of his cousin Sir William Fowle Fowle-Middleton. The title became extinct on his death in 1887.

== Broke, later Broke–Middleton baronets, of Broke Hall (1813) ==
- Admiral Sir Philip Bowes Vere Broke, 1st Baronet (1776–1841)
  William, his second son, drowned, aged eleven, in a nearby pond where he had gone fishing alone, on 1 August 1823.
- Sir Philip Broke, 2nd Baronet (1804–1855)
- Admiral Sir George Broke-Middleton, 3rd Baronet (1812–1887)

== See also ==
- Broke baronets

Baronetage of the United Kingdom
Preceded by Beckett baronets	Broke-Middleton baronets of Broke Hall; 2 November 1813	Succeeded by Duckworth baronets
