= David Llewellyn (British politician) =

British politician

The Right Honourable Sir David Llewellyn

Under-Secretary of State for the Home Department
- In office 1951–1952 Serving with Sir Hugh Lucas-Tooth
- Preceded by: Geoffrey de Freitas
- Succeeded by: Sir Hugh Lucas-Tooth; The Lord Lloyd

Member of Parliament for Cardiff North
- In office 1950–1959
- Preceded by: New constituency
- Succeeded by: Donald Box

Personal details
- Born: David Treharne Llewellyn; 17 January 1916
- Died: 9 August 1992 (aged 76)
- Spouse: Joan Anne Williams (m. 1950; died 1992)
- Relations: Sir Rhys Llewellyn, 2nd Baronet (brother); Sir Henry Llewellyn, 3rd Baronet (brother)
- Children: 3
- Parent(s): Sir David Llewellyn, 1st Baronet; Magdalene Anne Harries
- Education: Eton College
- Alma mater: Trinity College, Cambridge

Sir David Treharne Llewellyn (17 January 1916 – 9 August 1992), was a British Conservative politician and junior minister.

== Early life ==
Llewellyn was the son of the Welsh industrialist Sir David Llewellyn, 1st Baronet. Sir Rhys and Sir Harry Llewellyn were his elder brothers.

He was educated at Eton College and Trinity College, Cambridge, graduating in 1938 with a Bachelor of Arts.

== Career ==
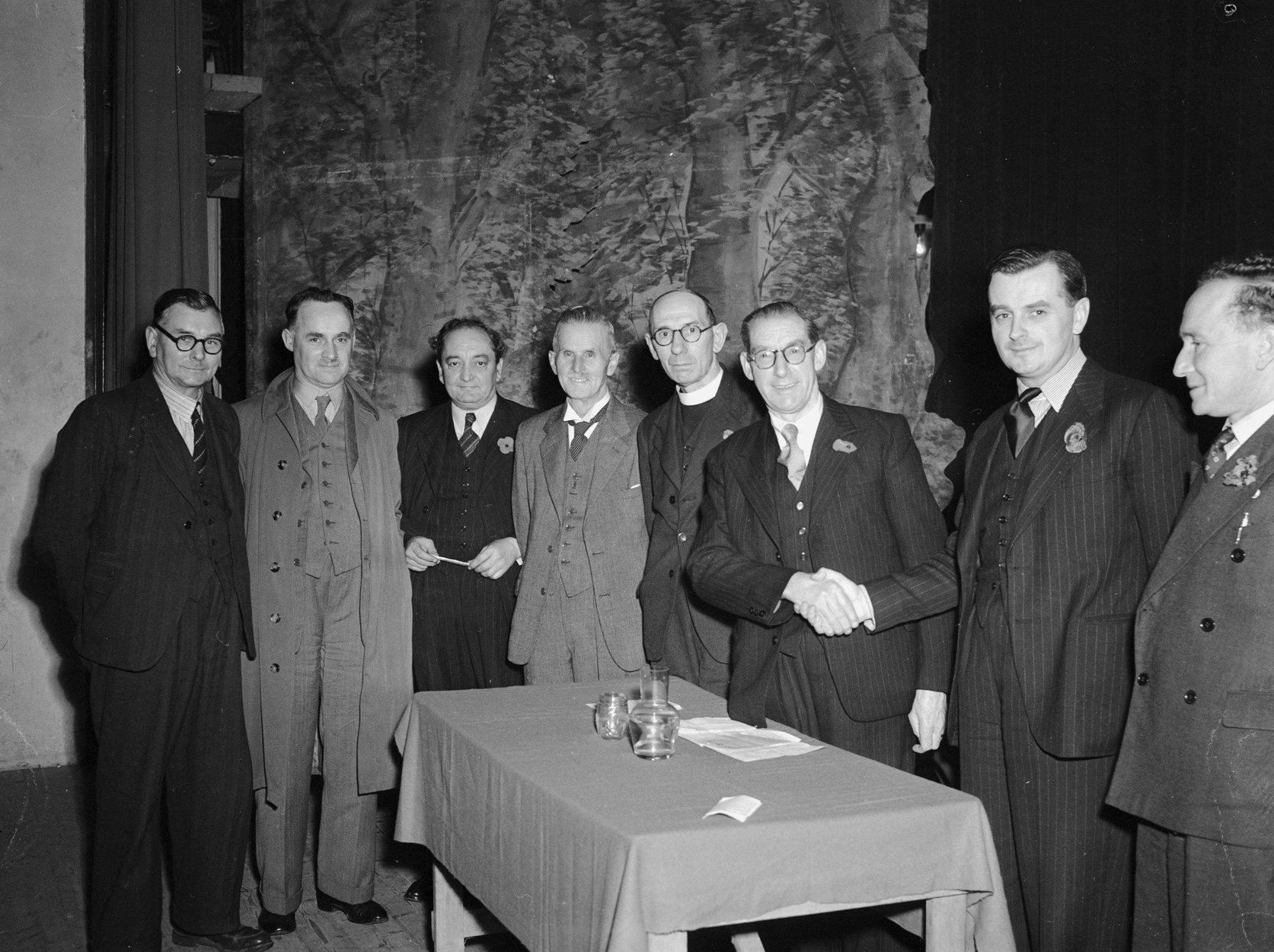
Photograph of Sir David, visiting Maesteg, 1951

He sat as member of parliament for Cardiff North from 1950 to 1959 and served under Winston Churchill as Under-Secretary of State for the Home Department from 1951 to 1952. He was created a Knight Bachelor, for political and public services, in the 1960 New Year Honours List.

== Personal life ==
On 18 February 1950, Llewellyn married Joan Anne Williams OBE (1916–2013), a daughter of Robert Henry Williams. She was head of the wartime Cabinet Office cypher office. Together, they had two sons and one daughter:

- Emma Victoria Llewellyn (b. 1951), who married Bruce H. Dinwiddy, son of T. L. Dinwiddy, in 1974.
- Robert Crofts Williams Llewellyn (b. 1952), who married Susan Constance Miller-Stirling, daughter of Hubert Miller-Stirling, in 1975. After her death in 1980, he married Lucinda Roberte Gilmour, daughter of Alexander Clement Gilmour, in 1981. They divorced in 1989 and he married Sarah Dominica Anderson, daughter of Maj. Gavin Campbell Anderson, in 1989.
- David Rhidian Llewellyn (b. 1957), who married Susan Edmiston, daughter of Edward Edmiston, in 1984. They divorced in 2001 and he married Rose Ellen Watkins, daughter of Richard Francis Watkins, in 2001.

Sir David died on 9 August 1992.

== See also ==
- Llewellyn Baronets of Bwlffa

Parliament of the United Kingdom
New constituency	Member of Parliament for Cardiff North; 1950–1959	Succeeded by Donald Box
Political offices
Preceded by Geoffrey de Freitas	Under-Secretary of State for the Home Department; 1951–1952; With: Sir Hugh Lucas-Tooth 1952	Succeeded by Sir Hugh Lucas-Tooth; The Lord Lloyd
