= Philip Broke (Ipswich MP) =

English landowner and Tory politician

- Born: 1702
- Died: 21 September 1762 (aged 59–60)
- Occupations: landowner, politician
- Known for: Member of Parliament (1730–1733)
- Political party: Tory
- Spouses: Anne Bowes (m. 1732): Alice Lady Barker
- Parents: Robert Broke of Nacton (father); Elizabeth Hewitt (mother)

Philip Broke (1702 – 21 September 1762), of Broke Hall, Nacton, Suffolk, was an English landowner and Tory politician who sat in the House of Commons from 1730 to 1733.

Broke was the eldest son of Robert Broke of Nacton and his wife Elizabeth Hewitt, daughter of John Hewitt, of Waresley, Huntingdonshire. In 1714, he succeeded his father to the family estate at Nacton. He was admitted at Pembroke College, Cambridge on 5 July 1726. He married Anne Bowes, daughter of Martin Bowes of Bury St. Edmunds in 1732.

Broke was returned as a Tory Member of Parliament for Ipswich after a contest at a by-election on 27 January 1730. He spoke against the Hessians on 4 February 1730, and voted consistently against the Government. He did not stand at the 1734 British general election. He married as his second wife Alice Lady Barker, widow of Sir John Barker, 6th Baronet, of Sproughton, Suffolk, daughter of Sir Comport Fytche, 2nd Baronet of Eltham, Kent.

Broke died on 21 September 1762 leaving one son by his first marriage, who was Philip Bowes Broke (1749–1801), the father of the Royal Navy officer Rear Admiral Sir Philip Bowes Vere Broke, 1st Baronet KCB (1776–1841).

Parliament of Great Britain
Preceded by William Thompson; Francis Negus	Member of Parliament for Ipswich; 1730–1734; With: Francis Negus 1730-1733; William Wollaston 1733-1734	Succeeded by Samuel Kent; William Wollaston
