= Broke baronets =

Extinct baronetcy in the Baronetage of the United Kingdom

There have been two baronetcies created for persons with the surname Broke, one in the Baronetage of England and one in the Baronetage of the United Kingdom. Both creations are extinct.

The Broke Baronetcy, of Nacton in the County of Suffolk, was created in the Baronetage of England on 21 May 1661 for Robert Broke, subsequently Member of Parliament for Suffolk. He was a descendant of Sir Richard Broke, Chief Baron of the Exchequer during the reign of Henry VIII. The title became extinct on Sir Robert's death in 1694. The Broke estates passed to his nephew Robert Broke, who was the grandfather of Philip V. Broke, who was created a baronet in 1813 (see below).

The Broke, later Broke-Middleton Baronetcy, of Broke Hall in the County of Suffolk, was created in the Baronetage of the United Kingdom on 2 November 1813. For more information on this creation, see Broke-Middleton baronets.

== Broke baronets, of Nacton (1661) ==
Escutcheon

- Sir Robert Broke, 1st Baronet (c. 1630–1694)

== Broke, later Broke-Middleton baronets, of Broke Hall (1813) ==
- see Broke-Middleton baronets
