= Llewellyn baronets =

Welsh noble peerage in United Kingdom

There have been two baronetcies created for persons with the surname Llewellyn, both in the Baronetage of the United Kingdom. One creation is extinct or dormant while one is extant.

The Llewellyn Baronetcy, of Bwllfa, Aberdare, in the County of Glamorgan, was created in the Baronetage of the United Kingdom on 31 January 1922 for David Llewellyn, a Welsh industrialist. He was notably Chairman of Welsh Associated Collieries. His first son, the second baronet, was High Sheriff of Glamorgan in 1950. His second son, the third baronet (who succeeded his elder brother), was a well-known equestrian. As of 2021 the title is held by the latter's second son, the fifth baronet (younger brother of the fourth baronet), who succeeded in 2009. He is a landscape gardener, gardening journalist, author and television presenter.

The Conservative politician Sir David Llewellyn was a younger son of the first Baronet and the younger brother of the second and third Baronets.

The Llewellyn Baronetcy, of Baglan in the County of Glamorgan, was created in the Baronetage of the United Kingdom on 20 January 1959 for Sir Godfrey Llewellyn, subsequently President of the National Union of Conservative and Unionist Associations. His son, the second Baronet, served as Lord Lieutenant of West Glamorgan from 1987 to 1994. On his death in 1994 the baronetcy became extinct or dormant.

== Llewellyn baronets, of Bwlffa (1922) ==
- Sir David Llewellyn, 1st Baronet (1879–1940)
- Sir Rhys Llewellyn, 2nd Baronet (1910–1978)
- Sir Henry Morton "Harry" Llewellyn, 3rd Baronet (1911–1999)
- Sir David St Vincent "Dai" Llewellyn, 4th Baronet (1946–2009)
- Sir Roderic Victor "Roddy" Llewellyn, 5th Baronet (born 1947)

The current heir presumptive is his first cousin, Robert Crofts Williams Llewellyn (born 1952), eldest son of Sir David Llewellyn.

The current heir presumptive's heir apparent is his son, Dominic Robin Crofts Llewellyn (born 1984), followed by the latter's son, David Join Crofts Llewellyn (born 2012), then by the former's uncle David Rhidian Llewellyn (born 1957) and then by his first cousin Trefor Wilmot Llewellyn (born 1947). There are no other heirs to the baronetcy.

Llewellyn Baronets, of Bwlffa, line of succession
- Sir David Richard Llewellyn of Bwllfa, 1st Baronet (1879—1940)
  - Sir Rhys Llewellyn, 2nd Baronet (1910—1978)
  - Sir Henry Morton Llewellyn, 3rd Baronet (1911—1999)
    - Sir David St. Vincent Llewellyn, 4th Baronet (1946—2009)
    - Sir Roderic Victor Llewellyn, 5th Baronet (born 1947)
  - Sir David Treharne Llewellyn (1916—1992)
    - (1) Robert Crofts Williams Llewellyn (born 1952)
      - (2) Dominic Robin Crofts Llewellyn (born 1984)
        - (3) David Join Crofts Llewellyn (born 2012)
    - (4) David Rhidian Llewellyn (born 1957)
  - Major William Herbert Rhydian Llewellyn (1919—2008)
    - (5) Trefor Wilmot Llewellyn (born 1947)

== Llewellyn baronets, of Baglan (1959) ==
- Sir (Robert) Godfrey Llewellyn, 1st Baronet (1893–1986)
- Sir Michael Rowland Godfrey Llewellyn, 2nd Baronet (1921–1994)
