= Baron de Saumarez =

Barony in the Peerage of the United Kingdom

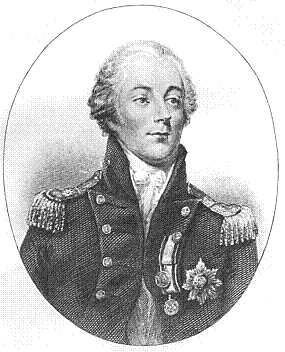
James Saumarez, 1st Baron de Saumarez

Baron de Saumarez, on the Island of Guernsey, is a title in the Peerage of the United Kingdom. It was created on 15 September 1831 for the prominent naval commander Admiral Sir James Saumarez, 1st Baronet. He had already been created a Baronet, of Guernsey, on 13 June 1801. Lord de Saumarez was succeeded by his eldest son James, the second Baron, a clergyman. James was succeeded by his younger brother, John, the third Baron, whose son, the fourth Baron, was a career diplomat who bought the family estate at Castel, Guernsey, from his father, the third Baron, who wished to sell it. However, by marrying an heiress, the fourth Baron also brought estates in Suffolk into the family.

The family seat was at Castel in Guernsey from the time of the first baron until the fourth Baron died there in 1937. After the German occupation of the Channel Islands during the Second World War, the later barons lived mostly at their Shrubland Park estate, near Ipswich, in Suffolk. As of 2015 the titles are held by the fourth Baron's great-grandson, the seventh Baron, who succeeded his father the sixth Baron in 1991. Although born and brought up in Suffolk, in April 2006, after the death of his mother, the present Lord de Saumarez sold Shrubland Park and settled in Guernsey.

Not be confused with Saumarez Park at Castel, the Sausmarez Manor estate at Saint Martin in Guernsey belongs to the senior line of the Sausmarez family, from which the Barons de Saumarez are descended. Matthew de Sausmarez (1718–1778), father of the first baron, was a younger brother of John de Sausmarez (1706–1774), of Sausmarez Manor.

== Barons de Saumarez (1831) ==
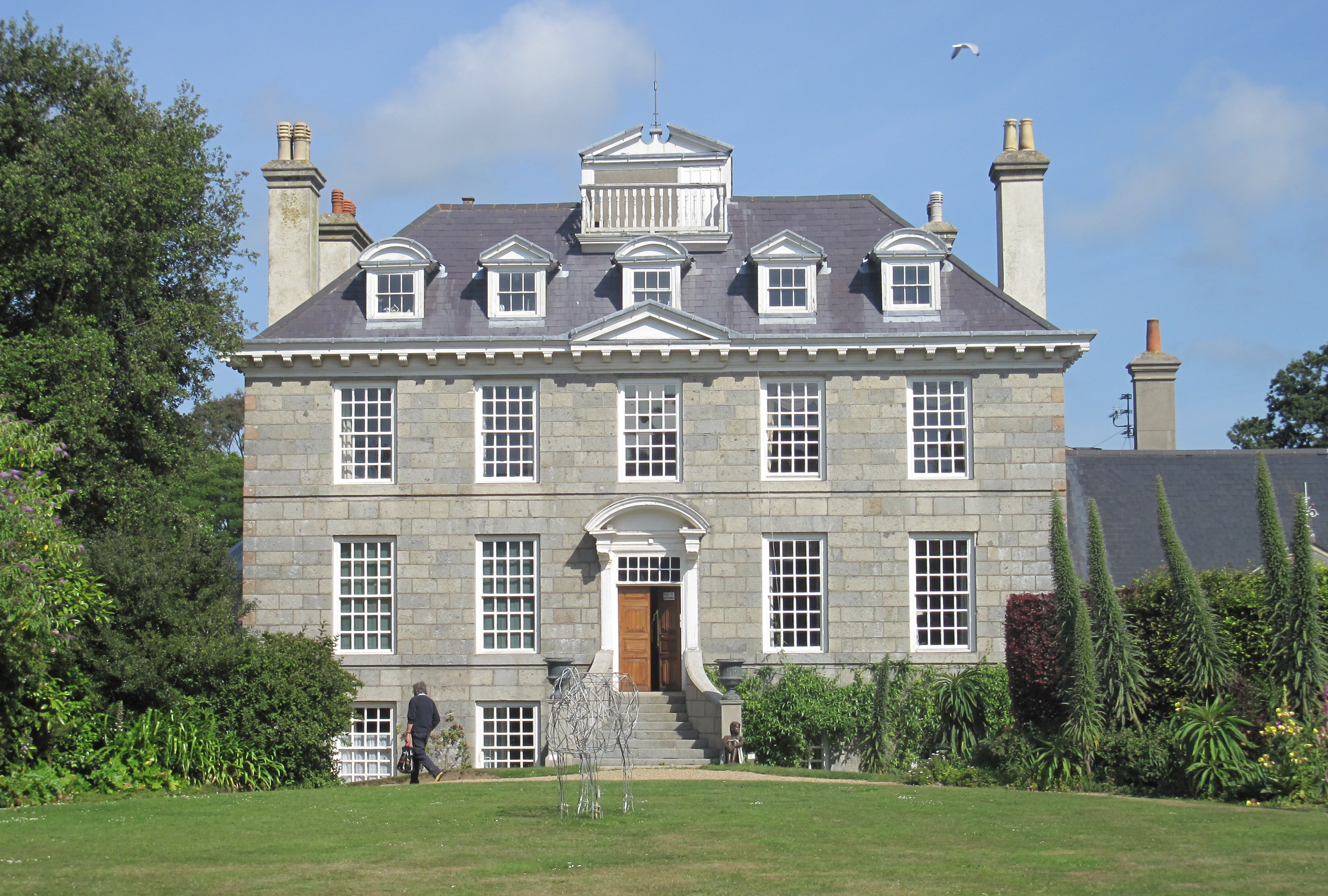
Sausmarez Manor, Guernsey

- James Saumarez, 1st Baron de Saumarez (1757–1836)
- James Saumarez, 2nd Baron de Saumarez (1789–1863)
- John St Vincent Saumarez, 3rd Baron de Saumarez (1806–1891)
- James St Vincent Saumarez, 4th Baron de Saumarez (1843–1937)
- James St Vincent Broke Saumarez, 5th Baron de Saumarez (1889–1969)
- James Victor Broke Saumarez, 6th Baron de Saumarez (1924–1991)
- Eric Douglas Saumarez, 7th Baron de Saumarez (b. 1956)

As the current Baron has no male issue, the heir presumptive to the barony is his younger twin brother, Hon. Victor Saumarez.

=== Coat of arms ===
Coat of arms of Baron de Saumarez
Coronet A coronet of a Baron Crest A Falcon displayed proper. Escutcheon Argent on a Chevron Gules between three Leopards' Faces Sable as many Castles triple-towered Or. Supporters Dexter: an Unicorn tail between the legs Argent navally gorged Azure charged on the shoulder with a Castle triple-towered Or; Sinister: a Greyhound Argent collared Gules rimmed Or charged on the shoulder with a Wreath of Laurel Vert encircling an anchor Sable. Motto In Deo Spero (I hope in God)

Baronetage of the United Kingdom
Preceded by Inglis baronets	De Saumarez baronets of Guernsey; 13 June 1801	Succeeded by Strachey baronets
