= HMS Broke =

Three vessels of the Royal Navy have been named HMS Broke, (pronounced brook) after Admiral Sir Philip Bowes Vere Broke of HMS Shannon:

- Broke was a cutter hired by the Royal Navy in 1814.
- HMS Broke (1914), a Faulknor-class flotilla leader launched in May 1914 at J. Samuel White, Cowes. Originally ordered by the Chilean Navy as Almirante Uribe, the vessel was transferred to the Royal Navy on the outbreak of the First World War before completion. She was returned to the Chilean Navy in 1920.
- HMS Broke (D83), a Thornycroft type leader built by J I Thornycroft, Woolston. She saw service in World War II and was sunk by gunfire on 8 November 1942 during Operation Terminal after cutting the boom and landing troops directly onto the pier at Algiers.
