= British Institute of Technology, England =

Education organization in London, United Kingdom

Coordinates: 51°32′46″N 0°1′24″E

- Type: Private
- Established: 1999
- Chancellor: Merlin Hay, 24th Earl of Erroll
- Students: Approx. 1,200
- Undergraduates: Approx. 600
- Postgraduates: Approx. 600
- Location: London, E7; United Kingdom
- Campus: Urban
- Website: https://biot.org.uk/

The British Institute of Technology, England (BITE), formerly the British Institute of Technology and E-commerce, is a private educational institute, also involved in consultancy and research, whose main campus is located in the London Borough of Newham, east London, England.

In 2021 it was refused registration by the UK Office for Students, having failed on three grounds.

== History ==
The British Institute of Technology, England was founded in 1999 in Newham, east London as a private educational Institute which is also involved in consultancy and research. BITE has worked on government-funded and private education projects since its foundation.

In 2012, BITE had been the 5th largest private higher educational establishment in the UK by number of students.

== Campuses and facilities ==
The institute's Stratford Campus is situated in Romford Road (the A118), 2 miles from Westfield Stratford City and the 2012 Olympic Park.

== Academic structure and subsequent failure ==
BITE had been subject to annual 'Review for Educational Oversight' inspections by the Quality Assurance Agency for Higher Education; it had been reviewed in January 2012 by the body, which expressed confidence in the organisation's then monitoring and reporting of academic standard quality.

But in 2021 it was refused registration by the UK Office for Students, having failed on Student protection, on Financial viability and sustainability and on Management and governance.
