= HMS Thunderbolt =

Four vessels of the Royal Navy have been named HMS Thunderbolt:

- HMS Thunderbolt (1696) was originally a French ship, but was captured in 1696 and commissioned into the Royal Navy. It was converted to a hulk in 1699 and broken up in 1731.
- HMS Thunderbolt (1842) was a wooden paddle sloop launched in 1842 and wrecked off South Africa in 1847.
- HMS Thunderbolt (1856) was an iron screw floating battery launched in 1856 and converted to a floating pier at Chatham in 1873. Between 1916 and 1919 it was named HMS Daedalus as a nominal depot ship for the Royal Navy Air Service. It sank in 1948 due to a collision with a tugboat, and was raised and broken up the following year.
- HMS Thunderbolt (N25) was a T-class submarine originally called HMS Thetis. Thetis sank during sea trials on 1 June 1939 with 4 survivors out of 103 people on board. The boat was raised, repaired, and commissioned in 1940 as HMS Thunderbolt and sunk on 14 March 1943 by the Italian corvette Cicogna.
