= Sir Rhys Llewellyn, 2nd Baronet =

Welsh mining executive, soldier, author and dignitary (1910-1978)

Lieutenant-Colonel Sir Rhys Llewellyn, 2nd Baronet, CStJ (9 March 1910 – 25 April 1978) was a Welsh mining executive, soldier, author and dignitary.

He was born in Aberdare, South Wales, the son of Sir David Llewellyn, 1st Baronet, a colliery owner, and his wife, Magdalene Anne, Lady Llewellyn (née Harries).

Educated at Oundle School and Trinity College, Cambridge, he was the Managing Director of Graigola Merthyr from 1934 to 1947; Master of the Brecon and Talybont Foxhounds from 1936 to 1940; an officer in the Welsh Guards during World War II; and High Sheriff of Glamorgan from 1950 to 1951.

== Death ==
Sir Rhys Llewellyn, 2nd Baronet, died unmarried on 25 April 1978, aged 68.

Baronetage of the United Kingdom
Preceded by David Llewellyn	Baronet (of Bwllfa); 1940–1978	Succeeded by Harry Llewellyn
