= Shrubland Hall =

English country house

Coordinates: 52.1300°N 1.1050°E

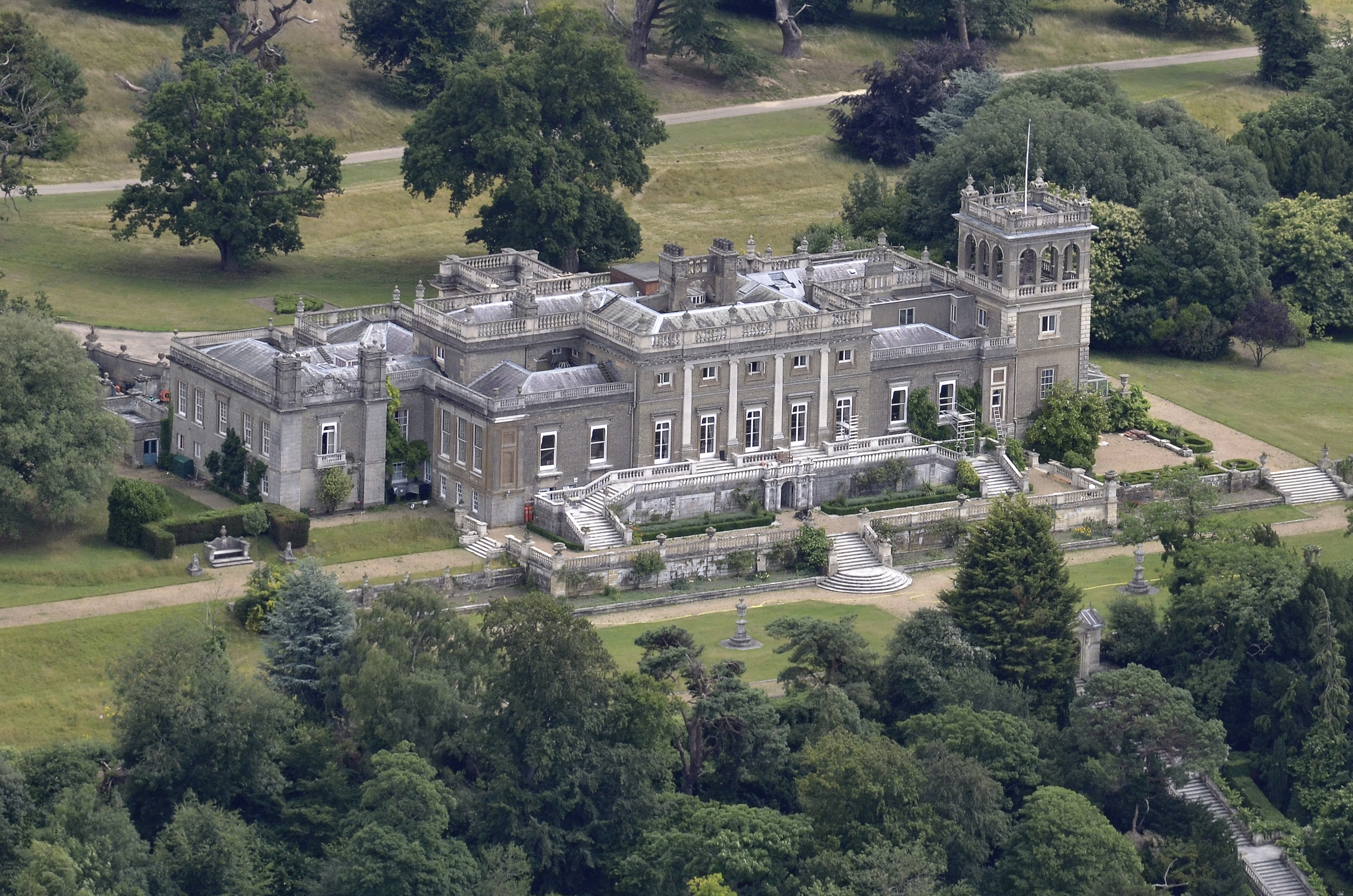
Shrubland Hall

Shrubland Hall, Coddenham, Suffolk, is an historic English country house with planned gardens in Suffolk, England, built in the 1770s.

The Hall was used as a health clinic in the second half of the 20th century and briefly reopened as a hotel, restaurant and spa in 2015 but shut in early 2017.

The parkland and formal gardens of the Palace are Grade I listed on the Register of Historic Parks and Gardens, and the hall itself is listed Grade II* on the National Heritage List for England.

== Current usage ==
In recent years, Shrubland Hall has been used as a restaurant, hotel, wedding and event venue. However, Shrubland Palace, also known as Shrubland Hall, did not appear on Suffolk County Council's 2024 list of approved wedding venues.

== Ownership and legal issues ==
The estate, also known as Shrubland Palace, is owned by the British Institute of Technology, which was fined £3,600 in September 2024 for the unauthorised erection of two structures on the historic property without planning permission.

== Conservation status ==
In November 2021, Shrubland Hall was added to Historic England's Heritage at Risk Register due to concerns about its deteriorating condition, including water damage and eroding stonework. The listing raised awareness of the urgent need for repairs and proper maintenance to preserve the estate's historical significance.

== History ==
The first recorded owner of the estate was Robert de Shrubeland, although there is evidence of occupation on the site since the Roman period. The previous Tudor-style Shrubland Hall was built by the Booth family in the early 16th century. The estate was later acquired by the Little family, and passed to the Bacon family when in 1581 Helen Little, daughter and heiress of Thomas Little (by his wife Elizabeth Lytton, a daughter and co-heiress of Sir Robert Lytton of Knebworth House in Hertfordshire), married Sir Edward Bacon (d.1618), the third son of Sir Nicholas Bacon, Lord Keeper of the Great Seal to Queen Elizabeth I, and a half-brother of the philosopher and statesman Sir Francis Bacon.

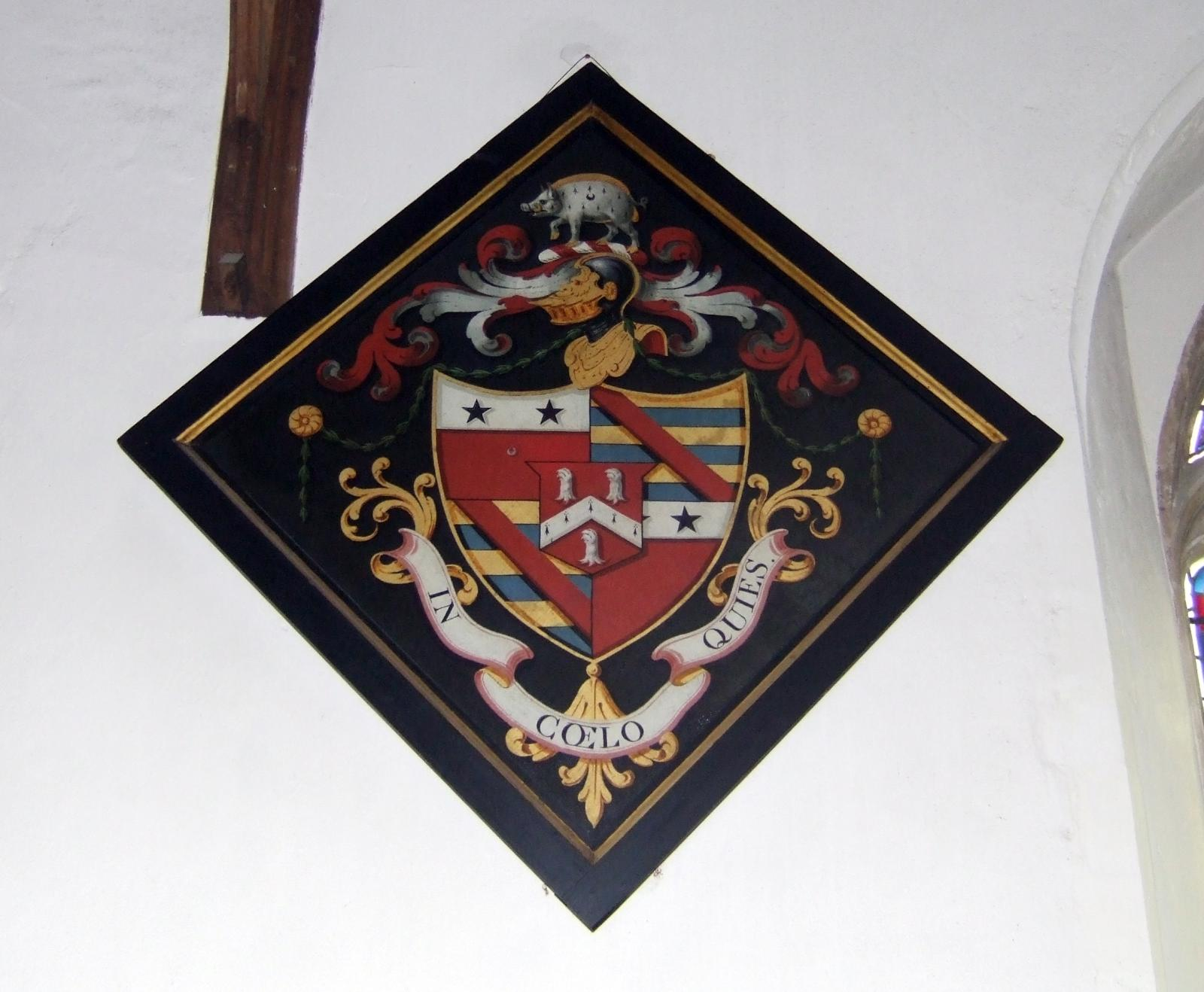
Funeral hatchment in Coddenham Church of Rev. Nicholas Bacon (d.1796) of Shrubland, last in the male line

The present Grade II* listed hall was designed by James Paine for the Revd. John Bacon in the early 1770s. His heir was his younger brother Rev. Nicholas Bacon (d.1796), Vicar of Coddenham, who died without issue and was the last in the male line, whose funeral hatchment survives in Coddenham Church (right). The house was then bought by Sir William Fowle Middleton, 1st Baronet, whose son and heir, Sir William Fowle Middleton, 2nd Baronet, commissioned architect John Gandy-Deering to remodel it in the early 1830s. There was further remodelling of the building for Sir William between 1849 and 1855 by Sir Charles Barry, who also created the terraced gardens. Paine's central block was built in 3 storeys with a 5-bay frontage, to which Gandy-Deering added 3 further bays to either side. The whole is constructed of Gault brick with dressings of limestone and stucco. The parkland was styled by Humphry Repton and still retains the deer park and walled garden.

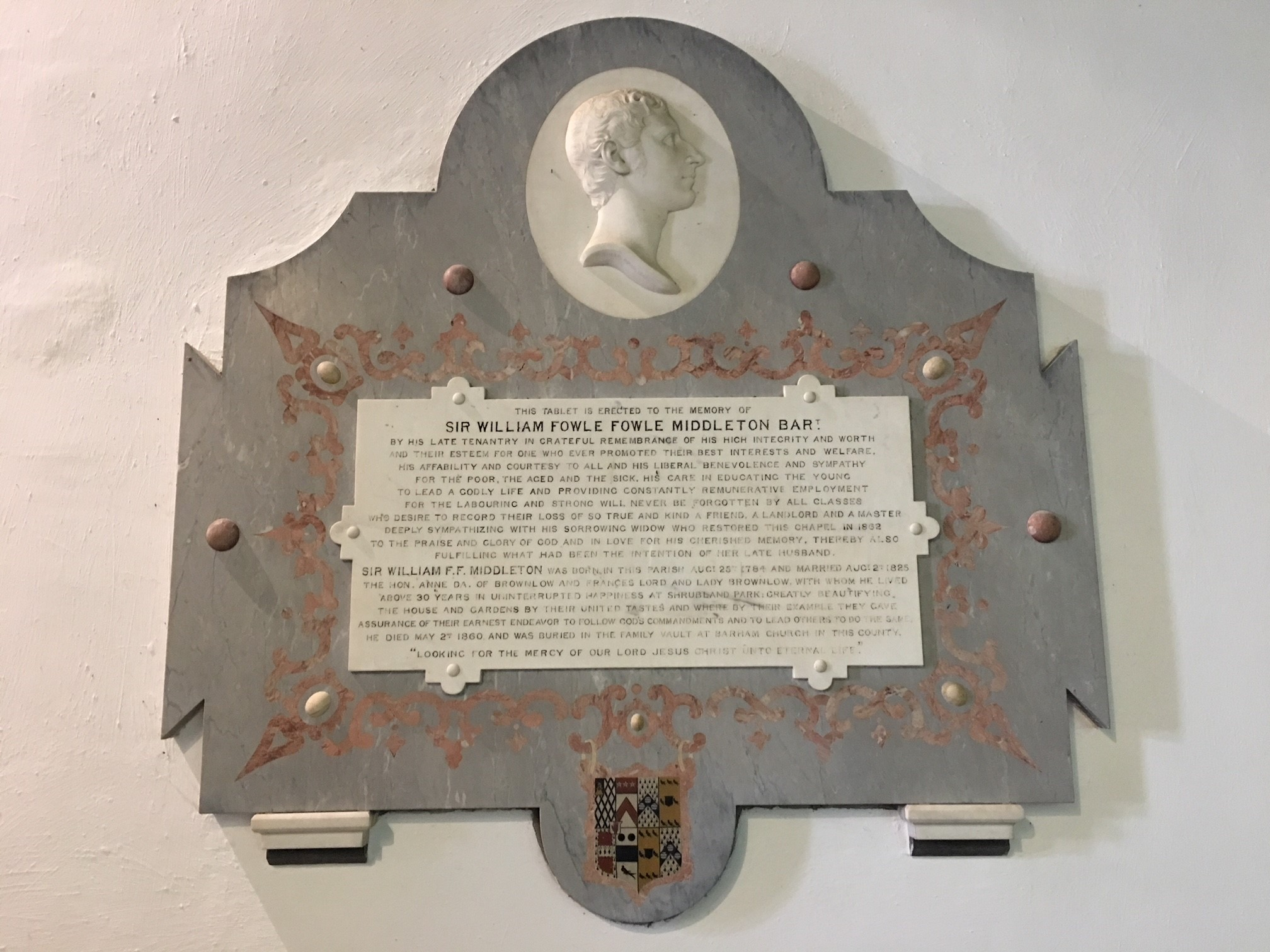
Memorial to Sir William Fowle Middleton, 2nd Baronet, in All Saints’ Church, Crowfield, Suffolk

After Sir William's death in 1860, the property passed to his cousin Sir George Nathaniel Broke Middleton, and from him in 1882 to his niece Jane Anne Broke, eldest daughter of Captain Charles Acton Vere-Broke, and her husband James Saumarez, 4th Baron de Saumarez. The Hall was used as a convalescent home during the First World War and the Old Hall as a brigade HQ during the Second World War. In the 1960s, the 6th Baron de Saumarez established a health clinic in the property which continued in the time of the 7th Baron.

Shrubland Hall Health Clinic operated in the hall adjoining Shrubland Park Gardens until 2 April 2006, when the Shrubland estate, totalling some 1,300 acres (5.3 km^{2}), was put up for sale with an asking price of £23 million. Until then the Italian-style gardens which include Grade II listed features were open to the public as a visitor attraction.

In 2010, the estate was sold in 42 separate lots. As of 2012, the Hall itself was used as residential quarters for the private higher education establishment, the British Institute of Technology & E-commerce (BITE) but in 2014 was re-opened as a hotel. In 2015, the Hall was advertised for sale at an asking price of £6,500,000.

In July 2026, counter-terrorism police arrested twelve people, including three on suspicion of conspiracy to murder and eight under terrorism laws, over a suspected far-right threat against a four-day UK Ijtima event at the hall attended by about 15,000 people.
