= Dai Llewellyn =

Welsh socialite (1946–2009)

Sir Dai Llewellyn Bt
- Llewellyn at the Cardiff North election count in 2007
- Born: 2 April 1946; Aberdare, Glamorgan, Wales
- Died: 13 January 2009 (aged 62); Edenbridge, Kent, England
- Spouse: Vanessa Hubbard (m. 1980–1987)
- Children: 2, including Olivia Llewellyn
- Parents: Harry Llewellyn (father); Christine Saumarez (mother)

Sir David St Vincent "Dai" Llewellyn, 4th Baronet (2 April 1946 – 13 January 2009), was a Welsh socialite.

== Background ==
Llewellyn was born in Aberdare, the son of Sir Harry Llewellyn, 3rd Baronet, a 1952 Summer Olympics gold medallist showjumper, and the Hon Christine Saumarez, the daughter of the 5th Baron de Saumarez, from a family from Guernsey with British naval ties. Llewellyn's middle name, St Vincent, came from his great-grandfather James St Vincent Saumarez, 4th Baron de Saumarez, and originally commemorated the friendship between James Saumarez, 1st Baron de Saumarez, and John Jervis, 1st Earl of St Vincent.

== Personal history ==
Llewellyn grew up at the family homes of Gobion Manor and Llanfair Grange, both near Abergavenny, and was educated at Hawtreys Preparatory School and Eton College. He did not complete his time at Eton, being moved to Milton Abbey School. He then attended Aix-en-Provence University in southern France, and worked as a travel agent, journalist, male model and as the social secretary of the Clermont Club and the Dorchester club.

Llewellyn was a Knight of the Order of Saint Lazarus (statuted 1910), a humanitarian charity, and in 1992 drove relief convoys in Yugoslavia.

A supporter of the United Kingdom Independence Party, he stood in the 2007 National Assembly for Wales election, as a candidate for the party in Cardiff North, where he came last and polled 3.7% of the vote. Llewellyn's opposition to the compulsory teaching of Welsh and his support for UKIP were met with criticism in Wales. Following this, he relocated permanently to Mayfair, London.

== Private life ==
Llewellyn married Vanessa Mary Theresa Hubbard in 1980. She was the daughter of Lady Miriam Fitzalan-Howard and Lt-Cdr Peregrine Hubbard and a niece of the 17th Duke of Norfolk. They had two daughters, actress Olivia Llewellyn (b. 1982) and Arabella (b. 1983). Llewellyn was often described as a 'party animal' and was known for his flamboyant social life.

Some people may call being a playboy a useless occupation, but I'm not so sure. I've not only had fun myself, but there has been fun for many others.

Known for his social lifestyle, he frequently attended London's private clubs, earning the nickname 'Conquistador of the Canapé Circuit'. Journalist Peter McKay recounted that Llewellyn jokingly claimed to have left his secretary tied up in the bath. The couple divorced after seven years in 1987, and Vanessa then married John Anstruther-Gough-Calthorpe; one of her children from this marriage is the actress Gabriella Wilde. In 1999, Llewellyn inherited the Llewellyn baronetcy upon the death of his father, along with a home in Aberbeeg, near Abertillery.

His younger brother, Roddy Llewellyn, is a British landscape gardener and gardening journalist, who was at one time romantically involved with Princess Margaret. Llewellyn's relationship with his brother Roddy deteriorated after he published an account of Roddy's relationship with Princess Margaret. Although Llewellyn later apologized, tensions remained, particularly regarding comments about his fiancée, Christel Jurgenson. The brothers fell out, with many of their comments aired in the tabloid press. In 2008, on the news of Llewellyn's failing health, the brothers finally reconciled.

Llewellyn died of bone cancer, having previously been diagnosed with prostate cancer, cirrhosis of the liver, and severe anaemia. His last affair was with a widow and old friend, Ingrid Seward, who was with him when he died, aged 62, on 13 January 2009, at Edenbridge and District War Memorial Hospital in Kent. His funeral was held at St Mary's Church, Coddenham, near Ipswich.

Baronetage of the United Kingdom
Preceded by Harry Llewellyn	Baronet (of Bwlffa); 1999–2009	Succeeded by Roddy Llewellyn
