= Broke (book) =

2010 book by Glenn Beck

Broke: The Plan to Restore Our Trust, Truth, and Treasure
- Author: Glenn Beck
- Illustrator: Paul E. Nunn
- Language: English
- Subject: U.S. politics
- Genre: Political non-fiction
- Publisher: Simon & Schuster
- Publication date: October 2010
- Publication place: United States
- Pages: 406
- ISBN: 978-1-4391-8719-7

Broke: The Plan to Restore Our Trust, Truth, and Treasure (also known as Broke) is a book by Glenn Beck released in October 2010.

== Background ==
In November 2009, Beck announced a non-fiction book called "The Plan", which, according to Beck, would "provide specific policies, principles and, most importantly, action steps that each of us can take to play a role" in a "Refounding". Beck originally planned to unveil the book during the Restoring Honor rally on August 28, 2010 at the feet of the Lincoln Memorial, but he canceled the unveiling soon after, opting to make the rally focus on faith and patriotism. The planned book was later renamed to its current title, and was released on October 26, 2010.

== Contents ==
Broke is divided into three parts. The first part discusses the history of how the United States got "broken", the second part outlines Beck's theories of a government takeover, and the third part consists of Beck's solution to the problem.

== Reception ==
Upon its release, Broke took the number two spot on The New York Times Best Seller list.

The New York Review of Books said that the book "is a "sober... libertarian tract [in which... t]here is a call for minimal government, more federalism, a flat tax, balanced budget and term-limit amendments, stemming the growth of Social Security, and Medicare payments, and serious cuts in defense spending."
