= Eric Saumarez, 7th Baron de Saumarez =

British peer (born 1956)

The Right Honourable The Lord de Saumarez
- Born: Eric Douglas Saumarez; 13 August 1956 (age 69); Suffolk, England
- Education: Milton Abbey School
- Alma mater: University of Nottingham; Royal Agricultural University
- Spouse(s): Christine Elizabeth Halliday (m. 1982; div. 1990) Susan Hearn (after 1991)
- Children: 2
- Parent(s): James Saumarez, 6th Baron de Saumarez; Joan Beryl Charlton

Eric Douglas Saumarez, 7th Baron de Saumarez (Note: Saumarez is pronounced "Sommeray".) (born 13 August 1956), is a British hereditary peer.

== Early life ==
Born and brought up in Suffolk, Saumarez is the son of James Victor Broke Saumarez, 6th Baron de Saumarez, by his marriage to Joan Beryl Charlton. He was educated at Milton Abbey School in Dorset, the University of Nottingham, and the Royal Agricultural College, Cirencester.

== Career ==
In 1991, upon the death of his father, Saumarez succeeded to the title of Baron de Saumarez, of Guernsey, and was a member of the House of Lords until it was reformed by the House of Lords Act 1999. In 2003 he was living at the family estate of Shrubland Park, Coddenham, but sold it in 2006. He later settled on the island of Guernsey, where his family originated.

=== Historical context ===
Baron de Saumarez, of the Island of Guernsey, is a title in the Peerage of the United Kingdom created on 15 September 1831 for the naval commander Admiral Sir James Saumarez, 1st Baronet. He was succeeded by his eldest son. James, the second Baron, a clergyman, who was succeeded by his younger brother, John, the third Baron.

The ancestral family seat was at Le Guet, Castel, on the island of Guernsey, with a second seat from 1882 at Shrubland Park, near Ipswich, Suffolk. Shrubland Park was sold by the present Lord de Saumarez in 2006 after the death of his mother. The Saumarez Manor estate in Guernsey belongs to a senior line of the family from which the Barons de Saumarez are descended: Matthew de Sausmarez (1718–1778), father of the first baron, was the younger brother of John (1706–1774), of Sausmarez Manor.

== Personal life ==
He married, firstly, Christine Elizabeth Halliday, daughter of Bernard Neil Halliday, on 14 July 1982. Before their divorce in 1990, they had two children:

- Hon. Claire Saumarez (born 23 February 1984)
- Hon. Emily Saumarez (born 14 June 1985).

On 2 September 1991 Saumarez married secondly Susan Hearn, daughter of Joseph Hearn.

As he has no male issue, the heir presumptive to the barony is his younger twin brother, Hon. Victor Saumarez.

== Arms ==
Coat of arms of Eric Saumarez, 7th Baron de Saumarez
Crest A falcon displayed Proper. Escutcheon Argent on a chevron Gules between three leopards' faces Sable as many castles triple-towered Or. Supporters Dexter a unicorn tail between the legs Argent navally gorged Azure charged on the shoulder with a castle triple-towered Or sinister a greyhound Argent collared Gules rimmed Or charged on the shoulder with a wreath of laurel Vert encircling an anchor Sable. Motto In Deo Spero (I Hope In God)

== Notes ==
Peerage of the United Kingdom
Preceded by James Saumarez	Baron de Saumarez; 1991–present Member of the House of Lords (1991–1999)	Incumbent; Heir presumptive: Hon. Victor Saumarez
