= William Wollaston (Ipswich MP elected 1733) =

English lawyer and Whig politician

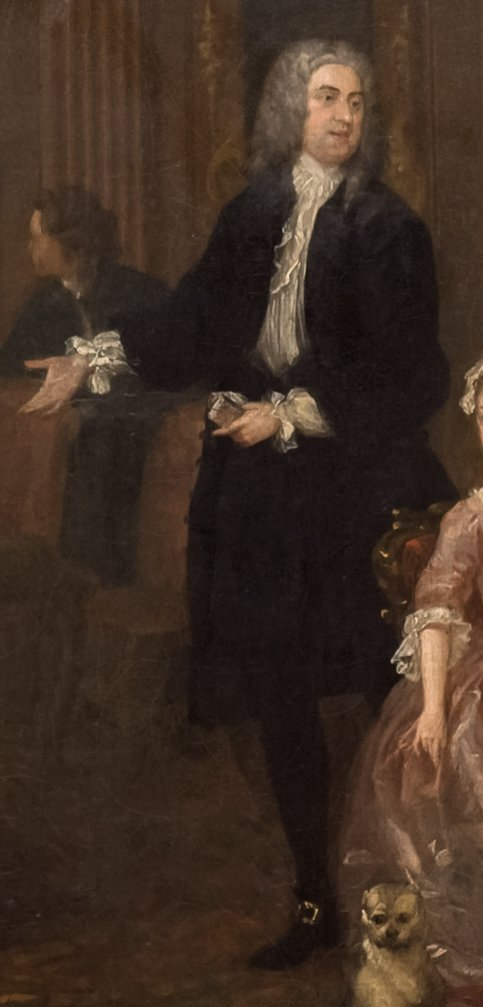
William Wollaston - from William Wollaston and his Family in a Grand Interior (1730) by William Hogarth

William Wollaston (26 April 1693 – 20 June 1757), of Finborough, Suffolk, was an English lawyer and Whig politician who sat in the House of Commons from 1733 to 1741.

== Early life ==
Wollaston was the second son of Revd William Wollaston (1659–1724), of Shenton, Leicestershire and Finborough, Suffolk, the philosopher, and his wife Catherine Charlton, daughter of Nicholas Charlton, citizen and draper of London. He was admitted at Inner Temple in 1709 and at Sidney Sussex College, Cambridge on 25 April 1710, subsequently migrating to King's College, Cambridge. He was awarded BA at Cambridge in 1714 and was called to the bar in 1715. He married Elizabeth Fauquier, daughter of John Francis Fauquier, deputy master of the mint and director of the Bank of England, in 1728. In 1729, he inherited the manor of Finborough from his elder brother.

== Career ==
Wollaston was returned unopposed as Member of Parliament for Ipswich at a by-election on 29 January 1733. He became a trustee of the Georgia Society in March 1734. At the 1734 British general election, he was re-elected MP for Ipswich after a contest. He voted with the Government. In February 1739, a petition for a parliamentary grant for Georgia came before the House, but he unexpectedly rose from his seat and left. He voted with the Government on the Spanish convention in 1739, but was absent from the vote on the place bill in 1740. He did not stand at the 1741 British general election.

== Death and legacy ==
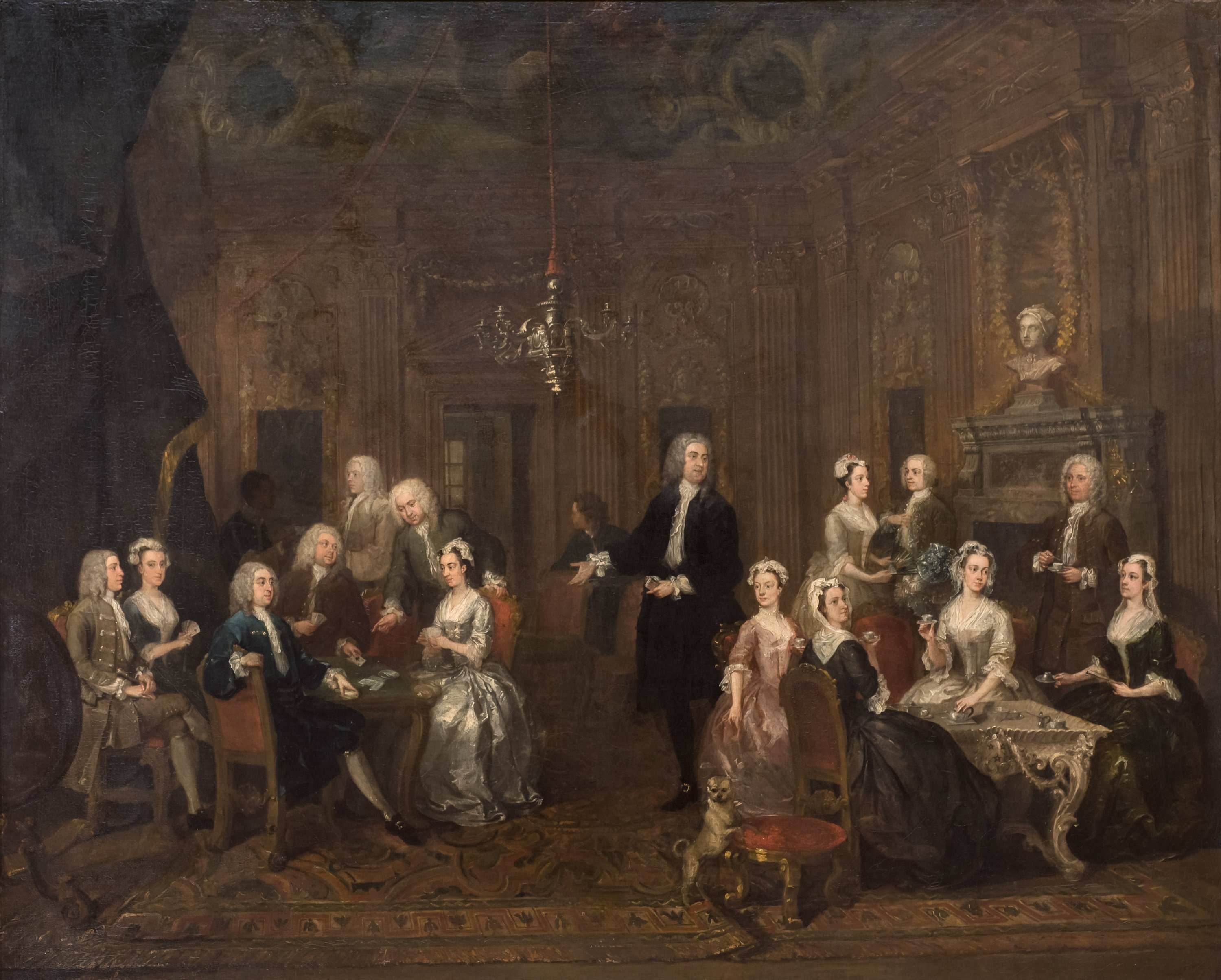
William Wollaston and his Family in a Grand Interior (1730) by William Hogarth

Wollaston died on 20 June 1757. He and his wife had five sons and three daughters. Their son, William Wollaston was also MP for Ipswich. Frederick (1735–1801), the third son, was a churchman, prebendary of Peterborough Cathedral, and father of Charles Wollaston R.N. Catherine, a daughter, married Edward Bourchier, who became vicar of All Saints' Church, Hertford, and rector of Bramfield.

Wollaston is the central figure in the 1730 William Hogarth painting William Wollaston and his Family in a Grand Interior, now in the New Walk Museum and Art Gallery, Leicester. Although it had been on loan to the museum since 1943, it was only acquired by them from the Wollaston family in 2019, via the Acceptance in Lieu scheme.

Parliament of Great Britain
Preceded by Francis Negus; Philip Broke	Member of Parliament for Ipswich; 1733–1734; With: Philip Broke	Succeeded by Edward Vernon; Samuel Kent
