= Broke Hall =

Country house in Nacton, Suffolk, England

Coordinates: 52.0054°N 1.2391°E

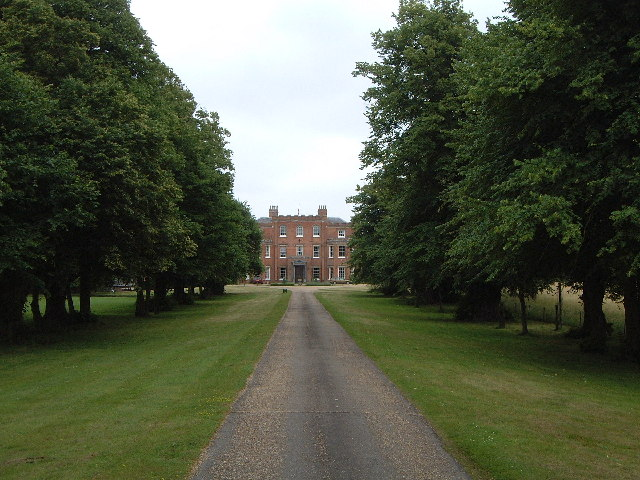
Avenue of lime trees leading to Broke Hall

Broke Hall /ˈbrʊk/ is an English country house at Nacton, near Ipswich, Suffolk. It overlooks the River Orwell, opposite Pin Mill. The gardens were landscaped by Humphry Repton in 1794, and the house is Grade II* listed.

The site was purchased by Sir Richard Broke, who built a manor house there, during the reign of Henry VIII. The present house was built by James Wyatt for Philip Bowes Broke in 1792, but is probably a remodelling of an earlier house built in 1775 by Richard Norris.

Broke Hall was the birthplace of Admiral Philip Bowes Vere Broke.

The property remained in the Broke family until 1887, when on the death of Admiral Sir George Broke-Middleton, it was inherited by his niece, Lady de Saumarez, formerly Jane Anne Broke, the wife of James Saumarez, 4th Baron de Saumarez, thus passing into the Saumarez family.

A primary school in Ipswich is named after the hall.
