= Harry Llewellyn =

British equestrian (1911–1999)

Sir Harry Llewellyn Bt CBE JP DL
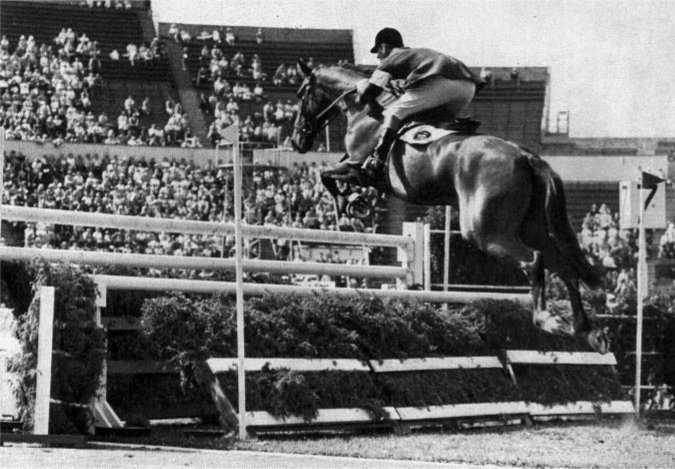
- Harry Llewellyn and Foxhunter at the 1952 Summer Olympics in Helsinki.
- Born: Henry Morton Llewellyn; 18 July 1911; Aberdare, Rhondda Cynon Taf, Wales
- Died: 15 November 1999 (aged 88); Abergavenny, Monmouthshire, Wales
- Education: Trinity College, Cambridge (M.A., 1937)
- Spouse: Hon. Christine Saumarez (m. 1944; died 1998)
- Children: 3, including David and Roderic
- Father: David Llewellyn
- Relatives: Rhys Llewellyn (brother); David Llewellyn (brother); James Saumarez, 5th Baron de Saumarez (father-in-law)
- Military career
- Allegiance: United Kingdom
- Branch: British Army
- Service years: 1939–1945
- Rank: Lieutenant colonel
- Unit: Warwickshire Yeomanry
- Conflicts: Second World War
- Awards: Legion of Merit

Sir Henry Morton Llewellyn, 3rd Baronet (18 July 1911 – 15 November 1999), was a British equestrian champion.

== Early life and education ==
Llewellyn was born in 1911, the second son of a colliery owner, Sir David Llewellyn, 1st Baronet. He was second in line to inherit the baronetcy on the death of his father.

He was educated at Oundle School and at Trinity College, Cambridge, before going into the army.

Llewellyn inherited the baronetcy on the death of his older brother, Sir Rhys Llewellyn, 2nd Baronet, in 1978. His younger brother Sir David Llewellyn was a Conservative politician.

== Early career ==
Llewellyn achieved some success as a show-jumping champion during the 1930s, and competed in the Grand National steeplechase, coming second in 1936.

== World War II ==
During World War II Llewellyn saw action in Italy and after D Day in Normandy and served as a liaison officer to Field Marshal Montgomery, eventually rising to the rank of lieutenant colonel in the British Army.

== Olympic gold medal ==
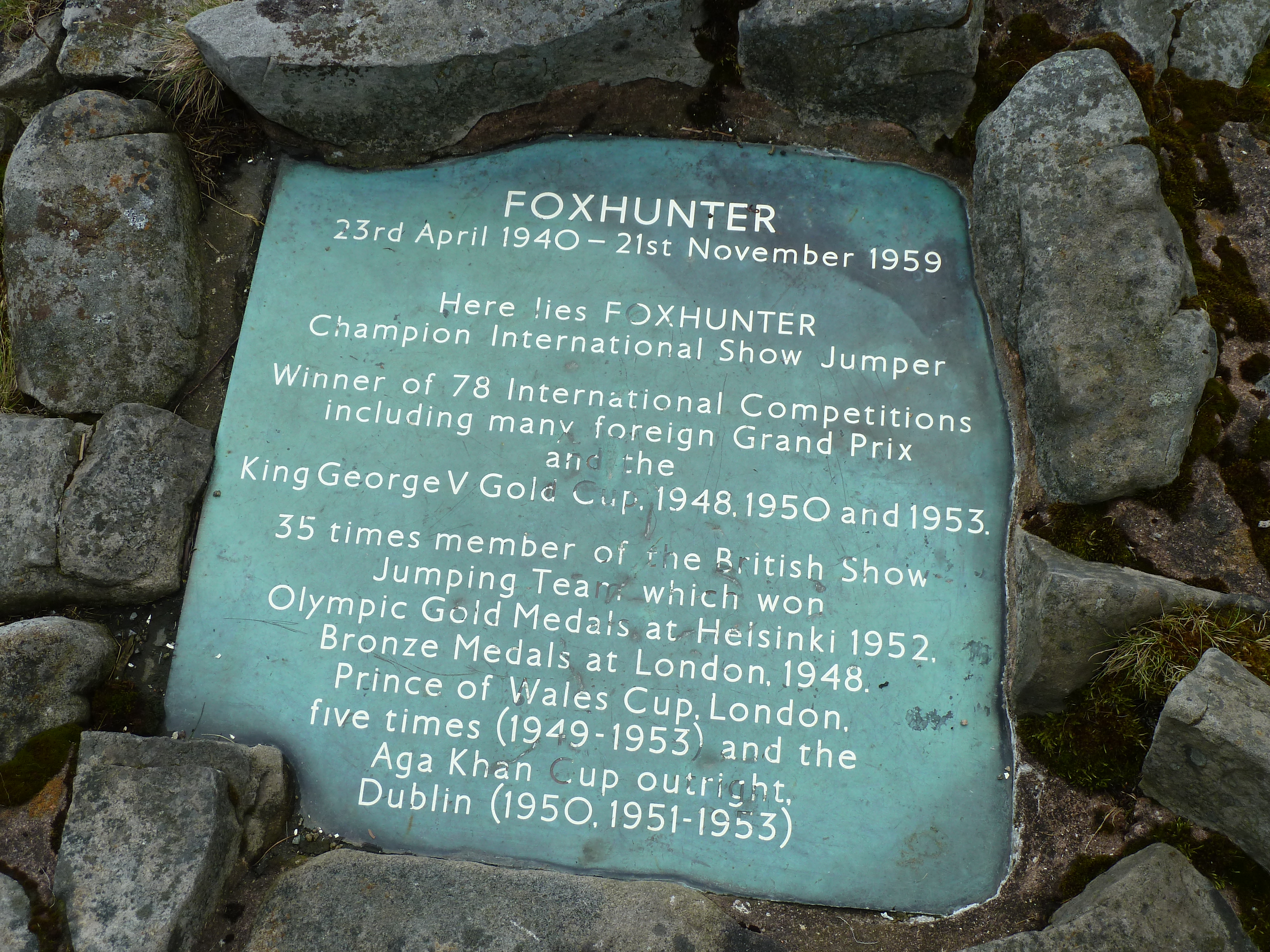
Foxhunter's grave marker around which Llewellyn's ashes were scattered

Olympic medal record

Equestrian

Representing United Kingdom
Gold medal – first place	1952 Helsinki	Team jumping
Bronze medal – third place	1948 London	Team jumping

After the war he concentrated on show jumping, buying Foxhunter in 1947 after a long search. The duo were part of the British team that competed in the team event at the 1948 Summer Olympics, winning the bronze medal. They captured the public imagination for their role in winning Great Britain's only gold medal at the 1952 Summer Olympics, in the team jumping equestrian event.

Foxhunter and Llewellyn won 78 international competitions during their joint career. Llewellyn later served widely in the administration of British show jumping, and was knighted in 1977 before inheriting the Llewellyn baronetcy upon the death of his brother. His business activities, following the nationalisation of the coal industry in 1947, included interests in brewing and television. Following the 1952 Olympic win he set up a chain of cafes called Foxhunter.

In 1990 he was inducted into the Welsh Sports Hall of Fame.

== Honours ==
Llewellyn was appointed Officer of the Order of the British Empire (OBE) in 1945 and Commander (CBE) in 1953 for services to British International Show Jumping.

== Marriage and children ==
Llewellyn lived at Llanfair Grange near Abergavenny in Monmouthshire. He married the Hon. Christine Saumarez, a daughter of James Saumarez, 5th Baron de Saumarez, on 15 April 1944. They had three children:

- Sir David St Vincent "Dai" Llewellyn, 4th Baronet (2 April 1946 – 13 January 2009)
- Sir Roderic Victor "Roddy" Llewellyn, 5th Baronet (born 9 October 1947)
- Anna Christina Llewellyn (born 29 May 1956)

== Death ==
Llewellyn died on 15 November 1999 at the age of 88. He was succeeded in the baronetcy by his elder son, Dai. His ashes were scattered near Foxhunter's grave and memorial on the Blorenge mountain above Abergavenny.

== Sources ==
- databaseOlympics.com
- Kidd, Charles; Williamson, David, eds. (1990). Debrett's Peerage and Baronetage (1990 ed.). New York: St Martin's Press.

Baronetage of the United Kingdom
Preceded by Rhys Llewellyn	Baronet of Bwllfa; 1978–1999	Succeeded by David Llewellyn
