= Foxhunter =

Show jumping stallion

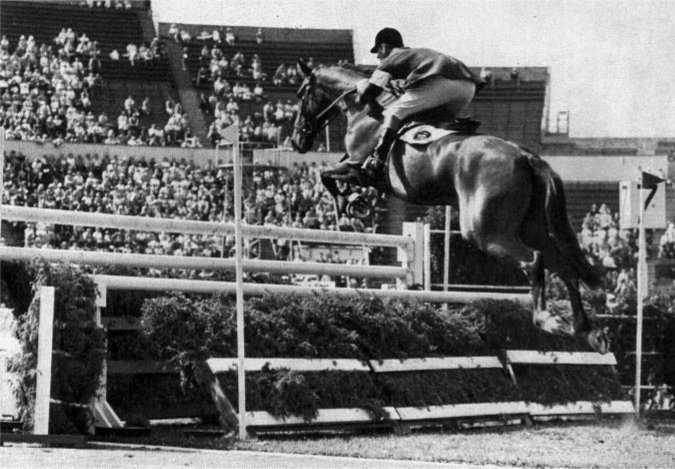
- Llewellyn-Foxhunter
- Sire: Erehwemos (Thoroughbred)
- Grandsire: Bethlehem (Thoroughbred)
- Dam: Catcall
- Maternal grandsire: Step Forward (Thoroughbred)
- Sex: Gelding
- Foaled: 23 April 1940
- Died: 21 November 1959 (aged 19)
- Country: Great Britain
- Colour: Bay

Foxhunter (1940–1959) was a champion show jumping horse ridden by Harry Llewellyn, best known for their part in securing Great Britain's only gold medal at the 1952 Summer Olympics (in the Team Jumping equestrian event).

They also were part of the British Show Jumping Team at the 1948 Summer Olympics, winning the bronze medal, and at many other international events.

Foxhunter and Llewellyn are the only horse and rider to win the King George V Gold Cup three times (in 1948, 1950, and 1953), and won 78 international competitions during their joint career.

Llewellyn bought Foxhunter, a golden-bay gelding, in 1947 following a search that began by studying the records of every registered showjumper on file with the British Show Jumping Association. The horse, who stood 16.3 hands (67 inches, 170 cm) high, was sired by the Thoroughbred stallion Erehwemos out of the half-bred mare Catcall.

== Death and legacy ==
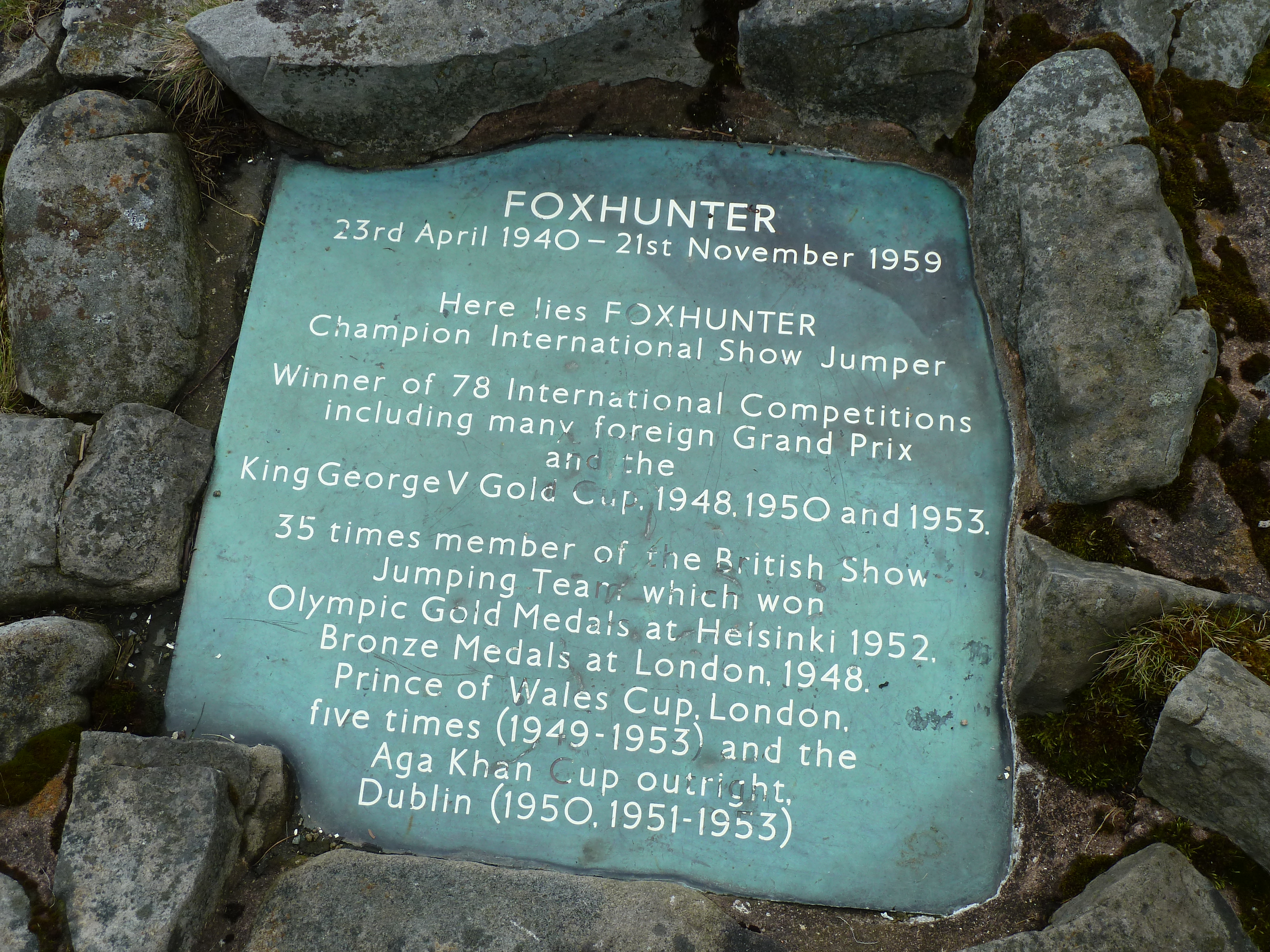
Plaque marking the grave of Foxhunter

Foxhunter died in 1959. His skeleton was preserved and donated to the Royal Veterinary College, where it was put on permanent display in the college's Anatomy Museum.

Foxhunter's hide was buried on the Blorenge mountain, between Abergavenny and Blaenavon. A memorial plaque listing Foxhunter's achievements marks the Blorenge site and a car park is situated nearby. When Sir Harry died in 1999 his ashes were scattered around the horse's memorial.

The Foxhunter Championship for novice horses at the annual Horse of the Year Show was named after Foxhunter, and was first held in 1954.
