= Roddy Llewellyn =

British baronet

Sir Roddy Llewellyn Bt
- Born: Roderic Victor Llewellyn; 9 October 1947 (age 79); Crickhowell, Brecknockshire, Wales
- Title: 5th Llewellyn Baronet
- Predecessor: Dai Llewellyn
- Spouse: Tatiana Soskin (m. 1981)
- Children: 3
- Parents: Sir Harry Llewellyn, 3rd Bt. (father); The Hon. Christine Saumarez (mother)

Sir Roderic Victor Llewellyn, 5th Baronet (born 9 October 1947), is a British baronet, garden designer, journalist, author, and television presenter. He had an eight-year relationship with Princess Margaret, Countess of Snowdon, the younger sister of Queen Elizabeth II.

== Early life and education ==
Llewellyn was born in Crickhowell, Brecknockshire, the younger son of Sir Harry Llewellyn, 3rd Bt., an Olympic gold medallist in show jumping, and his wife, Christine Saumarez (d. 1998). He was educated at Shrewsbury School and then received a National Certificate in Horticulture at Merrist Wood College. In 2009, he succeeded his elder brother, Dai, to the Llewellyn baronetcy.

Aged 7, he was sent to Hawtreys, a boarding school.

== Personal life ==
Beginning in 1973, Llewellyn, then aged 25, began an affair with Princess Margaret, then 43. They had met in Scotland at the Café Royal in Edinburgh in September 1973. Margaret's biographer Theo Aronson made this comment some years later, "He was well-mannered, well-spoken, and amusing; above all, he was very sweet-natured."

In 1976, photographs of the couple in Mustique led to a scandal. In the tabloids, he was referred to as her "toy boy". Llewellyn issued a public statement which said, "I much regret any embarrassment caused to Her Majesty the Queen and the royal family, for whom I wish to express the greatest respect, admiration and loyalty".

The much publicised eight-year relationship was a factor in the dissolution of the princess's marriage to the Earl of Snowdon.

According to Anne Tennant, Baroness Glenconner, quoted in the 2018 documentary Elizabeth: Our Queen, the monarch discussed Llewellyn with her after Princess Margaret's funeral in 2002. She offered Lady Glenconner thanks for having introduced her sister to him because "he made her really happy".

On 11 July 1981, Llewellyn married Tatiana Soskin, a daughter of film producer Paul Soskin. The couple have three daughters.

== Career ==
=== Gardening ===
Llewellyn has said, "I have always been fascinated by plants...They give me an enormous amount of solace."

It was apparently his nanny, Rebecca Jenkins, who introduced him to gardening. When the family removed to Llanfair Grange, Llewellyn said, "we had huge lawns and wonderful views. It was pretty country...it had a big vegetable garden and fabulous trees." Llewellyn runs his own company, Roddy Llewellyn's Garden Design.

He regularly lectures, appearing at venues including the Retirement Show at Olympia, Glasgow and Manchester (chairing question and answer sessions), Dobbies Garden Centre ("Inspirational Ideas for the Garden"), Hereford Cathedral ("Interesting Ideas for the Garden"), Malvern Spring Gardening Show ("Who are better Gardeners – Men or Women?"), Cotswold Wildlife Park (series, "An Evening with the Gardening Experts 2005–2006"), Cholmondeley Castle ("Amusing Ideas for the Garden"), and the ship the Crystal Symphony (on a garden design theme cruise giving "themed lectures").

His published books include Town Gardens, Beautiful Backyards, Water Gardens: The Connoisseur's Choice, Elegance & Eccentricity, Growing Gifts, Grow It Yourself: Gardening with a Physical Disability and Roddy Llewellyn's Gardening Year.

Llewellyn was a patron at the Southport Flower Show.

=== Journalism and broadcasting ===
Llewellyn has written books, magazine articles, and newspaper columns on the subject of gardening. The magazines he has written for have included Heritage Homes in 2006, Country Life in 2005 and 2006, Country Illustrated in 2004 and 2006, Oxfordshire Limited Edition in 2006, The Lady in 2005, Eden Project Friends in 2004, and The Sunday Times in 2004. He wrote columns for the Daily Star from 1981 to 1985, and The Mail on Sunday from 1987 to 1999.

He presented The Home Show in 1990 and The Gardening Roadshow in 1992–93 for Thames Television, amongst several other programmes. He appeared on Gardeners' World in 2007.

Llewellyn was also Gardening Correspondent for The Mail on Sunday for 12 years.

=== Music ===
Llewellyn released a pop music album of standards in 1978, "Roddy", but found that the news media was interested only in his personal life. The album achieved little success.

=== Heraldry ===
Llewellyn served as an assistant herald at the College of Arms and was noted as "liking to trace ancestries".

== In popular culture ==
Llewellyn is portrayed by Simon Woods in the 2005 film The Queen's Sister, and by Harry Treadaway in the Netflix series The Crown.

== Bibliography ==
- Llewellyn, Roddy (1986). Beautiful Backyards.
- Llewellyn, Roddy. Elegance & Eccentricity. 1989.
- Llewellyn, Roddy. Gardening in your face!. 1990.
- Llewellyn, Roddy. Grow It Yourself. Gardening with a Physical Disability. 1993.
- Llewellyn, Roddy. Growing Gifts. 1991.
- Llewellyn, Roddy. Roddy Llewellyn's Gardening Year. 1997.
- Llewellyn, Roddy. Town Gardens. 1981.
- Llewellyn, Roddy. Water Gardens: The Connoisseur's Choice. 1987.

Baronetage of the United Kingdom
Preceded by Dai Llewellyn	Baronet (of Bwlffa); 2009–present	Incumbent
