= Philip Broke =

Royal Navy officer (1776–1841)

Rear-Admiral of the Red Sir Philip Broke Bt KCB
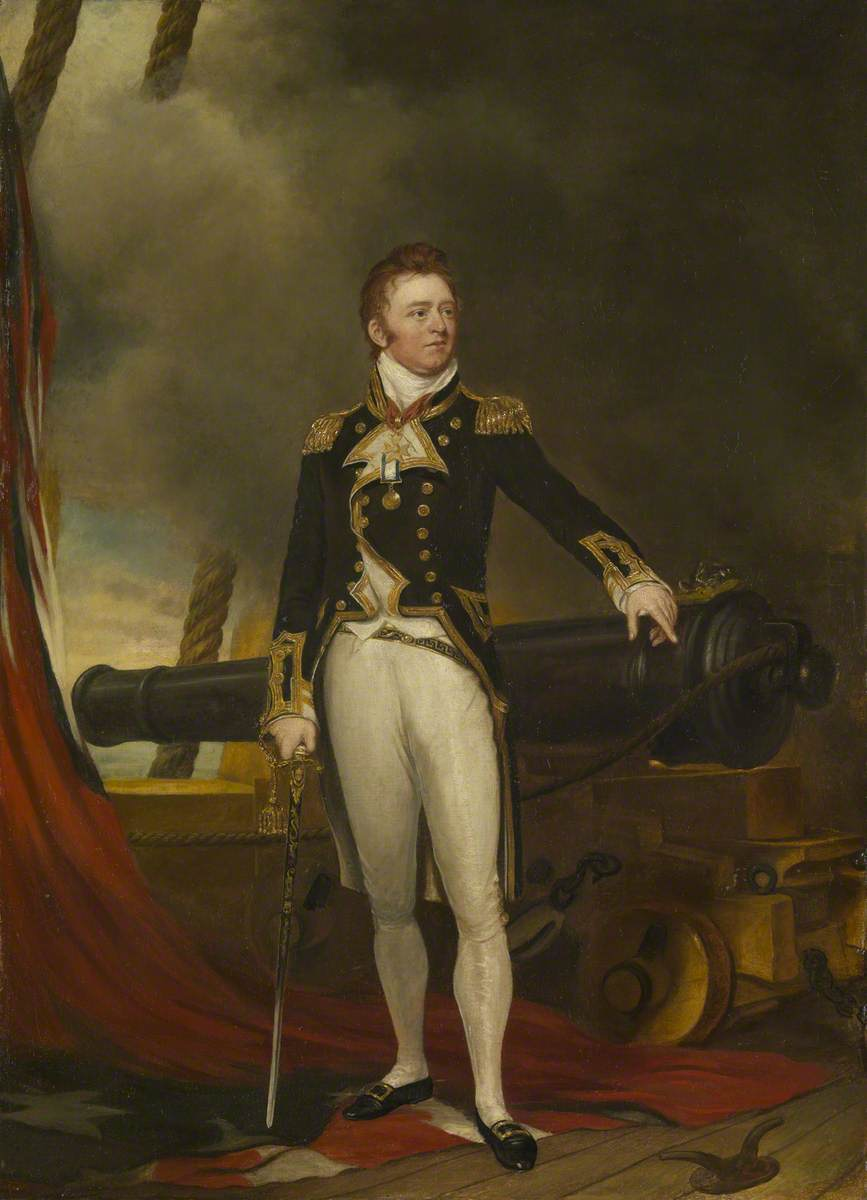
- Portrait by Samuel Lane, c. 1813–1841
- Born: 9 September 1776; Broke Hall, Nacton
- Died: 2 January 1841 (aged 64); London, England
- Spouse: Sarah Louisa Middleton
- Children: George Broke-Middleton
- Military career
- Allegiance: Great Britain; United Kingdom
- Branch: Royal Navy
- Service years: 1792–1841
- Rank: Rear-Admiral of the Red
- Conflicts: French Revolutionary Wars; Battle of Cape St. Vincent (1797); Napoleonic Wars; War of 1812; Capture of USS Chesapeake (WIA)
- Awards: Naval Gold Medal

Rear-Admiral of the Red Sir Philip Bowes Vere Broke, 1st Baronet, KCB (9 September 1776 – 2 January 1841) was a Royal Navy officer who served in the French Revolutionary and Napoleonic Wars and the War of 1812. During his lifetime, he was often referred to as "Broke of the Shannon", a reference to his notable command of HMS Shannon. Broke's most famous military achievement was defeating and capturing the USS Chesapeake in 1813.

== Early life ==
Broke was born at Broke Hall, Nacton, near Ipswich, the eldest son of Philip Bowes Broke, grandson of Philip Broke and descendant of Sir Richard Broke, who served as Chief Baron of the Exchequer. He was educated at Ipswich School, where a house was later named in his honour.

== Naval career ==
Broke joined the Royal Naval Academy at Portsmouth Dockyard in 1788, and began active service in the Royal Navy as a midshipman in 1792. It was rather unusual for him to receive formal naval education – most of his contemporaries had only "on the job" training. He served as third lieutenant on the frigate HMS Southampton during the Battle of Cape St. Vincent in February 1797. He was promoted to commander in 1799 and captain on 14 February 1801. On 25 November 1802, Broke married Sarah Louisa Middleton, daughter of Sir William Fowle Middleton 1st Baronet of Crowfield, Suffolk. They had 11 children, including Philip Broke, 2nd Baronet, George Broke-Middleton, and Charles Acton Broke.

=== Capture of USS Chesapeake ===
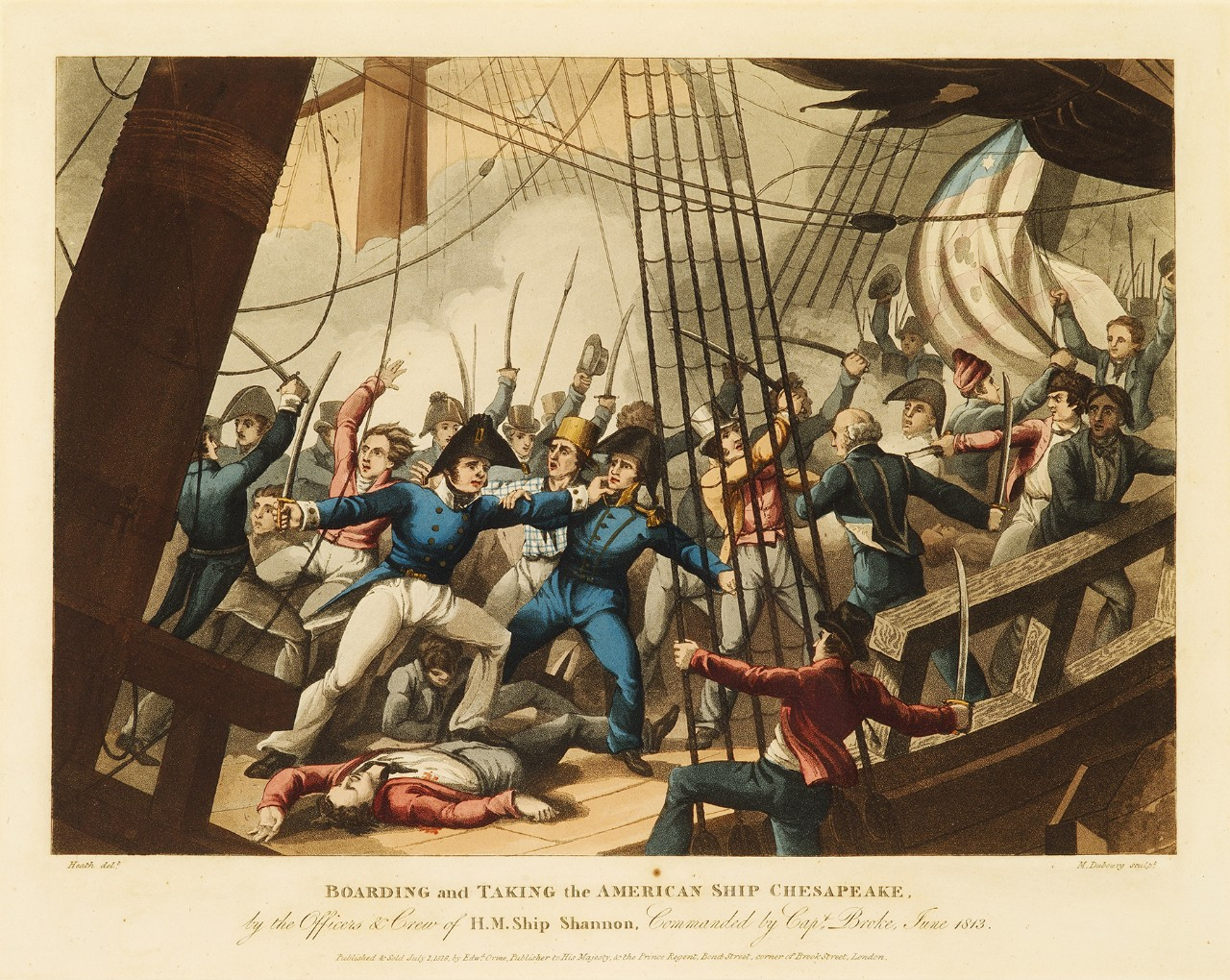
Illustration of the British boarding Chesapeake. Broke is inaccurately shown wearing a bicorne rather than a round hat.

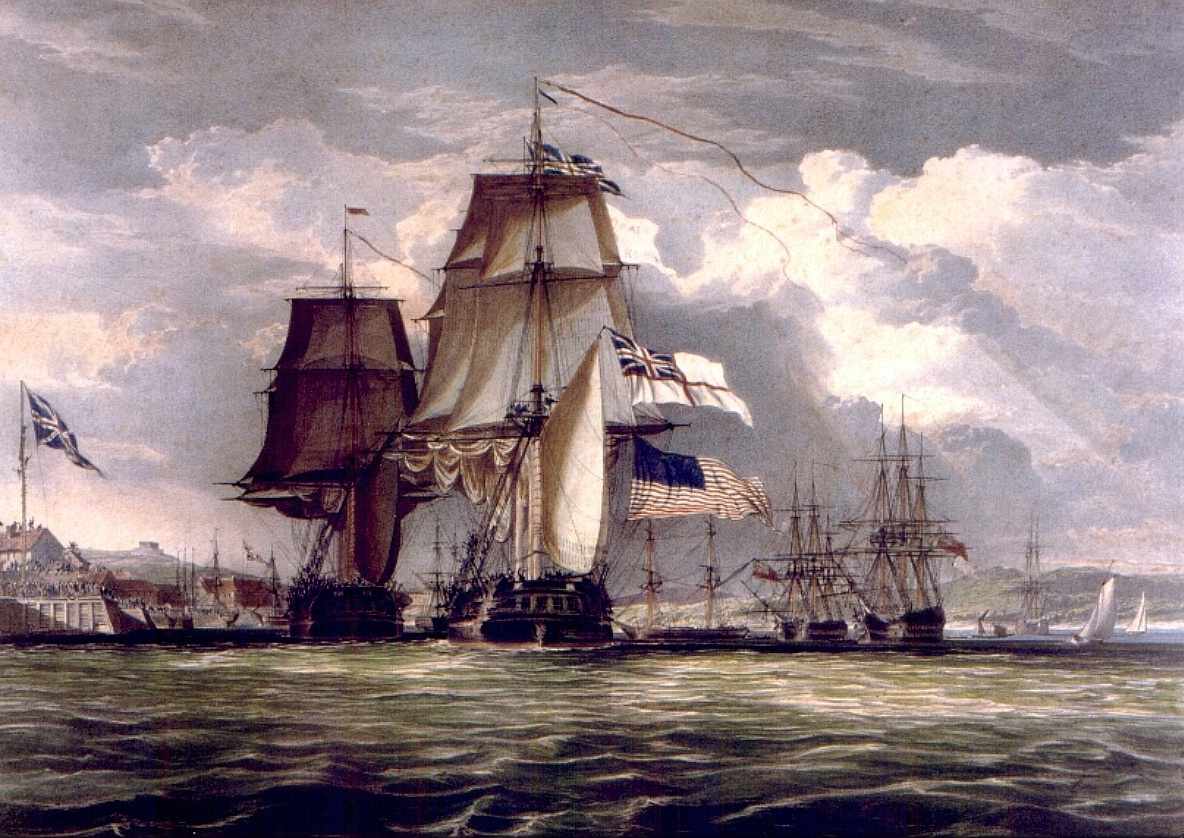
Painting of Shannon leading the captured Chesapeake into Halifax

Broke's most notable accomplishment was his victory over the USS Chesapeake while commanding HMS Shannon on 1 June 1813, during the War of 1812. Broke took command of Shannon, a 38-gun frigate, on 31 August 1806. He was ordered to sail to Halifax, Nova Scotia in 1811 as Anglo-American relations deteriorated. The US declared war on Britain on 18 June 1812. There were six naval encounters between British and American frigates in 1812 and the early months 1813. The Americans won every one of those six encounters, which came as a surprise to the Royal Navy. The British and American ships were of the same rate, yet they were not of the same size or power. In each case the American ships were larger than the British vessels, had larger crews and had a heavier broadside. The Americans had a main battery of 24-pounder long guns compared with the smaller 18-pounders mounted on the British ships; the weight refers to the size of the cannonballs.

Matters changed when Shannon met Chesapeake off Boston in a single ship action. Although Chesapeake was a slightly larger craft and had a substantially larger crew, the armament of the two ships was evenly matched. However, gunnery was Broke's area of expertise, and the crew of Shannon were exceptionally well drilled for the era. At the time the official rating of a ship did not accurately reflect the number of cannon mounted. Thus Shannon (1065 tons burthen) was classed as a 38 gun ship but mounted 48 guns in total. Chesapeake (1135 tons burthen) was variously rated a 36 or 38 gun ship but mounted 49 guns in total. Broke mounted a number of very small carronades in order that ships' boys and younger midshipmen could have cannon light enough for them to practise on. The force of a ship was usually calculated as "weight of metal". This was the aggregate of the weight of all the cannonballs capable of being fired in one broadside (i.e., when half of the cannon, all the guns on the same side, were fired). The British weight of metal was 547 pounds, the American weight of metal was 581 pounds. The two ships were very well matched with no preponderance of force on either side.

Chesapeake was disabled by gunfire, boarded and captured within 15 minutes of opening fire. 56 members of Chesapeake's crew were killed and 85 wounded, including her captain James Lawrence, who died of his wounds on 4 June. Lawrence's last command was reported to be, "Don't give up the ship". On Shannon, 24 were killed and 59 wounded, including Broke who sustained a serious head wound while leading the boarding party. The head wound from a cutlass blow, which had exposed his brain, had been very severe and accompanied by great loss of blood. Therapeutic bleeding, routinely employed at the time, was not performed by Shannon's surgeon Mr Alexander Jack, which was to Broke's advantage. The report of the surgeon described the wound as "a deep cut on the parietal bone, extending from the top of the head ... towards the left ear, [the bone] penetrated for at least three inches in length." Lieutenant Provo Wallis took command of Shannon as the frigate and her prize returned to Halifax as surgeons worked to save Broke. In Halifax, Broke recovered at the Commissioner's residence in the Halifax Naval Yard.

Shannon's victory was celebrated in Britain, while the Americans saw it as a humiliation. In recognition for his victory, Broke was created a baronet on 25 September 1813. He was appointed a Knight Commander of the Order of the Bath on 3 January 1815. Broke was also awarded a Naval Gold Medal, one of only eight awarded for single ship actions between 1794 and 1816. While his wounds precluded further active service, Broke served as a naval gunnery specialist in the Royal Navy, and was promoted to Rear-Admiral of the Red on 22 July 1830. He died on 2 January 1841 in London and was buried in Nacton; a church monument dedicated to him was sculpted by Thomas Denman.

== Arms ==
Coat of arms of Sir Philip Broke, Baronet
Crest Family crest: A brock (or badger) proper Augmented crest: Out of a naval crown Or a dexter arms embowed encircled with wreath of laurel proper grasping a trident Or Escutcheon Or a cross engrailed per pale Sable and Gules Motto SÆVUMQUE TRIDENTUM SERVAMUS (Latin for 'We always keep the trident') Orders Knight Commander of the Order of the Bath: TRIA JUNCTA IN UNO (Latin for 'Three joined in one'); ICH DIEN (German for 'I serve') Other elements Laurel wreath behind the shield indicate armiger is a recipient of the military division of the Order of the Bath Red Hand of Ulster baronet badge

Baronetage of the United Kingdom
New creation	Baronet (of Broke Hall); 1813–1841	Succeeded by Philip Broke
