= Richard Broke (judge) =

English judge

Sir Richard Broke
- Died: May or June 1529
- Occupation: Judge
- Years active: from before 1510, up to 1529
- Title: Chief Baron of the Exchequer
- Term: 1526–1529
- Successor: Sir Richard Lyster
- Children: 3 sons, 4 daughters

Sir Richard Broke or Brooke (died 1529), was an English judge, who served as Chief Baron of the Exchequer.

Broke was fourth son of Thomas Broke of Leighton in Cheshire, and his wife, daughter, and heiress of John Parker of Copnall. His ancestors had been Brokes of Leighton since the twelfth century, and came of a common stock with the Brookes of Norton. On 11 July 1510 he obtained a royal exemption from becoming serjeant-at-law, an honour then conferred only on barristers of at least sixteen years practice at the bar. Perhaps he was deterred, as others had been, by the great expenses attending the promotion; but he did not long avail himself of his privilege, he being one of the nine Serjeants appointed in the following November. He was double reader in his inn, the Middle Temple, in the autumn of 1510, and must have passed his first readership before 1502, at which date Dugdale's list of readers commences. In the spring of 1511, from undersheriff he became Recorder of London, an office he filled until 1520. Foss says he represented the city of London in the parliaments of 1511 and 1515, the returns of members to which parliaments are stated to be 'not found' in the House of Lords' Report. In the parliament of 1523 he was one of the triers of petitions. In June 1519 he appears as a junior justice of assize for the Norfolk circuit. He became a judge of the common pleas and knight in 1520, and chief baron of the exchequer on 24 January 1526, and continued in both offices till his death in May or June 1529.

As serjeant, and afterwards as judge, his name appears in many commissions for the home and Norfolk circuits. His will, dated 6 May 1529, was proved on 2 July 1529 by his widow, daughter of ___ Ledes, by whom he left three sons, Robert (afterwards of Nacton), William, and John, and four daughters, Bridget, Cicely, Elizabeth (married ___ Fouleshurst), and Margaret. Bridget had married George Fastolfe of Nacton, who died without issue in 1527, leaving his manors of Nacton, Cowhall, and Shullondhall, Suffolk, to her, with remainder to her father and his heirs, who thus became Brokes of Nacton. Margaret married William Whorwood, a prominent lawyer. Sir Richard left property in Norfolk, Kent, Surrey, and Sussex. A direct descendant, Robert Broke of Nacton, was created baronet in 1661, and died without male issue in 1693, when the estates passed to his nephew Robert, grandfather of Admiral Philip Bowes Vere Broke.

Legal offices
Preceded by John FitzJames	Chief Baron of the Exchequer; 1526–1529	Succeeded by Sir Richard Lyster
