= Nacton =

Village in Suffolk, England

Coordinates: 52.017°N 1.233°E

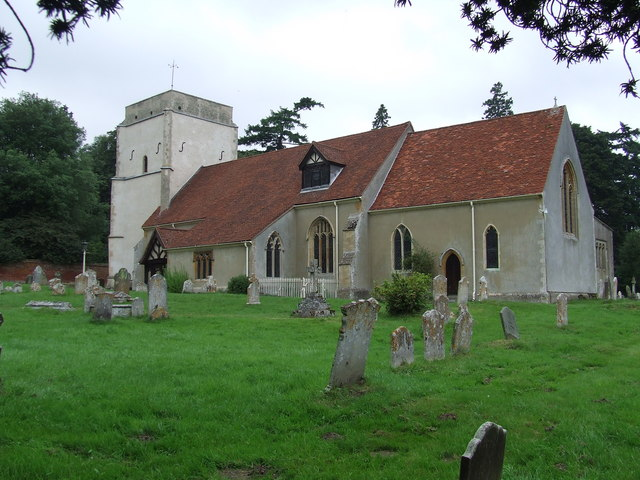
- St Martin's church, Nacton

- Location within Suffolk
- Population: 757 (2011)
- OS grid reference: TM220403
- District: East Suffolk
- Shire county: Suffolk
- Region: East
- Country: England
- Sovereign state: United Kingdom
- Post town: IPSWICH
- Postcode district: IP10
- Dialling code: 01473

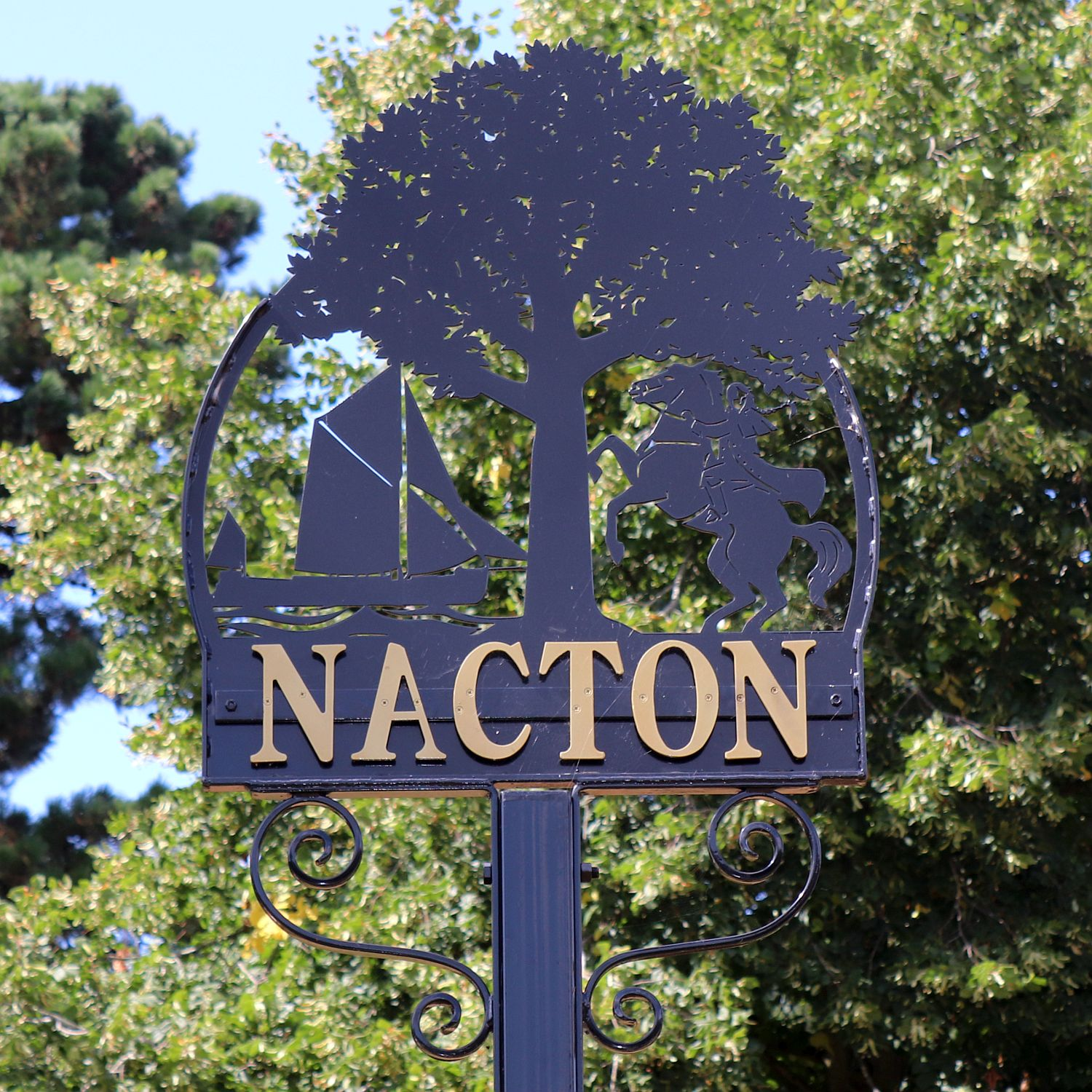
Nacton Village Sign

Nacton is a village and civil parish in the East Suffolk district of Suffolk, England. The parish is bounded by the neighbouring parishes of Levington to the east and Bucklesham to the north. It is located between the towns of Ipswich and Felixstowe.

Nacton abuts the River Orwell opposite the village of Pin Mill. Riverside features covered by this parish are (from east to west) Buttermans Bay, Potter's Point, Downham Reach, Mulberry Middle, and Pond Oose.

Nacton parish is the mother for the villages of Levington and Bucklesham and was chosen for the site of the Woodbridge poor-law union workhouse because of its central location. A substantial house has replaced the workhouse. This was used by Amberfield School as its main building until it closed in 2011. The more adventurous explorer can find the old burial ground opposite the entrance to a lane leading down to the school. The site of Alnesbourne Priory is close to Nacton.

The village contains one of the few remaining active wildfowl decoys in East Anglia.

== History ==
The name means Hnaki or Nokkvi's homestead. In 1010, Ulfcytel, Ealdorman of East Anglia, fought the Danes in the area now called Seven Hills (there were more than seven barrows at one time), which is now mostly under junction 58 of the A14.

A country house in the parish, Broke Hall, was the seat of the Broke family, including Admiral Sir Philip Broke.

A former public house, the Anchor, appears to have been closed in controversial circumstances during the late 19th century.

From 1877 to 1959, the village was served by the Orwell station.

== Notable inhabitants ==
- Margaret Catchpole became legendary in the 19th century after the publication of 'The History of Margaret Catchpole: A Suffolk Girl' by Richard Cobbold in 1845. It is a classic story of a young girl falling in love with a villain (a smuggler called Will Laud) and suffering the consequences.
- Edward Vernon, a naval hero.
- George Tomline, a politician

== Governance ==
An electoral ward in the same name exists. This ward stretches northeast to Waldringfield, and at the 2011 census, it had a population of 4,602.

== Orwell Park Observatory ==
An observatory, which had been commissioned at Orwell Park by Colonel George Tomline (1813–1889), has been in use as the base of the Orwell Astronomical Society, Ipswich (OASI), since the 1960s.

== In popular culture ==
Nacton's name was used as a word coined by Douglas Adams to describe the letter 'N' when inserted between two other words as an abbreviation for 'and', as in rock 'n' roll and fish 'n' chips.
