= Coddenham =

Village and civil parish in Suffolk, England

Coordinates: 52.145°N 1.119°E

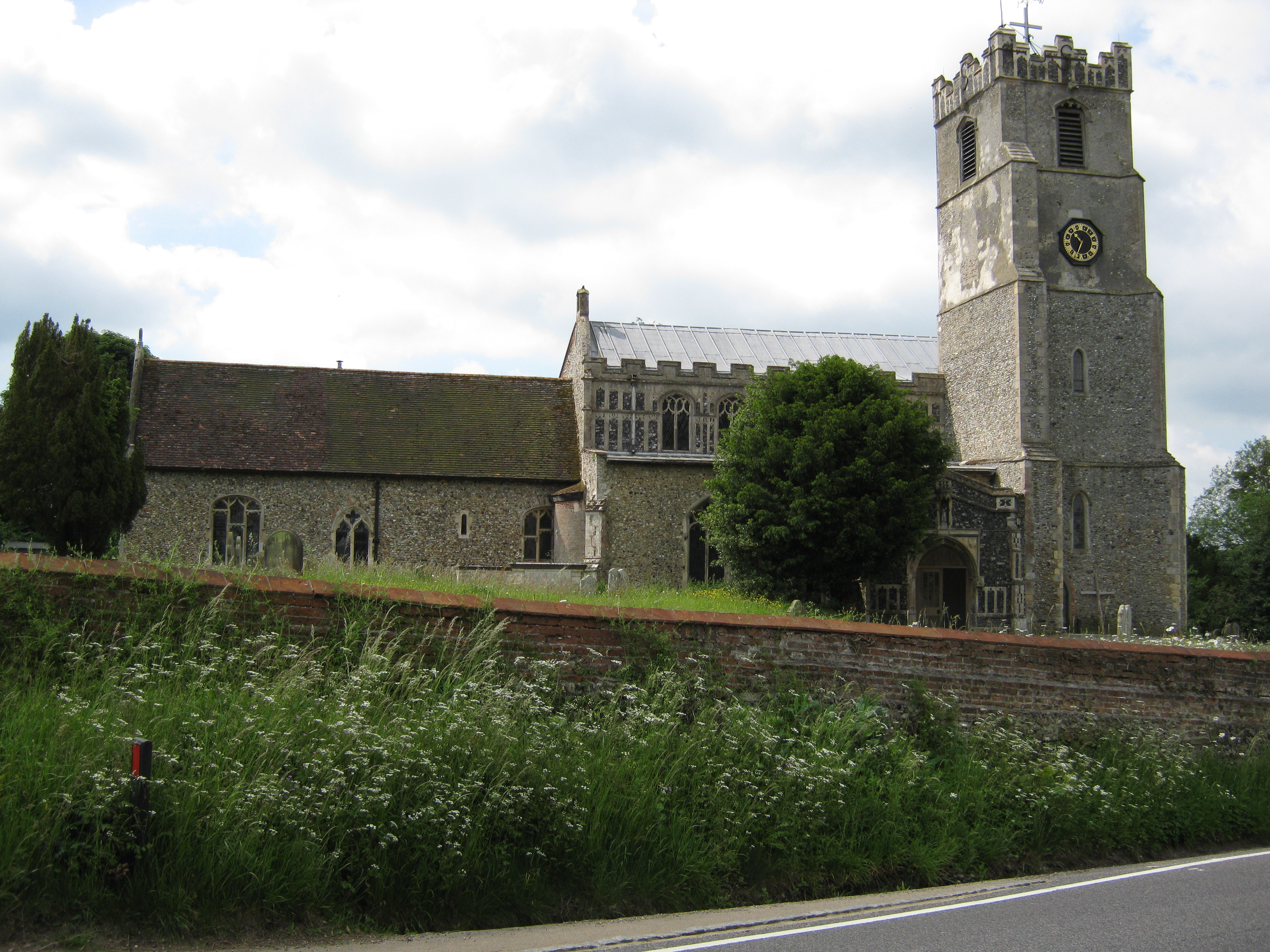
- Church of St Mary, Coddenham

- Location within Suffolk
- Population: 570 (2005); 620 (2011)
- District: Mid Suffolk
- Shire county: Suffolk
- Region: East
- Country: England
- Sovereign state: United Kingdom
- Post town: Ipswich
- Postcode district: IP6
- Police: Suffolk
- Fire: Suffolk
- Ambulance: East of England

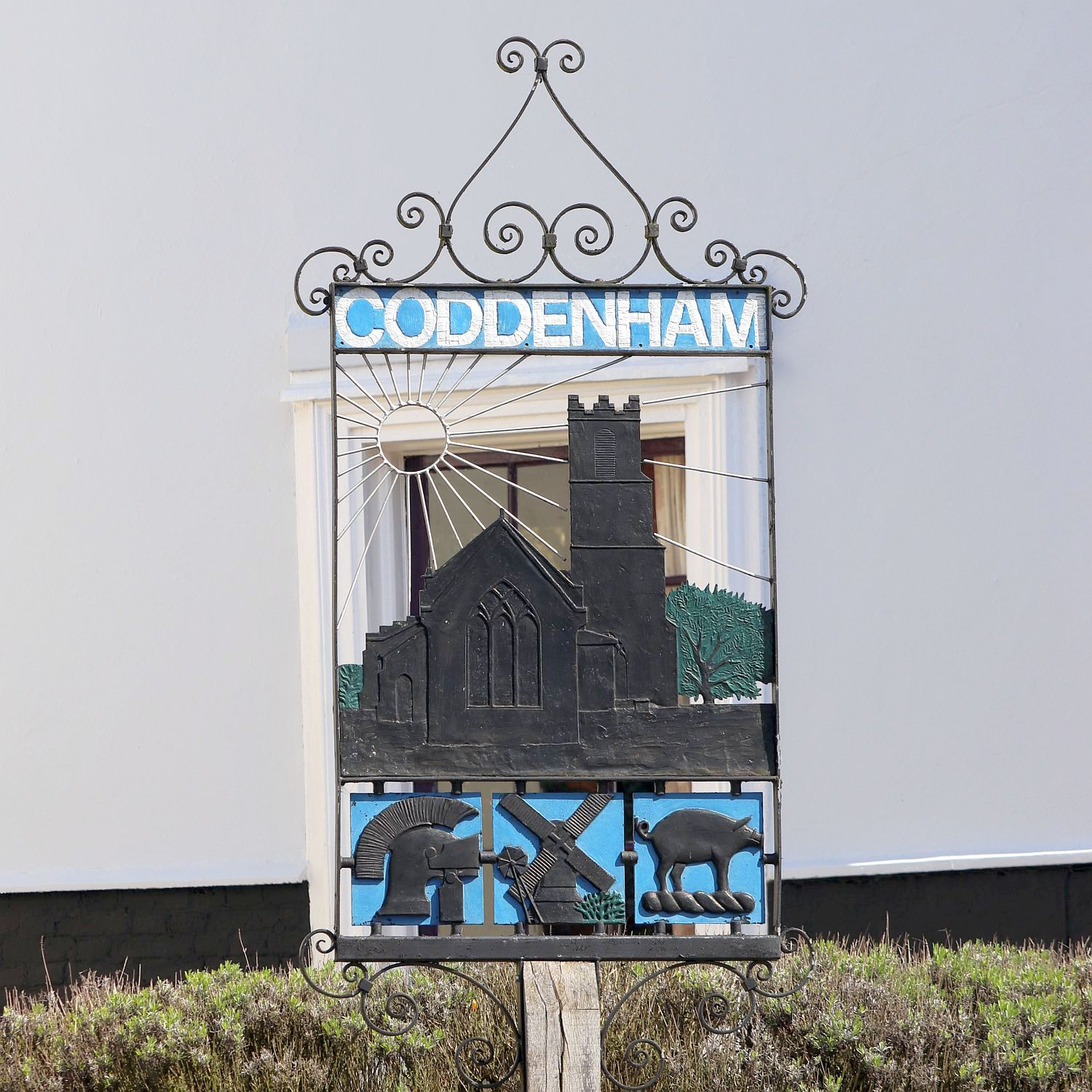
Coddenham Village Sign, Suffolk

Coddenham is a village and civil parish in the Mid Suffolk district of Suffolk in eastern England. Located to the north of the A14 road, 8 miles north of Ipswich, the parish also includes the hamlet of Coddenham Green. In 2005 its population was 570, increasing to 620 at the 2011 Census. At the 2021 census its population was 630. Village facilities include a community village shop and café, a country club offering themed evenings, darts, pool and snooker, and the Coddenham Centre.

== History ==
During the Roman occupation of Britain, Coddenham was the largest settlement in Suffolk. There were two Roman forts at the site at Baylham House, which was known as Combretovium. The Roman road from Colchester (then Camulodunum) to Caistor St Edmund (then Venta Icenorum) in Norfolk ran through the town.

The place-name 'Coddenham' is first attested in the Domesday Book of 1086, where it appears as Codenham. The name means 'Codda's homestead'.

The village was struck by an F1/T3 tornado on 23 November 1981, as part of the record-breaking nationwide tornado outbreak on that day.

== Notable people ==
The motocross racer Dave Bickers was from Coddenham.

The astronomer and author Tom Boles lives in Coddenham.
