= Sparks (name) =

Sparks is an English surname of Old English and Norse origin.

== Notable people with the surname ==
- Alf Sparks (1903–1954), Australian rules footballer
- Allister Sparks (1933–2016), South African writer, journalist, and political commentator
- Anthony Sparks, American screenwriter
- Barry Sparks (born 1968), American bassist
- Beatrice Sparks (1917–2012), American therapist
- Bill Sparks (1922–2002), British WWII Royal Marine
- Bradley Sparks (born 1967), Australian rules footballer
- Brian Sparks (1931–2013), Welsh rugby footballer
- Catriona Sparks (born 1965), Australian writer
- Charles Sparks (circus owner) (1882–1949), American circus proprietor
- Chauncey Sparks (1884–1968), American politician and attorney
- Cliff Sparks (1896–1975), American football player
- Clinton Sparks (born 1979), American DJ, songwriter, recording artist, and television personality
- Corrine Sparks, Canadian judge
- Dan Sparks (born 1968), American politician
- Dan Sparks (basketball) (born 1944), American basketball player
- Dana Sparks, American actor
- Daniel Sparks (politician) (born 1974), American politician
- Dave Sparks (1928–1954), American football player
- Donita Sparks (born 1963), American singer and guitarist
- Douglas Sparks (born 1956), American Episcopal bishop
- Evert Sparks (1879–1972), Canadian politician
- Felix L. Sparks (1917–2007), American military commander
- G. Sparks (Surrey cricketer) (fl. 1806–1810)
- Garret Sparks (born 1993), American ice hockey goaltender
- Greg Sparks (born 1964), American baseball coach
- Hal Sparks (born 1969), American actor, comedian, musician, political commentator, and television personality
- Hedley Sparks (1908–1996), British biblical scholar and Church of England priest
- Henry Sparks (1845–1900), Australian businessman
- Isaac Sparks (1719–1776), Irish stage actor
- Jamie Sparks (born 1992), British rower
- Jamie Sparks (singer), Canadian singer
- Jared Sparks (1789–1866), American historian, educator, and minister
- Jeff Sparks (born 1972), American baseball player
- Joe Sparks (coach) (born 1938), American baseball player and coach
- Joe Sparks (video game developer), American video game developer, animator, songwriter, web publisher, and guitarist
- John Sparks (disambiguation), multiple people
- Jordin Sparks (born 1989), American singer, songwriter, and actress
- Joseph Sparks (1901–1981), British trade unionist and politician
- Justin Sparks, American politician
- K. Sparks, American rapper
- Ken Sparks (1944–2007), American football coach and player
- Karen Sparks (born 1955), American accountant
- Kerrelyn Sparks, American author
- Larry Sparks (born 1947), American singer and guitarist
- Lindsay Sparks (1944–2025), New Zealand cricketer
- Luke Sparks (1711–1768), Irish stage actor
- Mark Sparks (born 1960), American flautist
- Maxwell Nicholas Sparks (1920–2013), Royal New Zealand Air Force and Royal Air Force pilot
- Melvin Sparks (1946–2011), American guitarist
- Mike Sparks (born 1967), American politician
- Morgan Sparks (1916–2008), American scientist
- Ned Sparks (1883–1957), Canadian actor
- Nicholas Sparks (born 1965), American author
- Nicholas Sparks (politician) (1794–1862), Irish Canadian politician and landowner
- Omillio Sparks (born 1979), American rapper
- Paul Sparks (born 1971), American actor
- Percy Sparks (1880–1959), Canadian manufacturer and environmentalist
- Phillippi Sparks (born 1969), American football player
- Randy Sparks (1933–2024), American musician
- Richard Sparks (born 1950), American conductor
- Robert Sparks (disambiguation), multiple people
- Ron Sparks (disambiguation), multiple people
- Sam Sparks (1939–2025), American judge
- Sarah Sparks (1754–1837), British actress
- Stephanie Sparks (1973–2024), American golfer
- Steve Sparks (disambiguation), multiple people
- Shane Sparks (born 1969), American hip-hop choreographer
- Theodore Austin-Sparks (1888–1971), British author and minister
- Theresa Sparks (born 1949), American civil rights activist
- Tiffany Sparks, Assistant Bishop, Anglican Diocese of Grafton
- Tim Sparks (born 1954), American musician
- Tommy Sparks (born 1986), British singer and songwriter
- Tori Sparks (born 1983), American singer-songwriter
- Tryphena Sparks (1851–1890), Thomas Hardy's cousin and possible lover
- Tully Sparks (1874–1937), American baseball player
- Vicki Sparks, British sports journalist and football commentator
- Will Sparks (born 1993), Australian DJ and producer
- Will Sparks (painter) (1862–1937), American painter
- William Sparks (disambiguation), multiple people

== Fictional characters ==
- Georgina Sparks, a character in the Gossip Girl novels and television series
- Jenny Sparks, a character in the Wildstorm comic book universe
- Sam Sparks, a character in the Cloudy with a Chance of Meatballs franchise
- Sparks, a character in the Toy Story 3 movie
- Sparks, a character from SuperKitties
- Niles Sparks, a character from The Terrible Two novel series
