= Captain O'Blunder =

Irish comedy play

Captain O'Blunder or The Brave Irishman is a comedy play by the Irish actor-manager Thomas Sheridan, first performed in the early 1740s at the Smock Alley Theatre in Dublin. It depicts the adventures of a naive Irishman in London.

It is a reworking of the 1704 comedy Squire Trelooby by William Congreve and John Vanbrugh, itself based on a French farce by Molière.

== List of Characters ==
- Tradewell - a London merchant
- Captain O'Blunder - an Irish officer (performed by Mr Sparks)
- Lucy - daughter of Tradewell
- Betty - Lucy's maid
- Cheatwell - Lucy's lover
- Sconce
- Monsieur Ragout
- Sergeant
- Dr Clyfter - Physician
- Dr Gellypot - Physician
- Captain O'Blunder's servant

== Bibliography ==
- Moody, Jane & O'Quinn, Daniel (ed.). The Cambridge companion to British theatre, 1730-1830. Cambridge University Press, 2007.
