= Samuel Garth =

English physician and poet

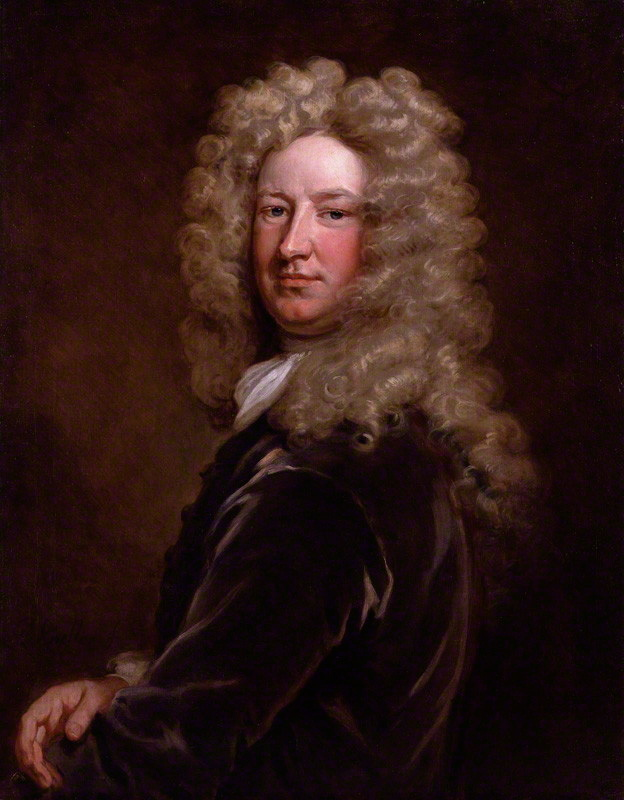
Samuel Garth by Godfrey Kneller.

Sir Samuel Garth FRS (1661 – 18 January 1719) was an English physician and poet.

== Life ==
Garth was born in Bolam in County Durham and matriculated at Peterhouse, Cambridge in 1676, graduating B.A. in 1679 and M.A. in 1684. He took his M.D. and became a member of the College of Physicians in 1691. He settled as a physician in London and soon acquired a large practice. He was a zealous Whig, the friend of Addison and, though of different political views, of Pope. He ended his career as physician to George I, who knighted him in 1714. The politician John Garth was a nephew of Samuel Garth.

In 1699 Samuel Garth was called to give evidence in what became known as the Sarah Stout Affair. Spencer Cowper, a lawyer and member of a prominent Hertfordshire family, was accused with some friends of the murder of a Quaker woman called Sarah Stout. The prosecution asserted that because the body was floating when found, that it must have been put in the water after death. Opinions were given at the trial by Samuel Garth and Hans Sloane. It appears that aside from the fact that the body was floating when found, there was no other evidence to support the charge. The defendants were acquitted, but the case remains interesting as an early example of attempts to use 'expert testimony' and forensic science evidence in a trial.

He was notably sharp-tongued: "God help the country where St Leger is made a judge"! he exclaimed in 1714, on hearing that Sir John St Leger, an Irish Whig barrister, had been appointed a High Court judge in Ireland.

For a while, he owned the manor of Edgcott in Buckinghamshire. He died on 18 January 1719.

== Works ==
In 1697 he delivered the Harveian Oration, in which he advocated a scheme dating from some ten years back for providing dispensaries for the relief of the sick poor, as a protection against the greed of the apothecaries. In 1699 he published a mock-heroic poem, The Dispensary, in six cantos, which had an instant success, passing through three editions within a year. In this, he ridiculed the apothecaries and their allies among the physicians.

Garth’s work is a satirical take on the traditional epic poem, and is perhaps one of the better examples of the “medical poetry” genre.

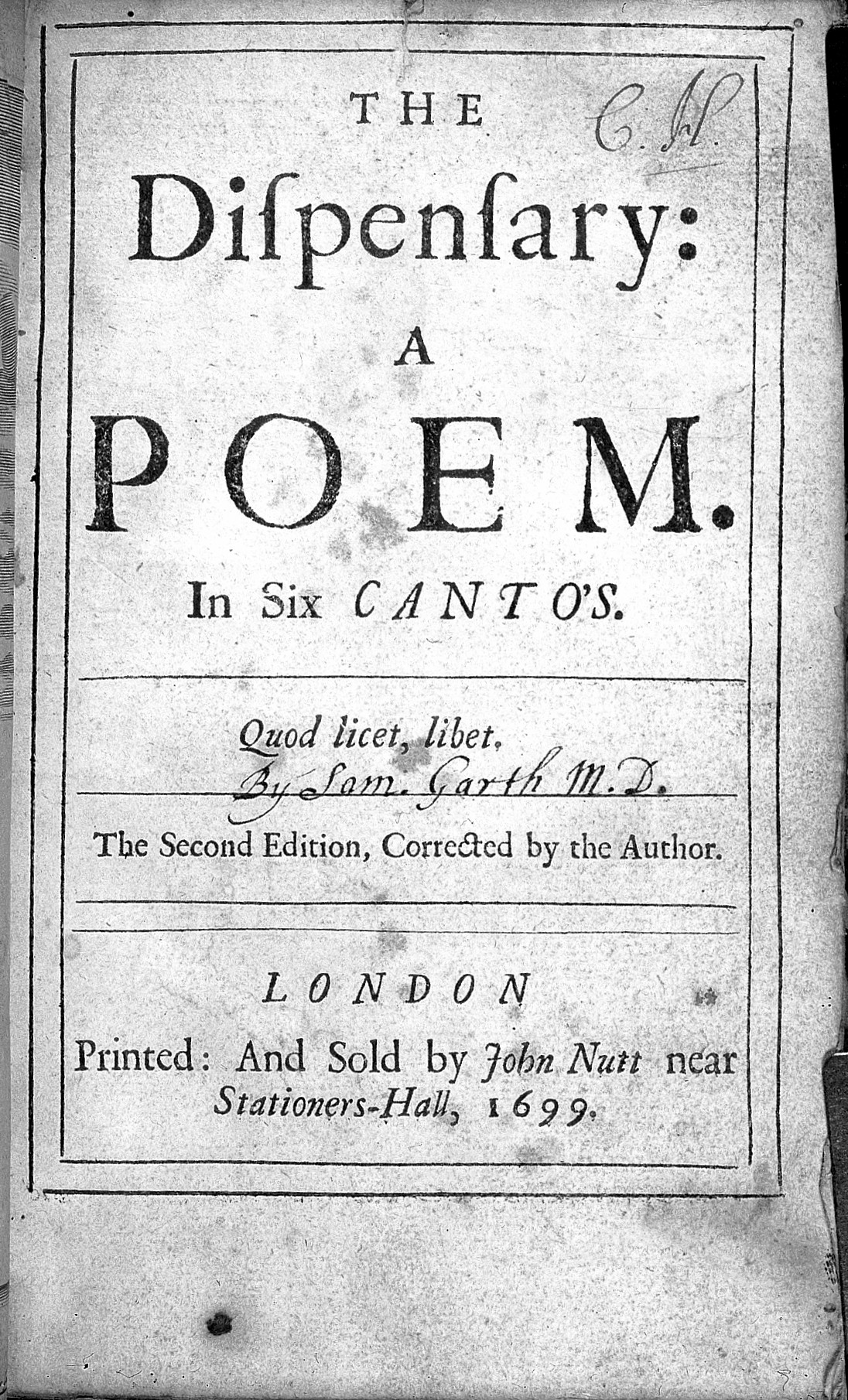

Long has he been of that amphibious fry,
Bold to prescribe, and busy to apply;
His shop the gazing vulgar's eyes employs,
With foreign trinkets and domestic toys.
Here mummies lay, most reverently stale,
And there the tortoise hung her coat of mail;
Not far from some huge shark's devouring head
The flying-fish their finny pinions spread.
Aloft in rows large poppy-heads were strung,
And near, a scaly alligator hung.
In this place drugs in musty heaps decay'd,
In that dried bladders and false teeth were laid.

An inner room receives the num'rous shoals
Of such as pay to be reputed fools;
Globes stand by globes, volumes on volumes lie,
And planetary schemes amuse the eye.
The sage in velvet chair here lolls at ease,
To promise future health for present fees;
Then, as from tripod, solemn shams reveals,
And what the stars know nothing of foretells.
Our manufactures now they merely sell,
And their true value treacherously tell;
Nay, they discover, too, their spite is such,
That health, than crowns more valued, cost not much;
Whilst we must steer our conduct by these rules,
To cheat as tradesmen, or to starve as fools.

He is also remembered as the author of Claremont, a descriptive poem. He translated the Life of Otho in the fifth volume of Dryden's Plutarch, and also edited a translation of Ovid's Metamorphoses, to which Addison, Pope, and others contributed. His intervention ensured an honourable burial for John Dryden and he pronounced a eulogy at the funeral in Westminster Abbey.

In 1704 he wrote the prologue for the play Squire Trelooby which his fellow Kit-Cat Club members Congreve, Vanbrugh and William Walsh had created.
