= David Sparks (disambiguation) =

David, Dave, Davey, Davie, Davy, named Sparks may refer to:

- David Walter "Dave" Sparks (1928–1954), U.S. American football player
- David "John" Sparks (born 1957), Australian rules footballer
- David "Heavy D" Sparks, a TV mechanic, part of the Diesel Brothers
- David Sparks, U.S. game show host of The Cross-Wits
- Dave L. Sparks, computer engineer for Creative Labs, who created DLS format
- Dave Sparks, UK politician who served as mayor of the Dudley Metropolitan Borough Council
- Dave Sparks, guitarist for the 1970s Australian punk rock band Lime Spiders
- David Sparks, guitarist for the 2000s American indie rock band Daphne Loves Derby
- Joshua David Sparks, drummer for the 2000s American indie rock band Into It. Over It.
- David Sparks Evans (born 1954) U.S. economist

== See also ==
- David (given name)
- Sparks (name)
