= John Lockman (priest) =

Rev. Dr. John Lockman FRS (1722–1807), Canon of Windsor

- Born: 18 April 1722
- Died: December 24, 1807 (aged 85)
- Education: Balliol College, Oxford
- Occupation: Canon of Windsor
- Spouse: Elizabeth Seare
- Children: Anna Maria; Caroline
- Parent(s): Christopher Lockman; Susanna Gumley
- Relatives: John Gumley (maternal grandfather); John Gumley (younger) (uncle); Anna Maria Pulteney (née Gumley) (aunt); William Pulteney (uncle)

John Lockman FRS D.D. (1722–1807) was a Canon of Windsor from 1758 to 1807

== Family ==
John Lockman was born 18 April 1722.

Lockman's father was (Christopher) Lockman, esq. of London, originally from Hanover, and had worked for King George II as dresser and Page of the Backstairs. His mother was Susanna Gumley, daughter of John Gumley and sister of Lady Bath (Anna Maria Pulteney (née Gumley)). His mother Susanna died 18 April 1722 from childbirth complications presumably after delivering John.

Lockman married Elizabeth Seare (daughter of Michael Seare, esq. as denoted on memorial, and daughter of Mary (Peachey)); Elizabeth was granddaughter of Sir John Peachey, 2nd Baronet, they had two daughters:

- Anna Maria Lockman (1764–1825), who married Edward Barker, esq. from West Tarring, Sussex on 19 November 1778.
- Caroline Lockman (1766–1820 or 1828)

== Career ==
He was educated at Balliol College, Oxford and graduated BA in 1748, and MA and Doctor in Divinity in 1769. Lockman was recognized as a natural philosopher, and had interested in painted glass. Lockman once owned "The statutes and ordinances of the most noble Order of Saint George named “ye Garter’ [manuscript on vellum]" from year 1571 by Order of the Garter.

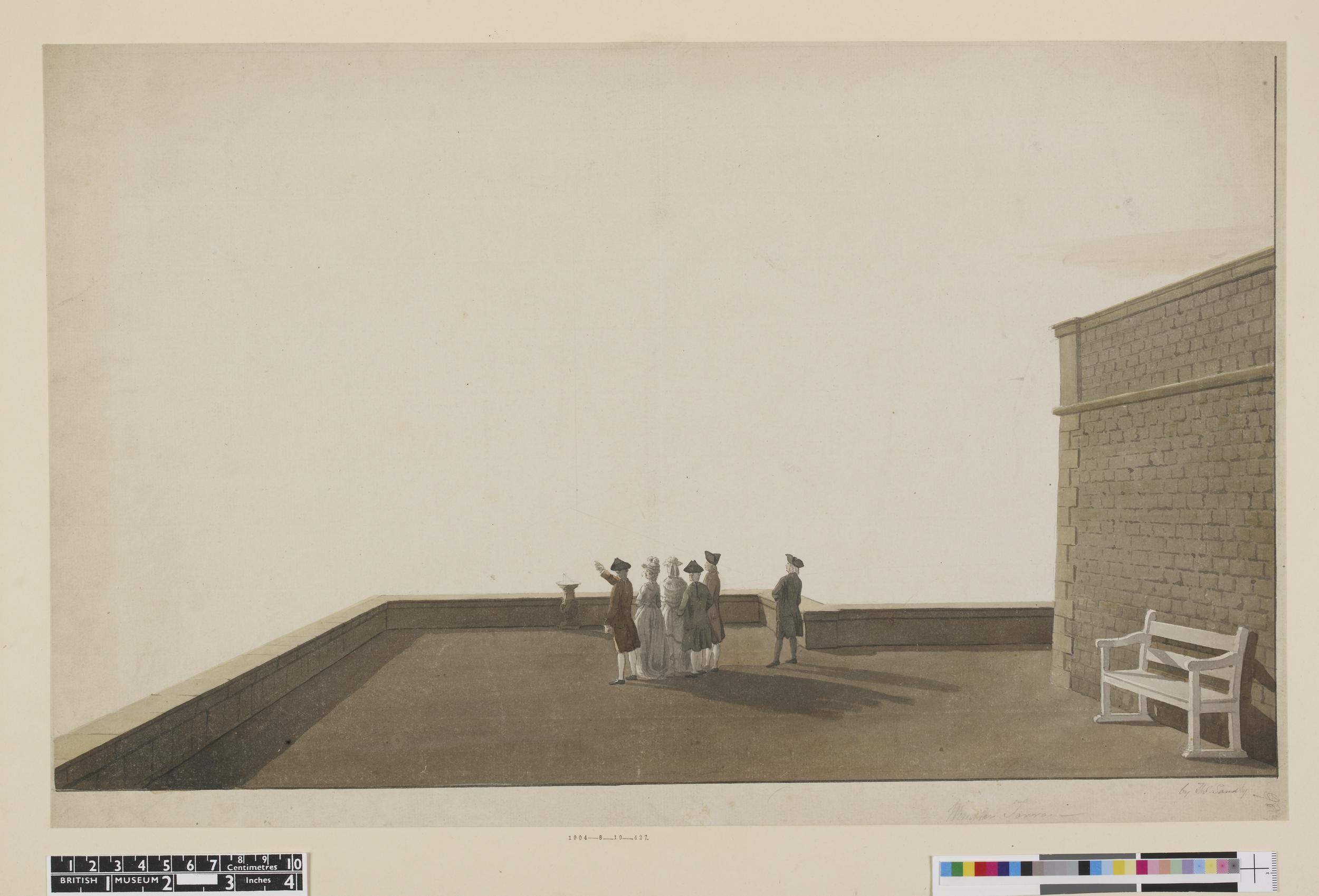
NE corner of the terrace at Windsor Castle, study for a print; with figures including Tiberius Cavallo, Dr James Lind, Rev. Dr. John Lockman, Caroline Herschel, Thomas Sandby looking out towards the 1783 Great Meteor on 18 Aug 1783 (background not shown), one pointing. 1783 Watercolour, over graphite

He was appointed:

- Rector of Dunstable 1753
- Rector of Hartley Westpall 1769
- Rector of Drayton Beauchamp 1773
- Fellow Royal Society of London 1778
- Rector of West Ilsley 1786
- Clerk of the Closet to George, Prince of Wales
- Master of the Hospital of St Cross Winchester

He was appointed to the second stall in St George's Chapel, Windsor Castle in 1758, and held the stall until 1807. in 1774, Lockman worked with King George III to refurbish parts of the Chapel's interior with plans to finance the project through donations from knights of the Order of the Garter, Lockman was paid 500 guinea. In addition to overseeing the project, a noteworthy contribution by Lockman included collecting all of the fifteenth century glass and consolidating the pieces into the single west window, which inspired a wave of artistic design for new windows.

Fanny Burney mentioned Lockman in her journal, "...and though he told us nothing either new or striking, he at least took care to give no disappointment after his first opening, by preaching in a manner that never drew our attention." Lockman also appears in the diary of Queen Charlotte

Lockman was a member of the Society for the Propagation of the Gospel in Foreign Parts and the Amicable Society for a Perpetual Assurance Office.

== Death ==
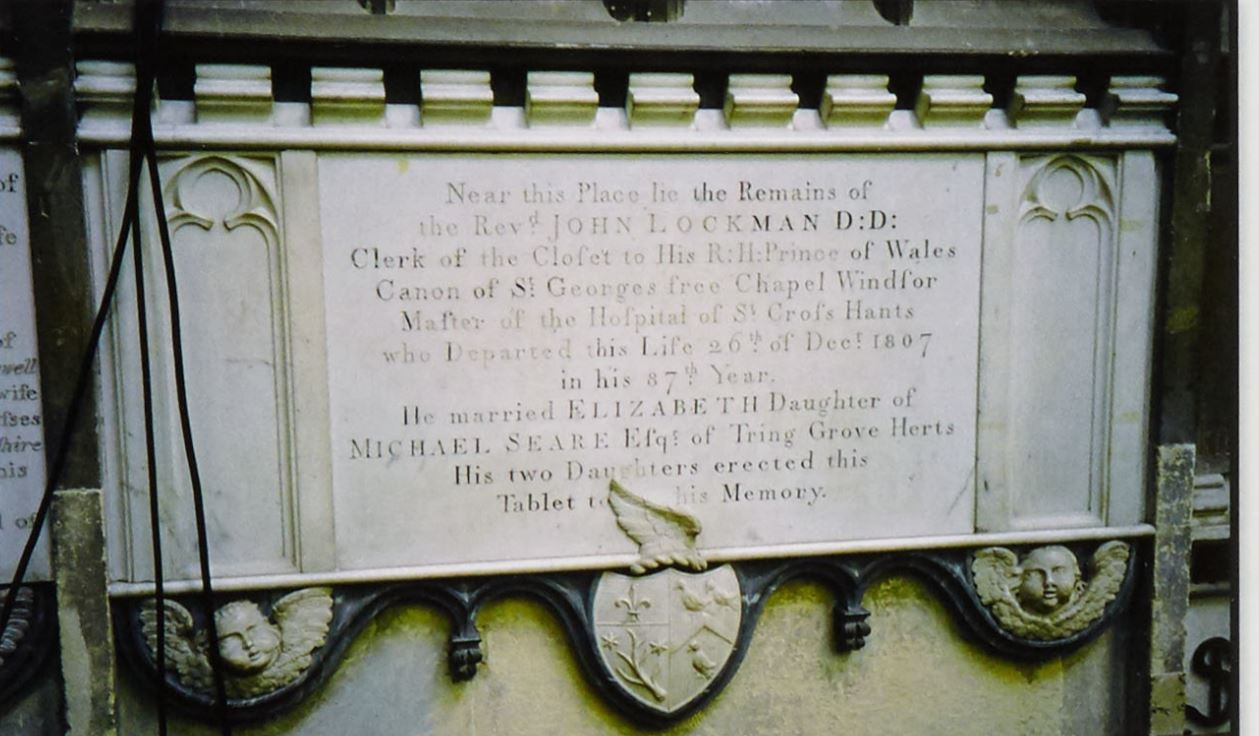
Rev John Lockman (1722–1807)

Rev. Dr. John Lockman died 24 December 1807. A memorial indicates he was "in his 87th year", however, this may conflict with his birthyear.

== Publications ==
- 1786 – Letter from Lockman to Baron Southampton
- Obituary
