= James Hoste (Bramber MP) =

British landowner and Whig politician

James Hoste (1705-1744), of Sandringham, Norfolk was a British landowner and Whig politician who sat in the House of Commons from 1728 to 1734.

Hoste was baptized on 15 October 1705, the son of James Hoste and his second wife Anne Bresley. His father's first wife, Elizabeth Walpole, was the aunt of Sir Robert Walpole. Hoste was descended from Jacques Hooste of Middleburgh, Zealand, who fled to England in 1569. He was admitted at Corpus Christi College, Cambridge in 1722. He married Susan Hammond, daughter of Anthony Hammond of South Wootton, Norfolk.

Hoste was put forward as candidate for Bramber on the Gough interest at a by-election on 2 March 1728. There were irregularities in the poll and the matter came to the House of Commons. William Pulteney the brother-in-law of John Gumley, Hoste's opponent, caused a furore by pointing out indirectly that Hoste, was a relation of Robert Walpole. Hoste was seated on petition on 4 April 1728 and voted with the Government in every recorded division. He did not stand at the 1734 British general election.

Hoste died on 20 August 1744 leaving a daughter.

Parliament of Great Britain
Preceded by John Gumley; Joseph Danvers	Member of Parliament for Bramber; 1728–1734; With: Joseph Danvers	Succeeded by Sir Harry Gough; Harry Gough (senior)
