= John Gumley (younger) =

British glass manufacturer

John Gumley (c. 1696 – c. 1749) was a British glass manufacturer, East India merchant and Tory politician who sat briefly in the House of Commons in 1728.

Gumley was the second son of John Gumley of Isleworth and his wife Susannah White, daughter of Samuel White, merchant of London. He married his cousin Martha Wittewrong, daughter of Sir John Wittewrong, 3rd Baronet, who had married Gumley's mother's sister.

Gumley was returned as Member of Parliament for Bramber, where his father was steward of the court leet, at a by-election on 2 March 1728. He was unseated on petition on 4 April 1728 for alleged malpractices by the returning officer, who was his father's nominee. Gumley was the brother-in-law of William Pulteney who caused a furore when the matter came before the house by pointing out indirectly that Gumley's opponent, John Hoste, was a relation of Robert Walpole.

Gumley inherited his father's share in the Vauxhall glass works when his father died in 1728. In 1734 he went as head merchant to Bengal, which entitled him to become a member of Council.

Gumley died without issue before 1749. He was the brother of Samuel Gumley.

Parliament of Great Britain
Preceded by Sir Richard Gough; Joseph Danvers	Member of Parliament for Bramber; 1728; With: Joseph Danvers	Succeeded by James Hoste; Joseph Danvers
