= John Sparke =

John Sparke may refer to:

- John Sparke (died 1566) English MP for Plympton Erle
- John Sparke (died 1640) English MP for Mitchell
- John Sparke (died 1680) English MP for Plymouth

== See also ==
- John Spark (died 1707) English MP for Newport, Cornwall
- John Sparkes, comedian
- John Sparks (disambiguation)
