= Joseph Danvers =

English politician (1686–1753)

Arms of the Danvers baronets of Swithland: Argent, on a bend gules three martlets of the field. A difference of the modern arms of Danvers of Culworth (modern)/Brancastre. The relationship between the two families is unclear

Sir Joseph Danvers, 1st Baronet (24 December 1686 – 21 October 1753), of Swithland, Leicestershire, was an English politician who sat in the House of Commons from 1722 to 1747.

Danvers was the eldest son of Samuel Danvers of Swithland and his wife Elizabeth Morewood, only daughter of Joseph Morewood, merchant, of London and Overton, Derbyshire. He succeeded his father in 1693. He was admitted at Lincoln's Inn on 14 January 1709. In 1721, he succeeded to the Oxfordshire estates of his mother's second husband, John Danvers. He married Frances Babington, the daughter of Thomas Babington of Rothley Temple, Leicestershire on 7 December 1721. He was elected a Fellow of the Royal Society in 1724 .

Danvers was appointed High Sheriff of Leicestershire for 1721 (June to December). He was returned as Member of Parliament (MP) for Boroughbridge at a by-election on 24 October 1722 by the Duke of Newcastle at the request of Lord Sunderland. He was a frequent speaker in Parliament. At the 1727 British general election he was returned as MP for Bramber. He switched seats and was returned as MP for Totnes at the 1734 British general election. He was returned again at the 1741 British general election and was made a baronet in 1746 before his retirement at the 1747 British general election.

Danvers died on 21 October 1753 and was buried at St Leonard's churchyard, Swithland in a tomb built half inside the graveyard and half outside on Danvers' estate to allow his favourite dog to be buried with him (the dog being buried on unconsecrated ground). He had one son John who succeeded to the baronetcy and four daughters.

Parliament of Great Britain
Preceded by Conyers Darcy; James Tyrrell	Member of Parliament for Boroughbridge; 1722–1727; With: James Tyrrell	Succeeded by George Gregory; James Tyrrell
Preceded by Sir Richard Gough; David Polhill	Member of Parliament for Bramber; 1727–1734; With: Sir Richard Gough 1727–1728; John Gumley 1728; James Hoste 1728–1734	Succeeded by Sir Henry Gough; Harry Gough
Preceded by Sir Henry Gough, Bt; Sir Charles Wills	Member of Parliament for Totnes; 1734–1747; With: Sir Charles Wills 1734–1742; John Strange 1742–1747	Succeeded by Charles Taylor; John Strange
Baronetage of Great Britain
New creation	Baronet (of Swithland); 1746–1753	Succeeded by John Danvers
