= James Moore (furniture designer) =

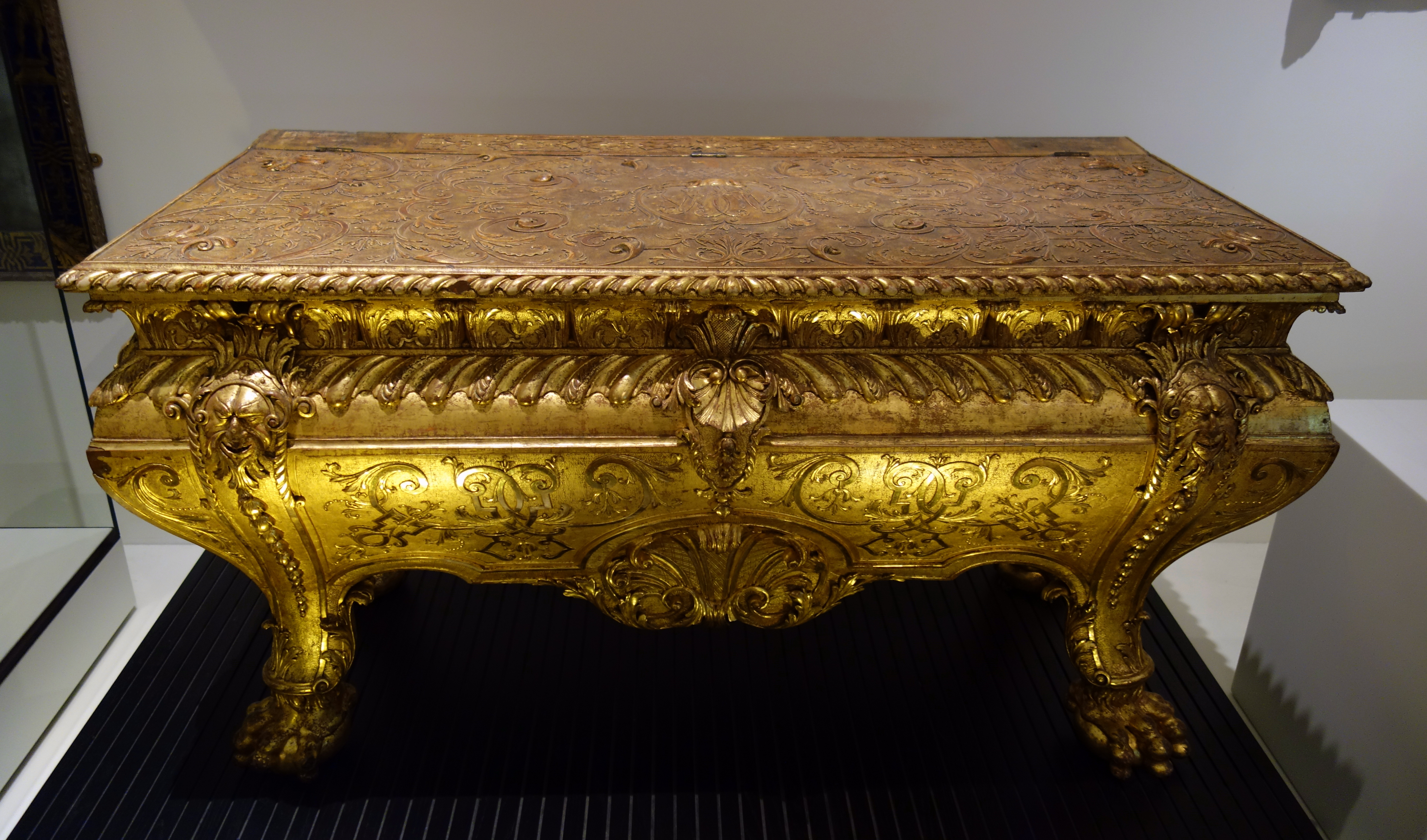
Bateman Chest, possibly made by James Moore the elder, c. 1720

James Moore (c. 1670 - October 1726) was an 18th-century cabinet maker in London who worked for George I. He was in partnership with John Gumley from 1714. As royal cabinet-maker he supplied walnut and mahogany furniture for the royal household, the royal yacht, and the king's servants and mistresses, as well as the rich gilt gesso furniture for which he is best known but which constituted a small part of his output.

Early references to Moore are in the Duke of Montagu's domestic expenses, 1708, and the entry in the accounts of Lord Hervey, soon created Earl of Bristol, for "glass piers & sconces", 1710. Moore and his son, James Moore the younger, were among craftsmen furnishing Cannons for James Brydges, 1st Duke of Chandos A gilt gesso table from Stowe House, now at the Victoria and Albert is in the unmistakable style of James Moore; it bears the cypher and baron's coronet of Richard Temple, Lord Cobham, and can be dated 1714–18 on that basis.

James Moore assumed the position of clerk of the works at Blenheim Palace, completing and furnishing the house after Sarah Churchill, Duchess of Marlborough, quarreled with her architect, John Vanbrugh; Moore had first appeared as the Duchess's "glass man", providing pier glasses in the house. By 1714 the Duchess referred to him as "my oracle, Mr. Moore" who "certainly has very good sense and I think him very honest and understanding in many trades besides his own."

Moore is especially known for gilt gesso furniture, tables looking-glass frames and candlestands. A pair of gilt gesso side tables bearing the crowned cypher of George I in the Royal Collection and the pair of candlestands en suite are incised with his name, an unusual practice at the time. At Erddig, gilt gesso furniture by Moore can be linked to surviving bills receipted by James Moore and John Belchier, 1722–26.

The succeeding royal cabinet-maker, Benjamin Goodison, trained in Moore's workshop.
