= Squire Trelooby =

1704 play by William Congreve

- Original language: English
- Written by: William Congreve; John Vanbrugh; William Walsh
- Genre: Comedy

Premiere
- Date: 30 March 1704
- Place: Lincoln's Inn Fields Theatre

Squire Trelooby is a 1704 farce by the writers William Congreve, John Vanbrugh and William Walsh. All were members of the Kit-Cat Club, and another member, Samuel Garth, wrote a prologue. The farce was inspired by the French play Monsieur de Pourceaugnac by Molière.

In 1734 James Ralph wrote The Cornish Squire, a reworking of the play which was staged at the Drury Lane Theatre. It was considered a great success, and was followed by another version The Brave Irishman by Thomas Sheridan at Dublin's Smock Alley Theatre in 1744.

== Bibliography ==
- Burling, William J. A Checklist of New Plays and Entertainments on the London Stage, 1700–1737. Fairleigh Dickinson Univ Press, 1992.
- Genest, John (1832). Some Account of the English Stage from the Restoration in 1660 to 1830. Vol. 3. Bath: H. E. Carrington.
- Field, Ophelia. The Kit-Cat Club: Friends Who Imagined a Nation. HarperCollins 2009.
- Sheldon, Esther K. Thomas Sheridan of Smock-Alley. Princeton University Press, 2015.
