= Isaac Sparks =

Irish stage actor

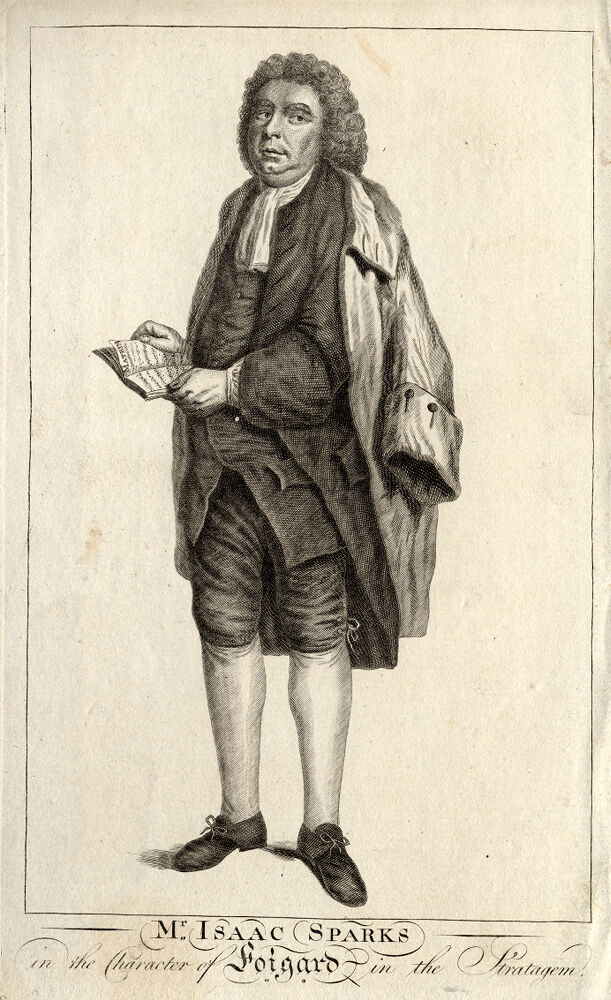
- Sparks as Foigard in The Beaux' Stratagem
- Born: 1719; Dublin
- Died: 1776 (aged 56–57)
- Occupation: stage actor
- Notable work: originating and inspiring the role of Captain O'Blunder

Isaac Sparks (1719–1776) was an Irish stage actor.

== Life ==
Sparks was born in Dublin, the younger brother of actor Luke Sparks. He established himself on the Dublin stage in the 1730s, appearing at both the Ransford Street Theatre and Smock Alley and then the Aungier Street Theatre during the 1740s. In 1745 he made his London debut at the Drury Lane Theatre and remained in the company there until 1748.

Along with the author George Alexander Stevens, Sparks founded the "Nassau Court" as a club, which held mock trails with Sparks known as the "Lord Chief Joker Sparks". In the early 1740s he was "the original Captain O'Blunder" as the eponymous character in Thomas Sheridan's play, and according to John O'Keefe, a role supposedly inspired by the Nassau Court moniker. It is claimed that the play was so popular that it was Sparks' likeness that was used on numerous public house signs:

One day, in coming out of a tavern he passed under one of these and a chair-man standing by, looking first at the original with great admiration and then at the copy, vociferated: "Oh, there you are, above and below!"

He then returned to Dublin and was part of the Smock Alley company until 1758, before transferring to the new Crow Street Theatre for two years, before again returning to Smock Alley. His also performed widely in Irish provincial theatres, with visits to Belfast, Cork and Limerick amongst others. He was known for playing parts in Shakespearean plays as well as those of John Dryden and Thomas Otway. Among the actors he worked with was Peg Woffington, described as an "excellent low comedian and a favourite clown in pantomime".

In 1769 he was in London at the Haymarket Theatre and also again featured again at Drury Lane. His last known acting appearances were in Dublin at Crow Street in 1771. He described in the Dublin Evening Post on 29 May 1779 as a "veteran trouper of the Irish stage".

William Clark Russell noted that Sparks was distinguished from his brother with "his commanding form and flow of humour."

== Bibliography ==
- Highfill, Philip H, Burnim, Kalman A. & Langhans, Edward A. A Biographical Dictionary of Actors, Actresses, Musicians, Dancers, Managers, and Other Stage Personnel in London, 1660-1800: Volume VIX. SIU Press, 1973.
