= Steve Sparks =

Steve or Stephen Sparks may refer to:

- Steve Sparks (volcanologist) (born 1949), British volcanologist
- Steve Sparks (pitcher, born 1965), Major League Baseball pitcher, 1995–2004 and Houston Astros radio broadcaster
- Steve Sparks (pitcher, born 1975), MLB pitcher for the Pittsburgh Pirates, 2000
