= Ron Sparks =

Ron Sparks may refer to:

- Ron Sparks (comedian) (born 1977), Canadian comedian, actor and writer
- Ron Sparks (fighter) (born 1974), American mixed martial artist
- Ron Sparks (politician) (born 1952), American politician
- Ron E Sparks (1952–2024), Australian radio personality

== See also ==
- Ron Mael (born 1945), member of the band Sparks
