= John Sparks =

John Sparks may refer to:

- John Sparks (Nevada politician) (1843–1908), Governor of Nevada
- John Sparks (Oklahoma politician), Oklahoma state senator and district representative
- John Sparks (cricketer, born 1778) (1778–1854), English cricketer
- John Sparks (cricketer, born 1873), English cricketer
- John Sparks (footballer) (born 1957), Australian footballer for Melbourne
- John E. Sparks (born 1953), Associate Judge of the United States Court of Appeals for the Armed Forces
- John Sparks (rugby league), Australian rugby league player

== See also ==
- John Sparkes (born 1954), Welsh comedian
- John Sparke (disambiguation)
