= Luke Sparks =

Irish actor

- Born: 1711
- Died: 1768 (aged 56–57)
- Occupation: stage actor

Luke Sparks (1711–1768) was an Irish stage actor of the eighteenth century.

== Life ==
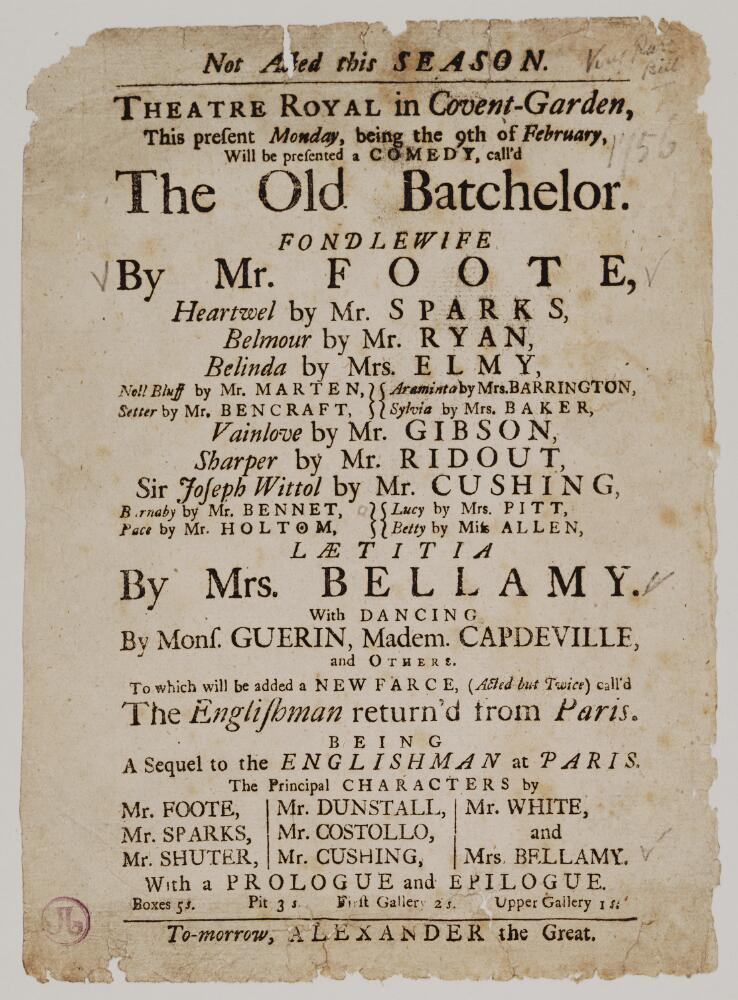
Playbill of Covent Garden, 9 February 1756, announcing The old batchelor featuring Sparks

He was born in Dublin, the son of a staymaker and brother of Isaac Sparks who also became an actor. His first known role was at the Smock Alley Theatre in 1733. For several years he alternated between Smock Alley and the Ransford Street Theatre, also in Dublin. In 1739 he appeared in London at Covent Garden and Drury Lane in George Farquhar's The Twin Rivals.

Returning for Dublin for several years he featured at the new Aungier Street Theatre. From 1745 to 1748 he was part of the company at Drury Lane, before shifting to Covent Garden in October 1748 where he remained until 1765. He took on a number of parts in Shakespeare plays including Gloucester and Kent in King Lear, and Henry IV. He was among the actors impersonated by actor and theatre manager Tate Wilkinson early in his career. When Sparks complained to the director, David Garrick, Garrick responded "Come, come, Luke, you had better take no notice of it ; consider, if you are mimicked, it is in good company." Sparks replied "True, but I have known many a man ruined by keeping good company."

William Clark Russell noted that Sparks was "was distinguished by his amiability and his general usefulness" as an actor, and "equally good in tragedy and that comedy." William Rufus Chetwood noted "He may be accounted a person in the highest second-class."

By 1761 he was earning £7 a week. He retired in 1765, possibly due health and settled in Brentford. His son James Sparks also acted briefly on the London stage.

== Bibliography ==
- Highfill, Philip H, Burnim, Kalman A. & Langhans, Edward A. A Biographical Dictionary of Actors, Actresses, Musicians, Dancers, Managers, and Other Stage Personnel in London, 1660–1800: Volume VIX. SIU Press, 1973.
