= Robert Sparks =

Robert Sparks may refer to:

- Robert Sparks (handballer) (born 1947), American handball player
- Robert Stewart Sparks (1871–1932), Los Angeles City Council member
- Sir Robert Stephen John Sparks (born 1949), British volcanologist
- Robert Sparks (producer), film producer of 1938 film Blondie
