= Alf Sparks =

Australian rules footballer, born 1903

Personal information
- Full name: Alfred Benjamin Sparks
- Born: 7 January 1903; Avoca, Victoria
- Died: 10 April 1954 (aged 51); Prahran, Victoria
- Original team: Avoca
- Height: 170 cm (5 ft 7 in)
- Weight: 66 kg (146 lb)

Playing career^{1}
Years	Club	Games (Goals)
1926	Collingwood	3 (0)
- ^{1} Playing statistics correct to the end of 1926.

Alfred Benjamin Sparks (7 January 1903 – 10 April 1954) was an Australian rules footballer who played for the Collingwood Football Club in the Victorian Football League (VFL).

== Family ==
The son of George Metcalfe Sparks (1870-1947), and Mary May Sparks (1975-1949), née Impey, Alfred Benjamin Sparks — known as "Tom" or "Tommy" to his family — was born at Avoca, Victoria on 7 January 1903.

He married Eliza Clare Grimster (1901-1972) in 1940.

== Football ==
Recruited from Avoca, he played in three consecutive First XVIII games with Collingwood in 1926.

== Death ==
He died at his residence in Prahran, Victoria on 10 April 1954.
