= John Gumley =

British furniture maker and politician (c.1670–1728)

- Born: c. 1670
- Died: 19 December 1728 (aged 57–58)
- Occupation(s): Furniture maker, politician
- Spouse: Susannah White (m. 1692)
- Children: George; John; Samuel; Anna Maria; Susanna; Mary; Laetitia
- Parent(s): Peter Gumley; Elizabeth Davis
- Relatives: William Pulteney (grandson); John Lockman (grandson); George Colman (grandson); Gerard Lake (grandson)

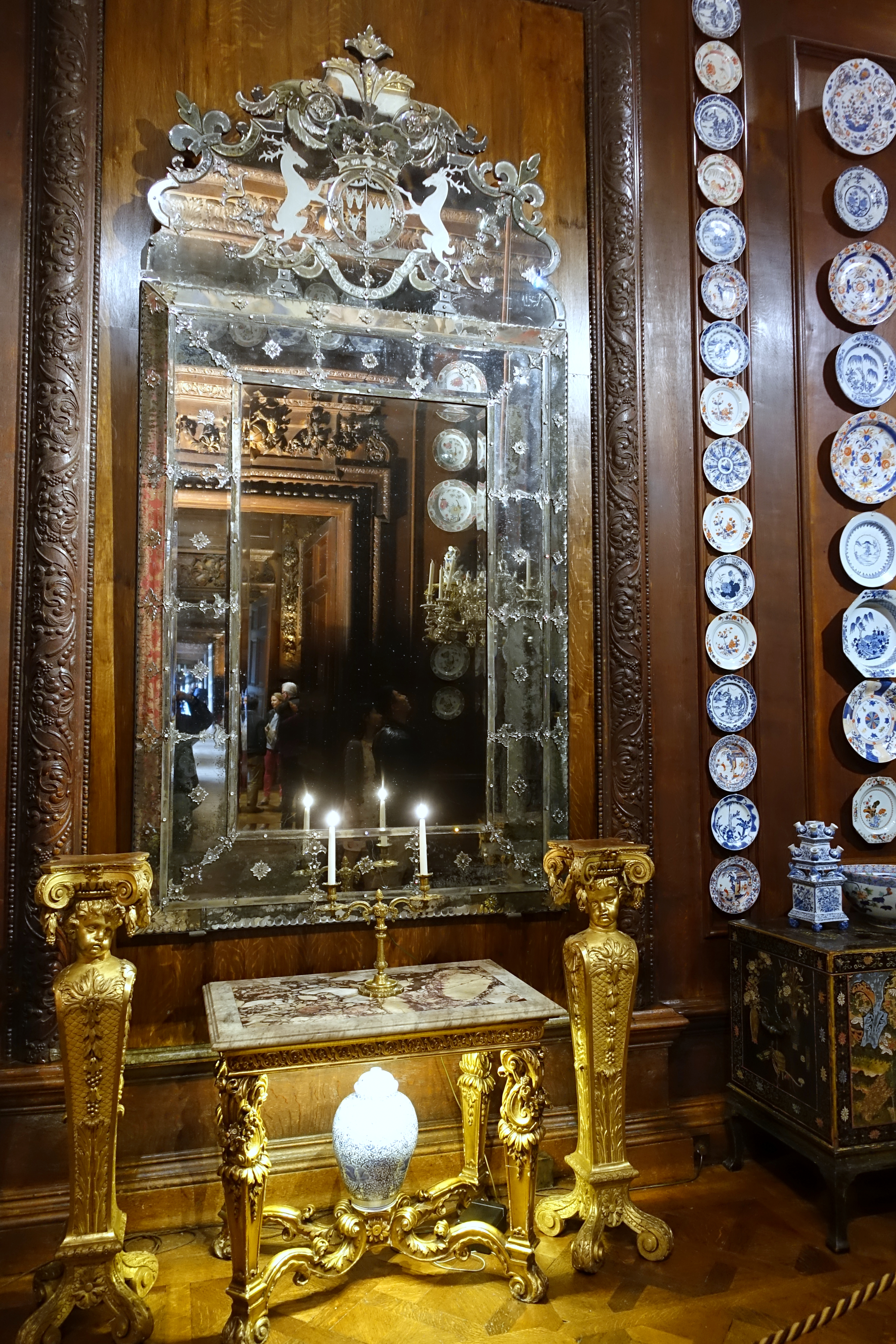
Mirror by John Gumley, 1703, in Chatsworth House

John Gumley (c. 1670 – 19 December 1728) was an English furniture maker and politician.

== Life ==
Gumley was the eldest son of Peter Gumley, a cabinet maker, and Elizabeth Davis. In 1692, he married Susannah White, sister-in-law to Sir John Wittewrong, 3rd Baronet. By 1694, he was advertising "all sorts of cabinet work", but his most successful enterprises were in glass-making. In 1703, he supplied large mirrors to Chatsworth House, and in 1705 opened a glass-house at Lambeth. In 1712, his work was praised by Richard Steele in The Spectator.

Gumley and James Moore succeeded Gerrit Jensen as royal cabinet-makers in 1715, and in 1716 Pulteney appointed Gumley Deputy Commissioner of Musters. After unsuccessfully contesting Bramber (UK Parliament constituency) in 1722, he became MP for Steyning. In 1724, he was appointed Commissary General of Musters. He built Gumley House in Isleworth which was left to his daughter Anna Maria. Retiring as an MP in 1727. He died on 19 December 1728, aged 57 or 58.

== Family legacy ==
After Gumley's death his wife Susan Gumley continued the business.

He had three sons and four daughters. Gumley's daughter, Anna Maria married William Pulteney, the future Earl of Bath in 1714. Gumley's daughter Susanna married Christopher Lockman and died from childbirth complications upon delivering their son, Rev. Dr. John Lockman, Canon of Windsor. Gumley's daughter Mary married Francis Colman and their son George Colman was a playwright. Gumley's daughter Laetitia married Launcelot Charles Lake and their son Gerard was a general.

He plainly thought very little of his eldest son, George who was to all intents and purposes disinherited being given a stipend of £150 a year on condition that he did not get in contact with his mother. His other son, John succeeded him as a partner in the glass manufactory of Richard Hughes & Co. of Vauxhall and went out to India where he was first Chief of Dacca. His third son, Samuel was an army officer.
