= William Sparks =

William or Bill Sparks may refer to:

- Bill Sparks (1922–2002), British soldier in World War II
- William A. J. Sparks (1828–1904), U.S. Representative from Illinois
- William J. Sparks (1905–1976), Exxon chemist and president of the American Chemical Society
- William Morris Sparks (1872–1950), U.S. federal judge
- William Henry Sparks (1800–1882), American lawyer and poet

== See also ==
- Billy Sparks, character in Young Sheldon
