= John Vanbrugh =

English architect and dramatist (1664–1726)

Sir John Vanbrugh
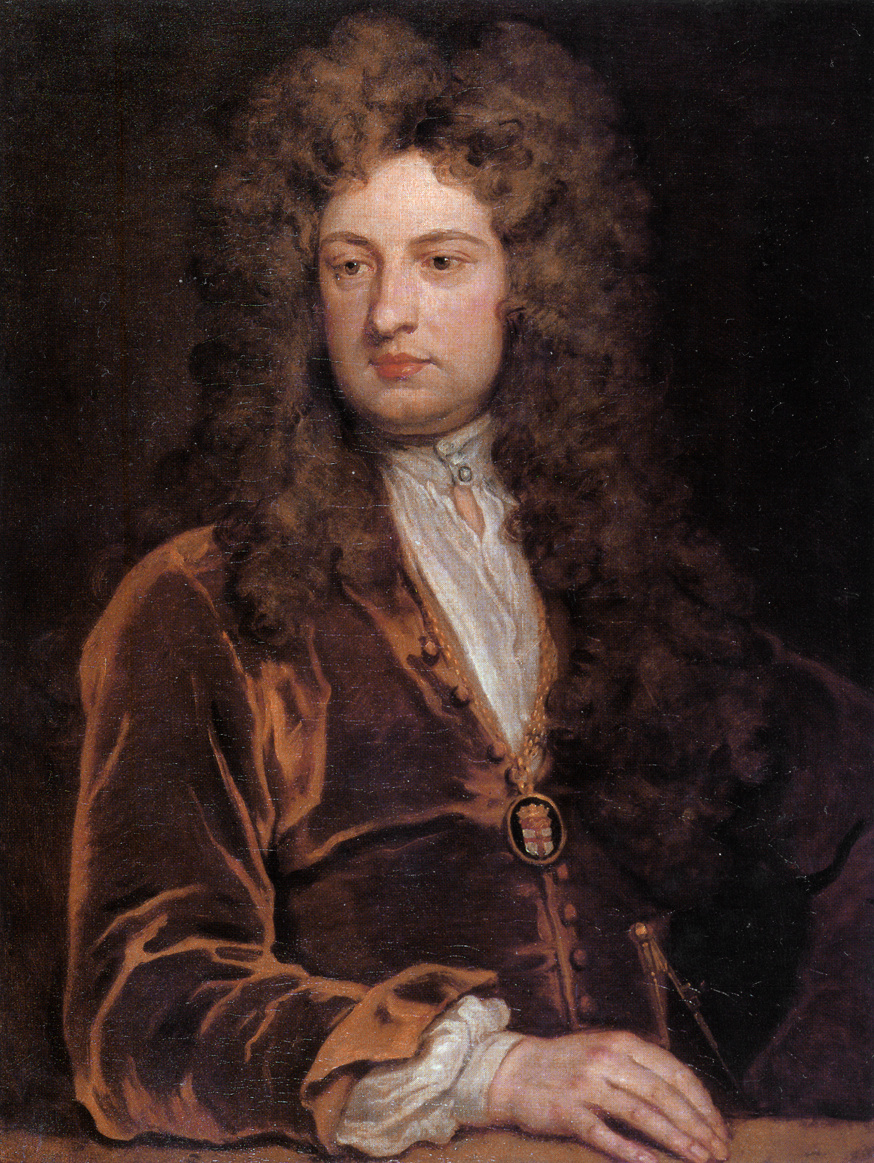
- Portrait by Sir Godfrey Kneller, c. 1705
- Born: 24 January 1664 (baptised); London, England
- Died: 26 March 1726 (aged 62); Westminster, England
- Occupation: Architect
- Buildings: Blenheim Palace; Castle Howard; Seaton Delaval Hall; Grimsthorpe Castle; Stowe House; Kings Weston House

Sir John Vanbrugh (/ˈvænbrə/; 24 January 1664 (baptised) – 26 March 1726) was an English architect, dramatist and herald, perhaps best known as the designer of Blenheim Palace and Castle Howard. He wrote two argumentative and outspoken Restoration comedies, The Relapse (1696) and The Provoked Wife (1697), which have become enduring stage favourites but originally occasioned much controversy. He was knighted in 1714.

Vanbrugh was in many senses a radical throughout his life. As a young man and a committed Whig, he was part of the scheme to overthrow James II and put William III on the throne. He was imprisoned by the French as a political prisoner. In his career as a playwright, he offended many sections of Restoration and 18th century society, not only by the sexual explicitness of his plays, but also by their messages in defence of women's rights in marriage. He was attacked on both counts, and was one of the prime targets of Jeremy Collier's Short View of the Immorality and Profaneness of the English Stage.

In his architectural career, he created what came to be known as English Baroque. His architectural work was as bold and daring as his early political activism and marriage-themed plays, and jarred conservative opinions on the subject.

== Early life and background ==
Born in London and baptised on 24 January 1664, Vanbrugh was the fourth child (of 19), and eldest surviving son, of Giles Vanbrugh, a London cloth-merchant of Flemish descent (as evident in the name, contracted from "Van Brugh") and Protestant background, and his wife Elizabeth, widow of Thomas Barker (by whom Vanbrugh's mother had the first of her twenty children, Vanbrugh's elder half-sister, Elizabeth), and daughter of Sir Dudley Carleton, of Imber Court, Thames Ditton, Surrey. He grew up in Chester, where his family had been driven by either the major outbreak of the plague in London in 1665, or the Great Fire of 1666. (Note: Vanbrugh's family background and youth have been relayed down the centuries as hearsay and anecdote. Kerry Downes has shown in his well-researched modern biography (1987) that even the Encyclopædia Britannica and the Dictionary of National Biography repeat 18th- and 19th-century traditions which were originally offered as guesses but have since hardened into "fact". This accounts for several discrepancies between the entries in these encyclopædias and the following narrative, which is based on the findings of Downes (1987) and McCormick (1991).) It is possible that he attended The King's School in Chester, though no records of his being a scholar there survive. Another candidate would have been the school at Ashby-de-la-Zouch, founded by Henry Hastings, 3rd Earl of Huntingdon. It was also not uncommon for boys to be sent to study at school away from home, or with a tutor.

Architectural historian Kerry Downes is sceptical of earlier historians' claims of a lower middle-class background, and writes that a 19th-century suggestion that Giles Vanbrugh was a sugar-baker has been misunderstood. "Sugar-baker" implies wealth, as the term refers not to a maker of sweets but to the owner of a sugar house, a factory for the refining of raw sugar from Barbados. Sugar refining would normally have been combined with sugar trading, which was a lucrative business. Downes' example of one sugar baker's house in Liverpool, estimated to bring in £40,000 a year in trade from Barbados, throws a new light on Vanbrugh's social background, one rather different from the picture of a backstreet Chester sweetshop as painted by Leigh Hunt in 1840 and reflected in many later accounts.

To dispel the myth of Vanbrugh's humble origins, Downes took pains to explore Vanbrugh's background, closely examining the family and connexions of each of his four grandparents: Vanbrugh, Jacobs or Jacobson, Carleton, and Croft, summing up the characteristics of each line and concluding that, far from being of lower middle class origins, Vanbrugh was descended from Anglo-Flemish or Netherlandish Protestant merchants who settled in London in the 16th and 17th centuries, minor courtiers, and country gentry. The complex web of kinship Downes' research shows that Vanbrugh had ties to many of England's leading mercantile, gentry, and noble families. These ties reveal the decidedly Protestant and sometimes radical milieu out of which Vanbrugh's own political opinions came. They also gave him a very wide social network that would play a role in all sections of his career: architectural, ceremonial, dramatic, military, political, and social.

Taken in this context, though he has sometimes been viewed as an odd or unqualified appointee to the College of Arms, it is not surprising, given the social expectations of his day, that by descent his credentials for his offices there were sound. His forebears, both Flemish/Dutch and English, were armigerous, and their coats of arms can be traced in three out of four cases, revealing that Vanbrugh was of gentle descent (Jacobson, of Antwerp and London [the family of his paternal grandmother Maria daughter of Peter brother to Philip Jacobson, jeweller and financier to successive English kings, James I, and Charles I, and monied backer of the Second Virginia Company and the East India Company]; Carleton of Imber Court; Croft of Croft Castle).

After growing up in a large household in Chester (12 children of his mother's second marriage survived infancy), the question of how Vanbrugh spent the years from age 18 to 22 (after he left school) was long unanswered, with the baseless suggestion sometimes made that he had been studying architecture in France (stated as fact in the Dictionary of National Biography). In 1681 records name a 'John Vanbrugg' working for William Matthews, Giles Vanbrugh's cousin. It was not unusual for a merchant's son to follow in his father's trade and seek similar work in business, making use of family ties and connections. However, Robert Williams proved in an article in the Times Literary Supplement ("Vanbrugh's Lost Years", 3 September 1999) that Vanbrugh was in India for part of this period, working for the East India Company at their trading post in Surat, Gujarat where his uncle, Edward Pearce, had been Governor. However, Vanbrugh never mentioned this experience in writing. Scholars debate whether evidence of his exposure to Indian architecture can be detected in any of his architectural designs.

The picture of a well-connected youth is reinforced by the fact that Vanbrugh in January 1686 took up an officer's commission in his distant relative the Earl of Huntingdon's foot regiment. Since commissions were in the gift of the commanding officer, Vanbrugh's entry as an officer shows that he did have the kind of family network that was then essential to a young man starting out in life. Even so in August 1686 he left this position when the regiment was ordered to help garrison Guernsey.

In spite of the distant noble relatives and the lucrative sugar trade, Vanbrugh never seemed to possess any capital for business ventures (such as the Haymarket Theatre), but always had to rely on loans and backers. The fact that Giles Vanbrugh had twelve children to support and set up in life may go some way towards explaining the debts that were to plague John all his life.

=== Connections ===
Some of Vanbrugh's kinsmen – as he addressed them in his letters:

- The Earl of Arran (1639–1686). His wife (from 1673), Vanbrugh's first cousin, was Dorothy née Ferrers.
- The 3rd Earl of Berkshire (1619–1706). Frances née Harrison, Countess of Berkshire. Vanbrugh's grandfather's sister, Elizabeth Carleton married John Harrison, uncle of the Countess of Berkshire and in addition the Countess's aunt, Anne Garrard, married Dudley Carleton, Viscount Dorchester, uncle to Vanbrugh's same grandfather. Frances was (half) second cousin to Vanbrugh's mother.
- The 3rd Earl of Carlisle (1669–1738) of Castle Howard. Carlisle's grandmother, Lady Anne Howard, Countess of Carlisle, was first cousin to the 3rd Earl of Berkshire.
- The Duke of Devonshire (1640–1707). His duchess was the Earl of Arran's sister.
- The 2nd Earl of Chesterfield (1634–1714). His countess was the Earl of Arran's sister. His uncle Ferdinando Stanhope married Lettice Ferrers, aunt of the Countess of Arran.
- The 7th Earl of Huntingdon (1650–1701). Vanbrugh's mother was his (half) third cousin.

Vanbrugh's younger brothers, Charles MP and Philip, Governor of Newfoundland Colony, were naval commanders.

Vanbrugh's own first and second cousins included Sir Humphrey Ferrers (1652–1678), Sir Herbert Croft Bt (1652–1720), Sir Roger Cave Bt (1655–1703) and Cave's sister, wife of Sir Orlando Bridgeman Bt (1650–1701).

== Political activism and the Bastille ==
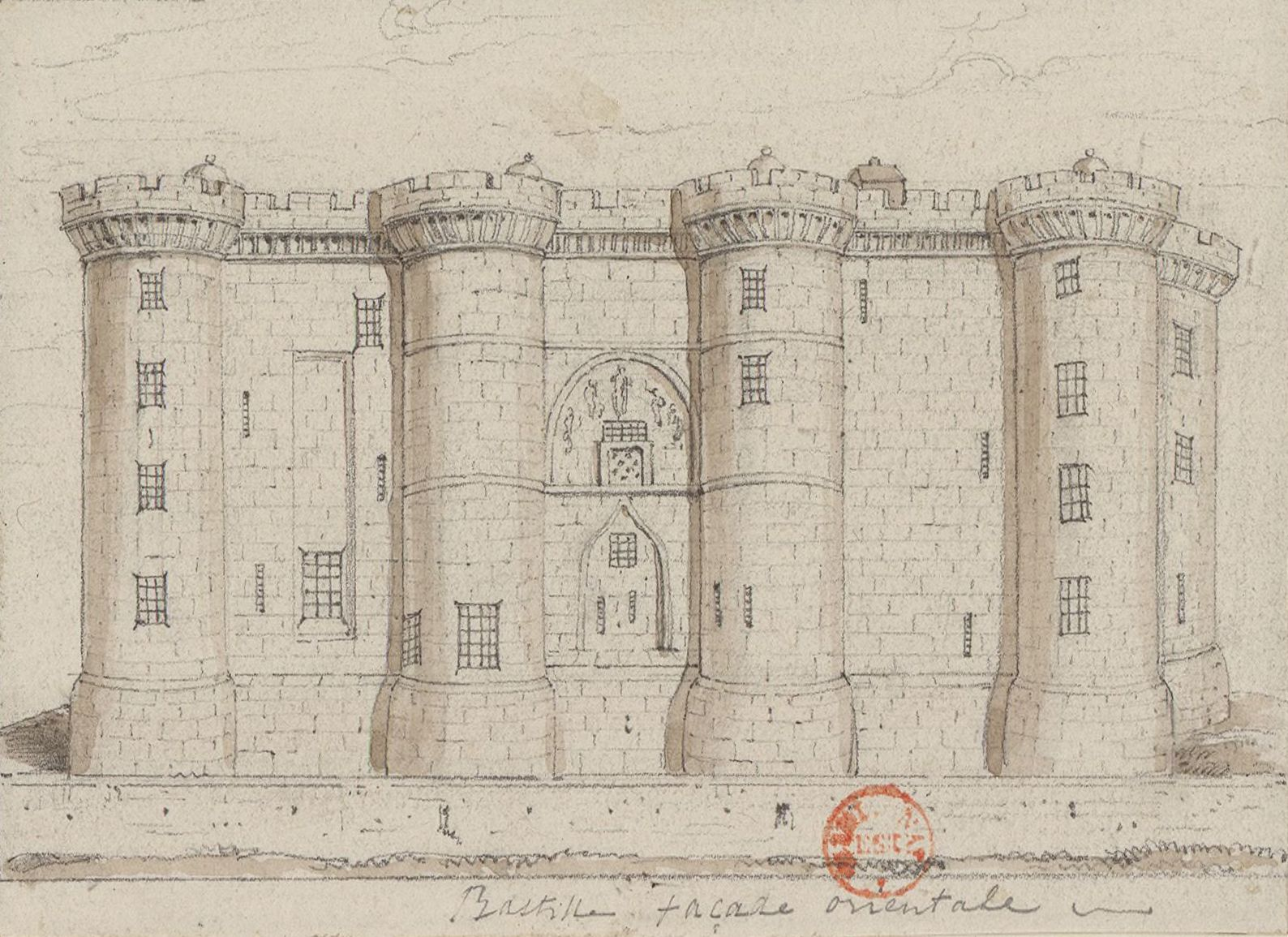
Sketch of the infamous French state prison the Bastille in Paris, where Vanbrugh was incarcerated

From 1686, Vanbrugh was working undercover, playing a role in bringing about the armed invasion by William of Orange, the deposition of James II, and the Glorious Revolution of 1688. He thus demonstrates an intense early identification with the Whig cause of parliamentary democracy, with which he was to remain affiliated all his life. Returning from bringing William messages at The Hague, Vanbrugh was arrested at Calais on a charge of espionage (which Downes concludes was trumped-up) in September 1688, two months before William invaded England. Vanbrugh remained in prison in France for four and a half years, albeit in reasonable comfort. In 1691 he requested to be moved from Calais to Vincennes, at his own expense, where his treatment deteriorated enough to suffice his writing to Louis XIV, leading to his eventual transfer to the Bastille in February 1692. This raised the profile of his case once more, finally prompting his release in November of the same year, in an exchange of political prisoners.

His life is sharply bisected by this prison experience, which he entered at age 24 and emerged from at 29, after having spent, as Downes puts it, half his adult life in captivity. It seems to have left him with a lasting distaste for the French political system but also with a taste for the comic dramatists and the architecture of France.

The often-repeated claim that Vanbrugh wrote part of his comedy The Provoked Wife in the Bastille is based on allusions in a couple of much later memoirs and is regarded with some doubt by modern scholars (see McCormick). After being released from the Bastille, he had to spend three months in Paris, free to move around but unable to leave the country, and with every opportunity to see an architecture "unparalleled in England for scale, ostentation, richness, taste and sophistication". He was allowed to return to England in April 1693; once he returned to England he joined the Navy and took part in an unsuccessful naval attack against the French at Brest. At some point in the mid-1690s, it is not known exactly when, he exchanged army life for London and the London stage.

== Public life ==
=== London ===
Vanbrugh's London career was diverse and varied, comprising playwriting, architectural design, and attempts to combine these two overarching interests. His overlapping achievements and business ventures were sometimes confusing even to Vanbrugh himself.

==== The Kit-Cat Club ====
A committed Whig, Vanbrugh was a member of the Kit-Cat Club – and particularly popular for "his colossal geniality, his great good humour, his easy-going temperament". The Club is best known today as an early 18th-century social gathering point for culturally and politically prominent Whigs, including many artists and writers (William Congreve, Joseph Addison, Godfrey Kneller) and politicians (the Duke of Marlborough, Charles Seymour, the Earl of Burlington, Thomas Pelham-Holles, Sir Robert Walpole and Richard Temple, 1st Viscount Cobham who gave Vanbrugh several architectural commissions at Stowe).

Politically, the Club promoted the Whig objectives of a strong Parliament, a limited monarchy, resistance to France, and primarily the Protestant succession to the throne. Yet the Kit-Cats always presented their club as more a matter of dining and conviviality, and this reputation has been successfully relayed to posterity. Downes suggests, however, that the Club's origins go back to before the Glorious Revolution of 1689 and that its political importance was much greater before it went public in 1700, in calmer and more Whiggish times. Downes proposes a role for an early Kit-Cat grouping in the armed invasion by William of Orange and the Glorious Revolution. Horace Walpole, son of Kit-Cat Sir Robert Walpole, claims that the respectable middle-aged Club members generally mentioned as "a set of wits" were originally "in reality the patriots that saved Britain", in other words were the active force behind the Glorious Revolution itself. Secret groups tend to be poorly documented, and this sketch of the pre-history of the Club cannot be proved but, as we have seen, young Vanbrugh was indeed in 1688 part of a secret network working for William's invasion. If the roots of the Club go back that far, it is tempting to speculate that Vanbrugh in joining the club was not merely becoming one of a convivial London "set of wits" but was also linking up with old friends and co-conspirators. A hero of the cause who had done time in French prison for it, could have been confident of a warm welcome.

==== The Haymarket theatre ====
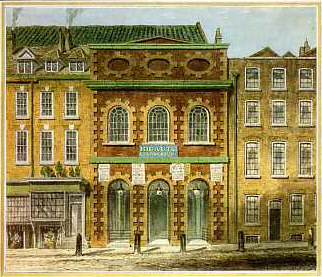
The Queen's Theatre, by William Capon

In 1703, Vanbrugh started buying land and signing backers for the construction of a new theatre, the Queen's Theatre, in Haymarket, designed by himself and managed by Vanbrugh along with Thomas Betterton and his associate William Congreve. It was intended for the use of an actors' cooperative (see The Provoked Wife below) and hoped to improve the chances of legitimate theatre in London. Theatre was under threat from more colourful types of entertainment such as opera, juggling, pantomime (introduced by John Rich), animal acts, travelling dance troupes, and famous visiting Italian singers. They also hoped to make a profit, and Vanbrugh optimistically bought up the actors' company, making himself sole owner. He was now bound to pay salaries to the actors and, as it turned out, to manage the theatre, a notorious tightrope act for which he had no experience. The often repeated rumour that the acoustics of the building Vanbrugh had designed were bad is exaggerated (see Milhous), but the more practical Congreve had become anxious to extricate himself from the project, and Vanbrugh was left spreading himself extremely thin, running a theatre and simultaneously overseeing the building of Blenheim Palace, a project which after June 1705 often took him out of town.

Unsurprisingly under these circumstances, Vanbrugh's management of the Queen's Theatre in Haymarket showed "numerous signs of confusion, inefficiency, missed opportunities, and bad judgment". Having burned his fingers on theatre management, Vanbrugh too extricated himself, expensively, by selling the business in 1708 to Owen Swiny., though without ever collecting much of the putative price. He had put a lot of money, his own and borrowed, into the theatre company, which he was never to recover. It was noted as remarkable by contemporaries that he continued to pay the actors' salaries fully and promptly while they were working for him, just as he always paid the workmen he had hired for construction work; shirking such responsibilities was close to being standard practice in early 18th century England. Vanbrugh himself never seems to have pursued those who owed him money, and throughout his life his finances can at best be described as precarious.

==== The College of Arms ====
Vanbrugh's introduction and advancement in the College of Arms remain controversial. On 21 June 1703 the obsolete office of Carlisle Herald was revived for Vanbrugh. This appointment was followed by a promotion to the post of Clarenceux King of Arms in March 1704. In 1725 he sold this office to Knox Ward, and he told a friend he had "got leave to dispose in earnest, of a place I got in jest". His colleagues' opposition to an ill-gotten appointment ought to have been directed to Lord Carlisle, who as Deputy Earl Marshal, arranged both appointments and against whose wishes they were powerless. Vanbrugh went on to make more friends than enemies at the College, however. The pageantry of state occasions appealed to his theatrical sense, his duties were not difficult, and he appears to have performed them well. In the opinion of a modern herald and historian, although the appointment was "incongruous", he was "possibly the most distinguished man who has ever worn a herald's tabard." In May 1706 Lord Halifax and Vanbrugh – representing the octogenarian Garter King of Arms, Sir Henry St George – led a delegation to Hanover to confer the Order of the Garter on Prince George, later to become King George II. Vaughan Hart has shown how Vanbrugh's interest in arms and heraldry found expression in, and gave meaning to, his architecture.

==== Marriage and death ====
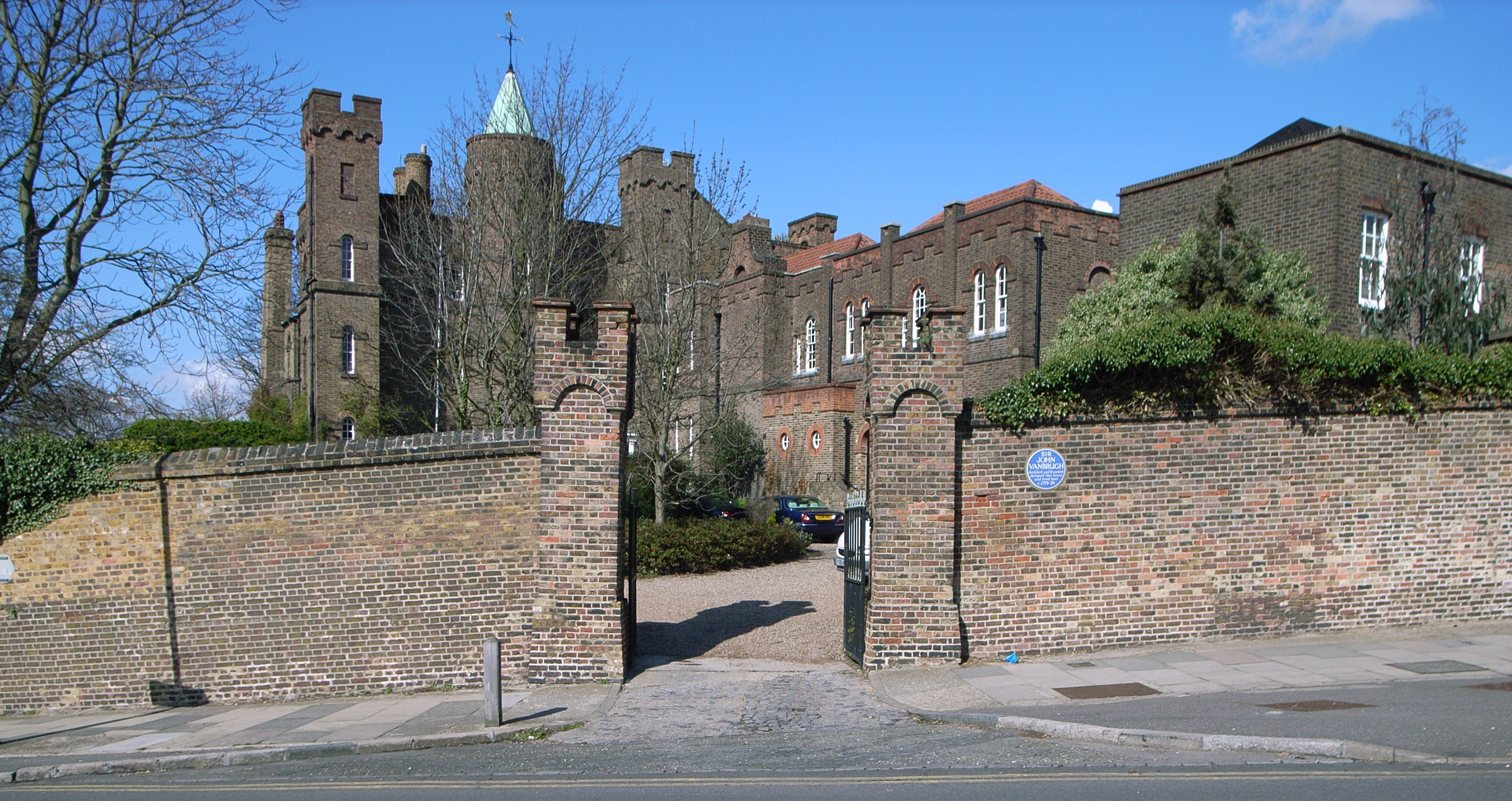
Vanbrugh Castle in Greenwich, south London

In 1719, at St Lawrence's Church, York (since rebuilt), Vanbrugh married Henrietta Maria Yarburgh of Heslington Hall, York, aged 26 to his 55. In spite of the age difference, this was by all accounts a happy marriage, which produced two sons. Unlike that of the rake heroes and fops of his plays, Vanbrugh's personal life was without scandal.

Vanbrugh died "of an asthma" on 26 March 1726, in the modest town house designed by him in 1703 out of the ruins of Whitehall Palace and satirised by Swift as "the goose pie". His married life, however, was mostly spent at Greenwich (then not considered part of London at all) in the house on Maze Hill now known as Vanbrugh Castle, a miniature Scottish tower house designed by Vanbrugh in the earliest stages of his career. A Grade I listed building, and formerly a RAF Boys' School, it is today divided into private apartments.

=== Playwright ===
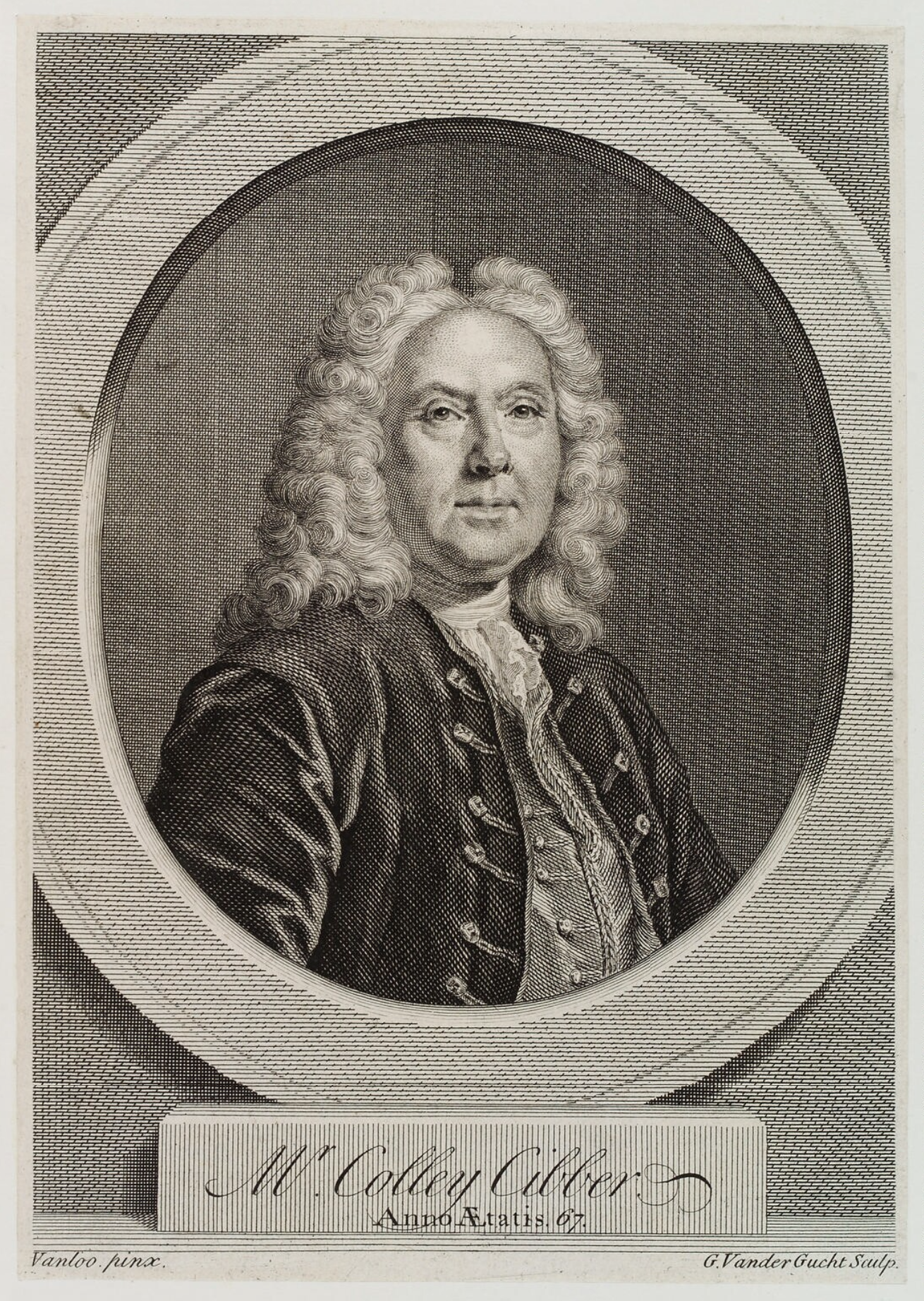
Actor Colley Cibber's comedy Love's Last Shift, or Virtue Rewarded inspired Vanbrugh to write The Relapse, or, Virtue in Danger.

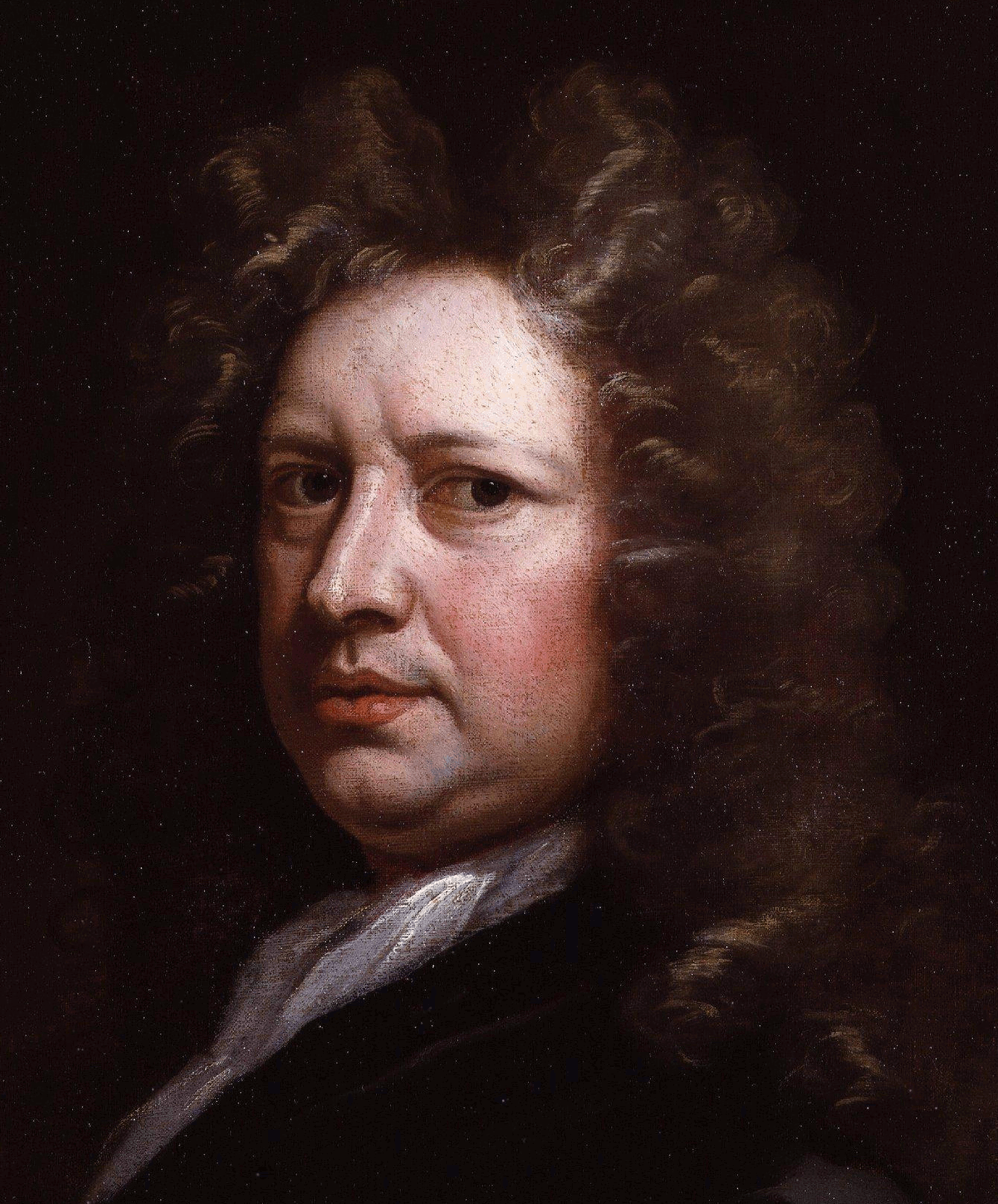
Thomas Betterton, Sir John Brute in The Provoked Wife. Betterton's acting ability was lavishly praised by Samuel Pepys, Alexander Pope, Richard Steele and Colley Cibber.

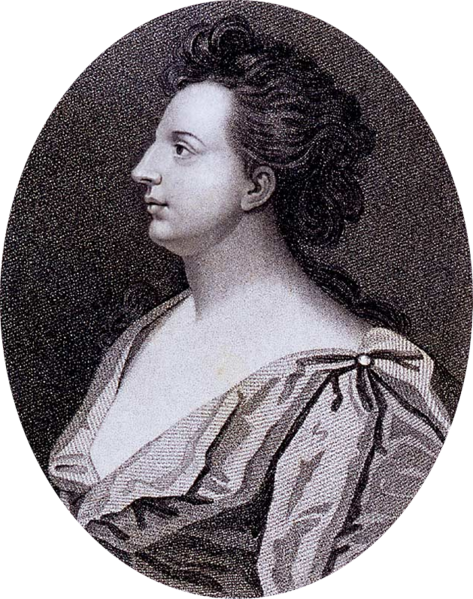
Elizabeth Barry was a celebrated tragedienne who brought depth to Lady Brute in Vanbrugh's comedy The Provoked Wife.

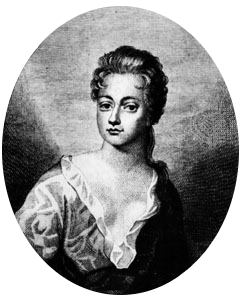
Anne Bracegirdle, Bellinda in The Provoked Wife, often played the comic half of a contrasted tragic/comic heroine pair with Elizabeth Barry.

Vanbrugh arrived in London at a time of scandal and internal drama at London's only theatre company, as a long-running conflict between pinchpenny management and disgruntled actors came to a head and the actors walked out. A new comedy staged with the makeshift remainder of the company in January 1696, Colley Cibber's Love's Last Shift, had a final scene that to Vanbrugh's critical mind demanded a sequel, and even though it was his first play he threw himself into the fray by providing it.

==== The Relapse ====
Cibber's Love's Last Shift Colley Cibber's notorious tear-jerker Love's Last Shift, Or, Virtue Rewarded was written and staged in the eye of a theatrical storm. London's only and mismanaged theatre company, known as the United Company, had split in two in March 1695 when the senior actors began operating their own acting cooperative, and the next season was one of cutthroat rivalry between the two companies.

Cibber, a young actor still employed by the parent company, seized this moment of unique demand for new plays and launched his career on two fronts by writing a play with a big part for himself: the Frenchified fop Sir Novelty Fashion. Backed up by Cibber's own performance, Sir Novelty delighted the audiences. In the tense part of Love's Last Shift, wifely patience is tried by an out-of-control Restoration rake husband, and the wife is celebrated and rewarded in a climactic finale where the cheating husband kneels to her and expresses the depth of his repentance.

Love's Last Shift has not been staged again since the early 18th century and is read only by the most dedicated scholars, who sometimes express distaste for its businesslike combination of four explicit acts of sex and rakishness with one of sententious reform (see Hume). If Cibber indeed was deliberately attempting to appeal simultaneously to rakish and respectable Londoners, it worked: the play was a great box-office hit.

Sequel: The Relapse Vanbrugh's witty sequel The Relapse, Or, Virtue in Danger, offered to the United Company six weeks later, questions the justice of women's position in marriage at this time. He sends new sexual temptations in the way of not only the reformed husband but also the patient wife, and allows them to react in more credible and less predictable ways than in their original context, lending the flat characters from Love's Last Shift a dimension that at least some critics are willing to consider psychological (see Hume).

In a trickster subplot, Vanbrugh provides the more traditional Restoration attraction of an overly well-dressed and exquisite fop, Lord Foppington, a brilliant re-creation of Cibber's Sir Novelty Fashion in Love's Last Shift (Sir Novelty has simply in The Relapse bought himself the title of "Lord Foppington" through the corrupt system of Royal title sales). Critics of Restoration comedy are unanimous in declaring Lord Foppington "the greatest of all Restoration fops" (Dobrée), by virtue of being not merely laughably affected, but also "brutal, evil, and smart" (Hume).

The Relapse, however, came very close to not being performed at all. The United Company had lost all its senior performers, and had great difficulty in finding and keeping actors of sufficient skills for the large cast required by The Relapse. Members of that cast had to be kept from defecting to the rival actors' cooperative, had to be "seduced" (as the legal term was) back when they did defect, and had to be blandished into attending rehearsals which dragged out into ten months and brought the company to the threshold of bankruptcy. "They have no company at all", reported a contemporary letter on 19 November 1696 "and unless a new play comes out on Saturday revives their reputation, they must break". That new play, The Relapse, did turn out a tremendous success that saved the company, not least by virtue of Colley Cibber again bringing down the house with his second impersonation of Lord Foppington. "This play (the Relapse)", writes Cibber in his autobiography forty years later, "from its new and easy Turn of Wit, had great Success".

==== The Provoked Wife ====
Vanbrugh's second original comedy, The Provoked Wife, followed soon after, performed by the rebel actors' company. This play is different in tone from the largely farcical The Relapse, and adapted to the greater acting skills of the rebels. Vanbrugh had good reason to offer his second play to the new company, which had got off to a brilliant start by premièring Congreve's Love for Love, the greatest London box-office success for years. The actors' cooperative boasted the established star performers of the age, and Vanbrugh tailored The Provoked Wife to their specialities. While The Relapse had been robustly phrased to be suitable for amateurs and minor acting talents, he could count on versatile professionals like Thomas Betterton, Elizabeth Barry, and the rising young star Anne Bracegirdle to do justice to characters of depth and nuance.

The Provoked Wife is a comedy, but Elizabeth Barry who played the abused wife was especially famous as a tragic actress, and for her power of "moving the passions", i.e., moving an audience to pity and tears. Barry and the younger Bracegirdle had often worked together as a tragic/comic heroine pair to bring audiences the typically tragic/comic rollercoaster experience of Restoration plays. Vanbrugh takes advantage of this schema and these actresses to deepen audience sympathy for the unhappily married Lady Brute, even as she fires off her witty ripostes. In the intimate conversational dialogue between Lady Brute and her niece Bellinda (Bracegirdle), and especially in the star part of Sir John Brute the brutish husband (Betterton), which was hailed as one of the peaks of Thomas Betterton's remarkable career, The Provoked Wife is something as unusual as a Restoration problem play. The premise of the plot, that a wife trapped in an abusive marriage might consider either leaving it or taking a lover, outraged some sections of Restoration society.

==== Other works ====
- Aesop (1697)
- The False Friend (1702)
- Squire Trelooby (1704)
- The Confederacy (1705)
- The Mistake (1705)

==== Changing audience taste ====
In 1698, Vanbrugh's argumentative and sexually frank plays were singled out for special attention by Jeremy Collier in his Short View of the Immorality and Profaneness of the English Stage, particularly for their failure to impose exemplary morality by appropriate rewards and punishments in the fifth act. Vanbrugh laughed at these charges and published a joking reply, where he accused the clergyman Collier of being more sensitive to unflattering portrayals of the clergy than to real irreligion. However, rising public opinion was already on Collier's side. The intellectual and sexually explicit Restoration comedy style was becoming less and less acceptable to audiences and was soon to be replaced by a drama of sententious morality. Colley Cibber's Love's Last Shift, with its reformed rake and sentimental reconciliation scene, can be seen as a forerunner of this drama.

Although Vanbrugh continued to work for the stage in many ways, he produced no more original plays. With the change in audience taste away from Restoration comedy, he turned his creative energies from original composition to dramatic adaptation/translation, theatre management, and architecture.

=== Architect ===
The precise reasons and motivations behind Vanbrugh's change in career remain unclear, but the decision was sudden enough even to be remarked upon by commentators of his time:

Van's genius, without thought or lecture,
Is hugely turn'd to architecture.

Jonathan Swift, in this quote, suggests that Vanbrugh had no previous training in, nor studied architecture, but applied himself to the discipline whole-heartedly.

As an architect (or surveyor, as the term then was) Vanbrugh is thought to have had no formal training (see "Early life" above). To what extent Vanbrugh's exposure to contemporary French architecture during years of imprisonment in France affected him is hard to gauge, in April 1691 he was transferred to Château de Vincennes in the months he spent as a prisoner there he would have got to know the architect Louis Le Vau's grand classical work (1656–61) in the château well. On his release from prison (he was at the Bastille by then) on 22 November 1692 he spent a short time in Paris, there he would have seen much recent architecture including Les Invalides, the Collège des Quatre-Nations and the east wing of the Louvre Palace. His inexperience was compensated for by his unerring eye for perspective and detail and his close working relationship with Nicholas Hawksmoor. Hawksmoor, a former clerk of Sir Christopher Wren, was to be Vanbrugh's collaborator in many of his most ambitious projects, including Castle Howard and Blenheim. During his almost thirty years as a practising architect, Vanbrugh designed and worked on numerous buildings. More often than not his work was a rebuild or remodel, such as that of Kimbolton Castle, where Vanbrugh had to follow the instructions of his patron. Consequently these houses, which often claim Vanbrugh as their architect, do not best display his own architectural concepts and ideas. In the summer of 1699 as part of his architectural education Vanbrugh made a tour of northern England, writing to Charles Montagu, 1st Duke of Manchester, (he was still an Earl at the time) on Christmas Day of that year: 'I have seen most of the great houses in the North, as Ld Nottings (sic): Duke of Leeds Chattesworth (sic) &C.' This itinerary likely included many of the great Elizabethan houses, including: Burghley House, Wollaton Hall, Hardwick Hall and Bolsover Castle, whose use of towers, complex skylines, bow widows and other features would be reinterpreted in Vanbrugh's own buildings.

Though Vanbrugh is best known in connection with stately houses, the parlous state of London's 18th-century streets did not escape his attention. It was reported in the London Journal of 16 March 1722–23:

"We are informed that Sir John Vanbrugh, in his scheme for new paving the cities of London and Westminster, among other things, proposes a tax on all gentlemen's coaches, to stop all channels in the street, and to carry all the water off by drains and common sewers under ground."

Vanbrugh's chosen style was the baroque, which had been spreading across Europe during the 17th century, promoted by, among others, Bernini and Le Vau. The first baroque country house built in England was Chatsworth House, designed by William Talman three years before Castle Howard. In the contest for the commission of Castle Howard, the untrained and untried Vanbrugh astonishingly managed to out-charm and out-clubman the professional but less socially adept Talman and to persuade the Earl of Carlisle to give the great opportunity to him instead. Seizing it, Vanbrugh instigated European baroque's metamorphosis into a subtle, almost understated version that became known as English baroque. Four of Vanbrugh's designs act as milestones for evaluating this process:

1. Castle Howard, North Yorkshire, commissioned in 1699;
2. Blenheim Palace, Oxfordshire, commissioned in 1704;
3. Kings Weston House, Bristol, begun in 1712;
4. Seaton Delaval Hall, Northumberland, begun in 1718.

Work on each of these projects overlapped with that on the next, providing a natural progression of thoughts and style.

==== Castle Howard ====
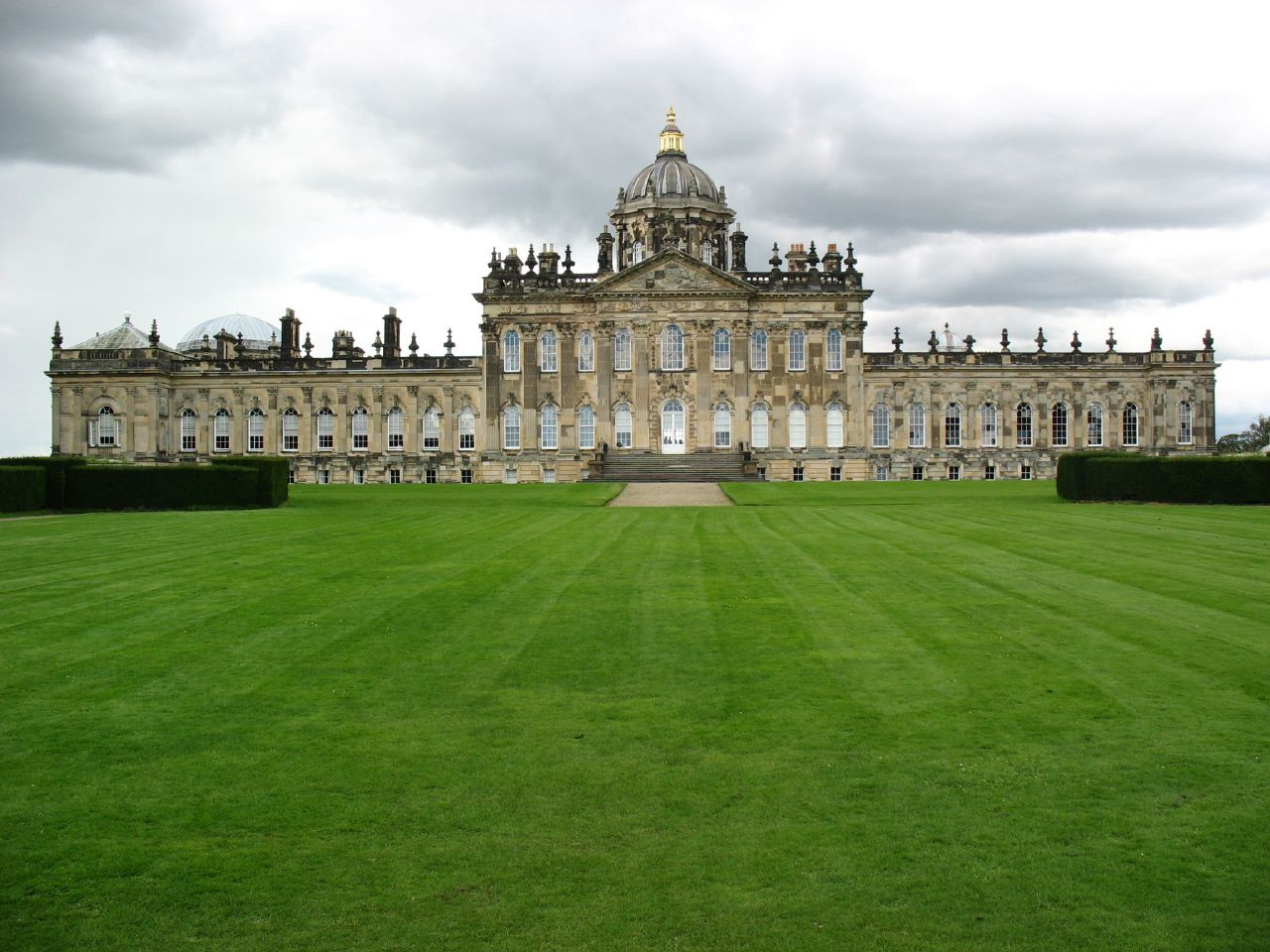
Vanbrugh's south facade of Castle Howard

Charles Howard, 3rd Earl of Carlisle, a fellow member of the Kit-Cat Club, commissioned Vanbrugh in 1699 to design his mansion, often described as England's first truly baroque building. The baroque style at Castle Howard is the most European that Vanbrugh ever used.

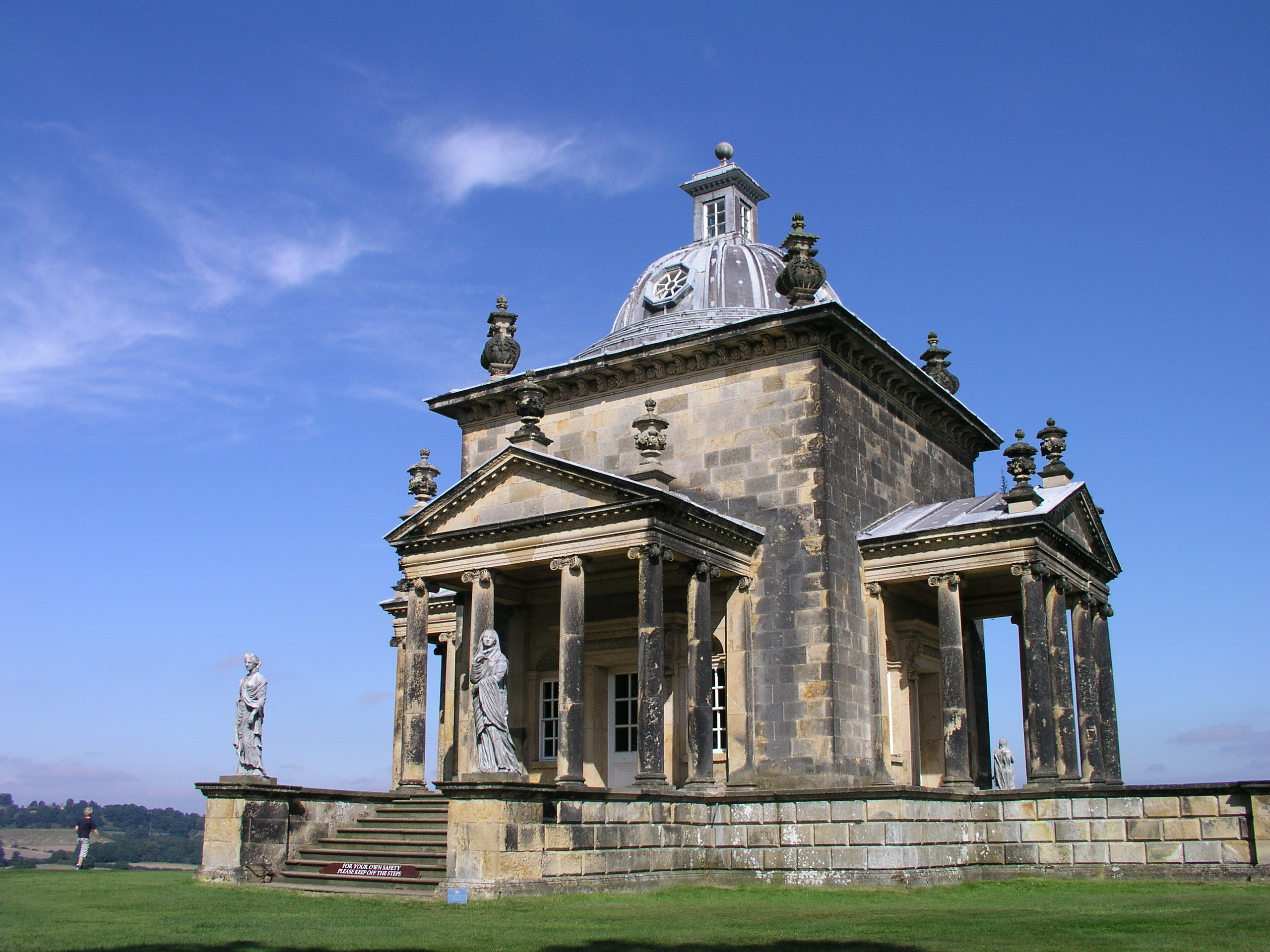
Temple of the Four Winds

Castle Howard, with its immense corridors in segmental colonnades leading from the main entrance block to the flanking wings, its centre crowned by a great domed tower complete with cupola, is very much in the school of classic European baroque. It combined aspects of design that had only appeared occasionally, if at all, in English architecture: John Webb's Greenwich Palace, Wren's unexecuted design for Greenwich, which like Castle Howard was dominated by a domed centre block, and of course Talman's Chatsworth. A possible inspiration for Castle Howard was also Vaux-le-Vicomte in France.

The interiors are extremely dramatic, the Great Hall rising 80 feet (24 m) into the cupola. Scagliola, and Corinthian columns abound, and galleries linked by soaring arches give the impression of an opera stage-set – doubtless the intention of the architect.

Castle Howard was acclaimed a success. This fantastical building, unparalleled in England, with its facades and roofs decorated by pilasters, statuary, and flowing ornamental carving, ensured that baroque became an overnight success. While the greater part of Castle Howard was inhabited and completed by 1709, the finishing touches were to continue for much of Vanbrugh's lifetime. The west wing was finally completed after Vanbrugh's death, to an altered design. The acclaim of the work at Castle Howard led to Vanbrugh's most famous commission, architect for Blenheim Palace.

Regarding the commission, William Talman, an already established architect and Comptroller of the King's Works had initially been the architect of choice, charging more than the Lord had thought reasonable. Vanbrugh's charm, and Talman's lack thereof, may have been enough to convince the patron to change his architect. However, it remains unknown how Vanbrugh, totally untrained and inexperienced, persuaded Earl Carlisle to grant the responsibility of architect to him. The design process began in the summer of 1699, before the end of the year the model for Castle Howard was under construction, stone was being quarried and foundations discussed.

It appears that the early drawings of the design for Castle Howard were made by Nicholas Hawksmoor, and in 1700 he was formally introduced by Vanbrugh into the project as draughtsman and clerk of works. Designs varied and evolved until 1702, the pair working together.

==== Vanbrugh's House ====
In July 1700 the King granted Vanbrugh permission to build on the ruins of Whitehall at his own expense. Brick and stone from the ruins of the Palace of Whitehall were used and the house was sited on what was the Vice-Chamberlain's lodgings. The small, two storied house was unique in design, though its size and proportions led to it being called, unflatteringly, a 'goose-pie' by Swift.

The house was demolished in 1898 to make way for the Old War Office Building.

==== Blenheim Palace ====
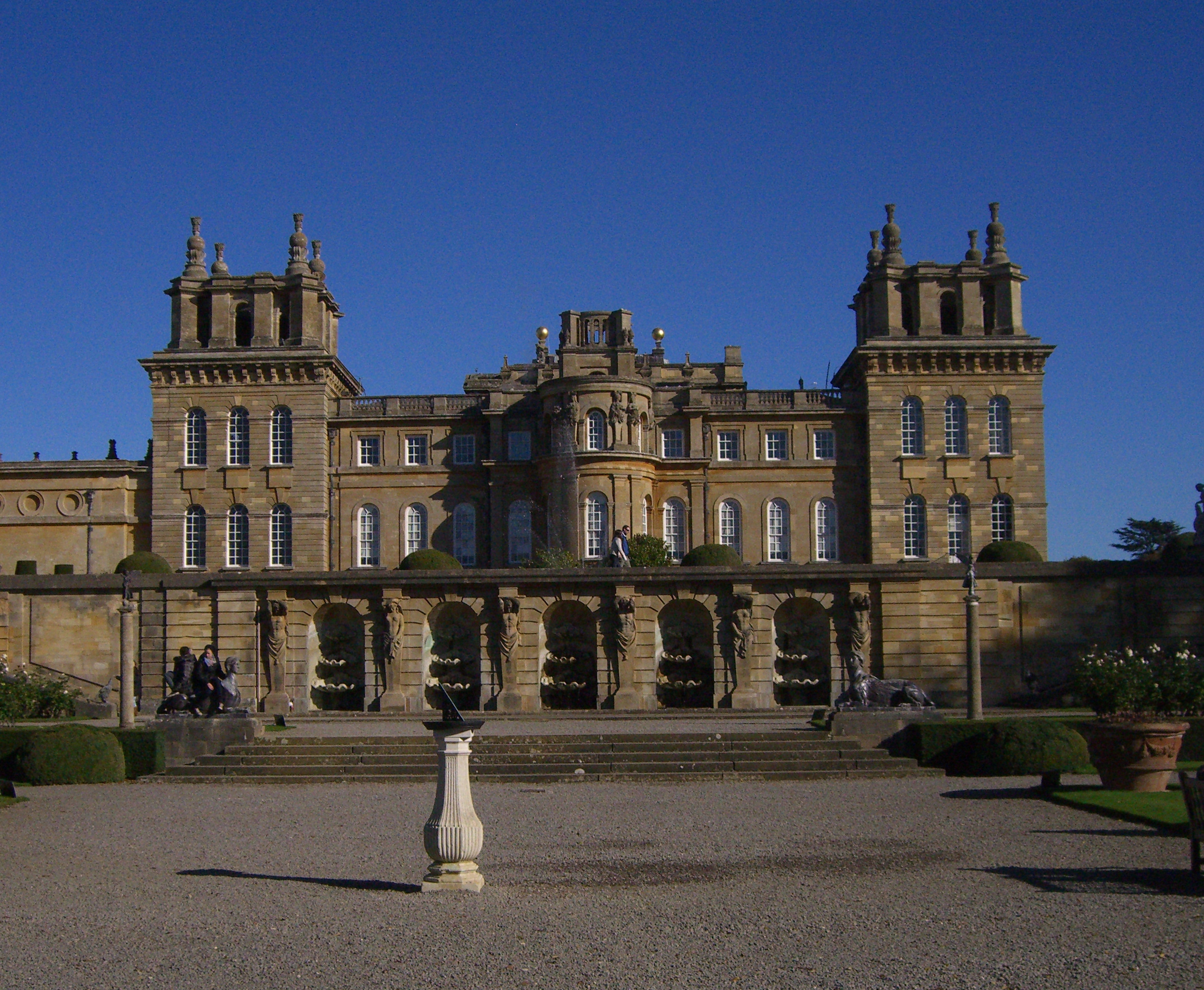
The West facade of Blenheim Palace ("Vanbrugh's castle air") shows the unique severe towering stone belvederes ornamenting the skyline.

The Duke of Marlborough's forces defeated King Louis XIV's army at Blenheim, a village on the Danube in 1704. Marlborough's reward, from a grateful nation, was to be a splendid country seat, and the Duke himself chose fellow Kit-Cat John Vanbrugh to be the architect. Work began on the palace in 1705, though as Vanbrugh wasn't a trained architect he worked alongside Nicholas Hawksmoor on the project.

Blenheim Palace was conceived to be not only a grand country house, but a national monument. Consequently, the light baroque style used at Castle Howard would have been unsuitable for what is in effect a war memorial. It is in truth more of a castle, or citadel, than a palace. As it was designed as a national monument first and a comfortable family home second, Vanbrugh had many arguments with the Duchess who wanted the Palace to be a comfortable country house for her family, I made Mr. Vanbrugh my enemy by the constant disputes I had with him to prevent his extravagance As a result of these arguments Vanbrugh resigned before the palace was completed in November 1716.You have your end Madam, for I will never trouble you more Unless the Duke of Marlborough recovers so far, to shelter me from such intolerable Treatment.

The qualities of the building are best illustrated by the massive East Gate (illustration, below, left), set in the curtain wall of the service block, it has been described as resembling an impregnable entrance to a walled city. The gate, its tapering walls creating an illusion of greater height, also serves as water tower for the palace, thus confounding those of Vanbrugh's critics, such as the Duchess, who accused him of impracticability.

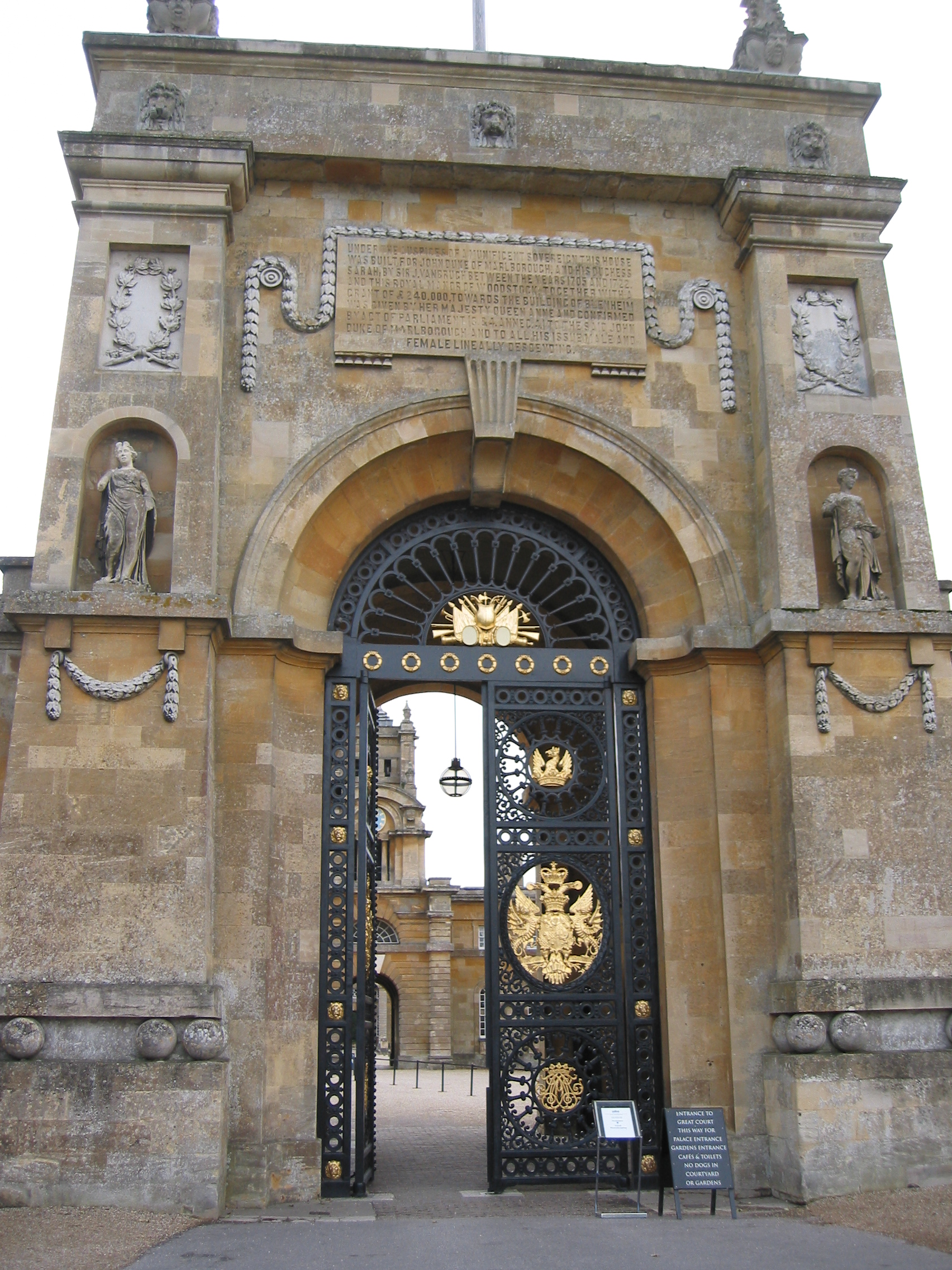
Vanbrugh's monumental East Gate at Blenheim Palace is more the entrance to a citadel than to a palace. Vanbrugh cunningly slightly tapered the sides to create an illusion of even greater height and drama.

Blenheim, the largest non-royal domestic building in England, consists of three blocks, the centre containing the living and state rooms, and two flanking rectangular wings both built around a central courtyard: one contains the stables, and the other the kitchens, laundries, and storehouses. If Castle Howard was the first truly baroque building in England, then Blenheim Palace is the most definitive. While Castle Howard is a dramatic assembly of restless masses, Blenheim is altogether of a more solid construction, relying on tall slender windows and monumental statuary on the roofs to lighten the mass of yellow stone.

The suite of state rooms placed on the piano nobile were designed to be overpowering and magnificent displays, rather than warm, or comfortable. Cosy, middle class comfort was not the intention at Versailles, the great palace of Marlborough's foe, and it was certainly not deemed a consideration in the palace built to house the conqueror of Versailles' master.

As was common in the 18th century, personal comfort was sacrificed to perspective. Windows were to adorn the facades, as well as light the interior. Blenheim was designed as a theatre piece both externally and also from the 67 foot (20 m) high great hall, leading to the huge frescoed saloon, all designed on an axis with the 134 foot (41 m) high column of victory in the grounds, with the trees planted in the battle positions of Marlborough's soldiers. Over the south portico (illustrated right), itself a massive and dense construction of piers and columns, definitely not designed in the Palladian manner for elegant protection from the sun, a huge bust of Louis XIV is forced to look down on the splendours and rewards of his conqueror. Whether this placement and design was an ornamental feature created by Vanbrugh, or an ironic joke by Marlborough, is not known. However, as an architectural composition it is a unique example of baroque ornament.

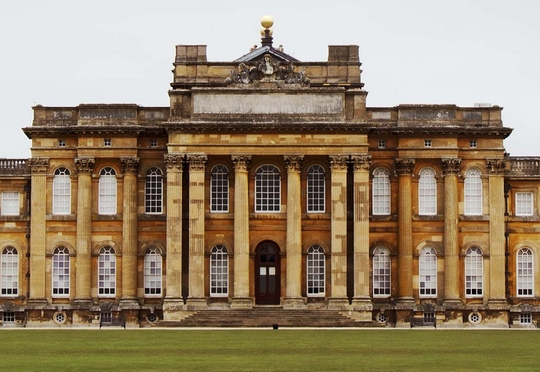
The pediment over the south portico is a complete break from the convention. The flat top is decorated by a trophy bearing the marble bust of Louis XIV looted by Marlborough from Tournai in 1709, weighing 30 tons. The positioning of the bust was an innovative new design in the decoration of a pediment.

At Blenheim, Vanbrugh developed baroque from the mere ornamental to a denser, more solid, form, where the massed stone became the ornament. The great arched gates and the huge solid portico were ornament in themselves, and the whole mass was considered rather than each facade. As the palace is still treated as an important part of English heritage, it became a World Heritage Site in 1987.

==== Kings Weston House ====
Kings Weston House in Bristol was built between 1712 and 1719 for Edward Southwell on the site of an earlier Tudor house. A significant architectural feature is the grouping of all the chimneys into a massive arcade. The Kings Weston estate possesses one of the largest collections of buildings designed by Sir John Vanbrugh in the UK. Whilst the house and the majority of the estate buildings are still standing others have been demolished or been heavily altered. Bristol is the only UK city outside London to possess buildings designed by Vanbrugh.

On 29 April Edward Southwell wrote in his journal at Kings Weston, "Upwards of 60 men preparing stones and digging the foundation of the new house," and on 16 June 1712 work formally began on building the new house by John Vanbrugh. His client, Edward Southwell, did not desire a house on a monumental scale. The result was one of Vanbrugh's smaller houses. It is also his severest in style, obtaining high architectural drama by the well judged disposition of elements that are few in number, and simple in their nature. The exterior of the house would have been at the point of completion in 1717, the date on the contract for one of the parapet vases. The interior would have been virtually complete by 1719, when the design for inlay on the stair landings was drawn up. Two of the façades have since been remodelled, by Robert Mylne, who remodelled the interior in the 1760s. The stone, which was quarried on the site, was originally ochre in colour but has weathered to an orange-pink.

The arcade formed by linking the chimneys, which rises above the roof, is a notable external feature of the building, reminiscent of the belvederes of Blenheim Palace and producing a 'castle air'.[18] It is square in shape and open on the northeast. The current structure is the result of a rebuilding in 1968, using Bath Stone.

The entrance front, on the southwest, has a centre containing six Corinthian pilasters, with those at each side paired to produce three bays, each of which contains a round arched window. The pediment has a central lunette, and each side consists of two bays in which the windows have wide flat surrounds. There are four parapet vases. The steps originally had low flank walls perpendicular to the facade, which were removed in the later remodelling.

On the southeast facade, the centre has a Doric temple front with open pediment, which surrounds the doorway. The centre has an attic as its upper storey, topped by a blocking course with scrolled supports at each end. A design with a pediment was prepared for this front, but is thought never to have been built. Though the only decoration is the rustication on the Doric temple's pilasters, a remarkably rich effect is achieved.

The northeast and northwest facades of Vanbrugh's original design were entirely undecorated, and a consequent lack of popular appeal may be the reason why they were largely destroyed in later remodelling.

Vanbrugh's northwest facade consisted of a single flat surface, in which a Venetian window on each floor filled the central space between two shallow projections. Perhaps to improve the view down to Avonmouth, the centre was remodelled by Mylne with a canted bay window, at odds with the tautness of Vanbrugh's overall design of the house, in which all planes were parallel or perpendicular to the walls. On the northeast the wall was moved forward during nineteenth-century remodelling, destroying an aesthetically significant alignment between wall projections and the break in the roof arcade, which had been present in Vanbrugh's design.

==== Seaton Delaval Hall ====
Seaton Delaval Hall was Vanbrugh's final work, this northern, seemingly rather bleak country house is considered his finest architectural masterpiece; by this stage in his architectural career Vanbrugh was a master of baroque, he had taken this form of architecture not only beyond the flamboyant continental baroque of Castle Howard, but also past the more severe but still decorated Blenheim. Ornament was almost disguised: a recess or a pillar was not placed for support, but to create a play of light or shadow. The silhouette of the building was of equal, if not greater, importance than the interior layout. In every aspect of the house, subtlety was the keyword.

Built between 1718 and 1728 for Admiral George Delaval, it replaced the existing house on the site. It is possible that the design of Seaton Delaval was influenced by Palladio's Villa Foscari (sometimes known as "La Malcontenta"), built circa 1555. Both have rusticated facades and similar demilune windows over a non-porticoed entrance. Even the large attic gable at Villa Foscari hints at the clerestory of Seaton's great hall.

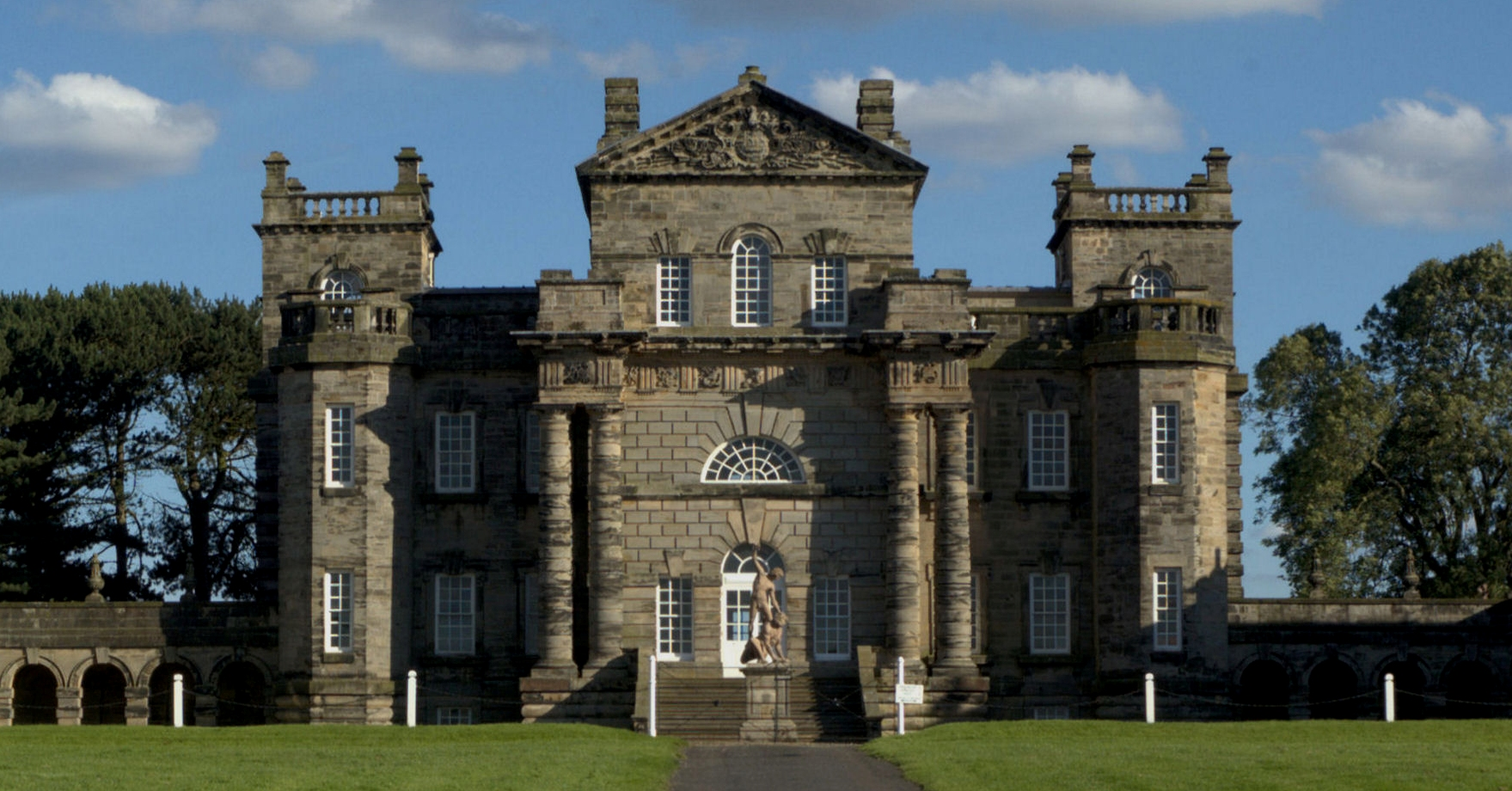
Seaton Delaval Hall – central block viewed from the north

The design concept Vanbrugh drew up was similar to that employed at Castle Howard and Blenheim: a corps de logis between two flanking wings. At Seaton Delaval the wings have a centre projection of three bays, crowned by pediment, either side of which are 7 bays of sash windows above a ground floor arcade. However, Seaton Delaval was to be on a much smaller scale. Work began in 1718 and continued for ten years. The building is an advancement on the style of Blenheim, rather than the earlier Castle Howard. The principal block, or corps de logis, containing, as at Blenheim and Castle Howard, the principal state and living room, forms the centre of a three-sided court. Towers crowned by balustrades and pinnacles give the house something of what Vanbrugh called his castle air.

Seaton Delaval is one of the few houses Vanbrugh designed alone without the aid of Nicholas Hawksmoor. The sobriety of their joint work has sometimes been attributed to Hawksmoor, and yet Seaton Delaval is a very sombre house indeed. Whereas Castle Howard could successfully be set down in Dresden or Würzburg, the austerity and solidity of Seaton Delaval firmly belongs in Northumberland landscape. Vanbrugh, in the final stage in his career, was fully liberated from the rules of the architects of a generation earlier. The rustic stonework is used for the entire facade, including on the entrance facade, the pairs of twin columns supporting little more than a stone cornice. The twin columns are severe and utilitarian, and yet ornament, as they provide no structural use. This is part of the furtive quality of the baroque of Seaton Delaval: the ornamental appears as a display of strength and mass.

The likewise severe, but perfectly proportioned, garden facade has at its centre a four-columned, balcony-roofed portico. Here the slight fluting of the stone columns seems almost excessive ornament. As at Blenheim, the central block is dominated by the raised clerestory of the great hall, adding to the drama of the building's silhouette, but unlike Vanbrugh's other great houses, no statuary decorates the roof-scape here. The decoration is provided solely by a simple balustrade hiding the roof line, and chimneys disguised as finials to the balustrading of the low towers. The massing of the stone, the colonnades of the flanking wings, the heavy stonework and intricate recesses all create light and shade which is ornament in itself.

Among architects, only Vanbrugh could have taken for his inspiration one of Palladio's masterpieces, and while retaining the humanist values of the building, alter and adapt it, into a unique form of baroque unseen elsewhere in Europe.

==== Architectural reputation ====
Vanbrugh's prompt success as an architect can be attributed to his friendships with the influential of the day. No less than five of his architectural patrons were fellow members of the Kit-Cat Club. In 1702, through the influence of Charles Howard, Earl of Carlisle, Vanbrugh was appointed Comptroller of the King's Works. This entitled him to a house at Hampton Court Palace, which he let out. In 1703, he was appointed commissioner of Greenwich Hospital, which was under construction at this time, and succeeded Wren as the official architect (or Surveyor), while Hawksmoor was appointed Site Architect. Vanbrugh's small but conspicuous final changes to the nearly completed building were considered a fine interpretation of Wren's original plans and intentions. Thus what was intended as an infirmary and hostel for destitute retired sailors was transformed into a magnificent national monument. His work here is said to have impressed both Queen Anne and her government, and is directly responsible for his subsequent success.

Vanbrugh's reputation still suffers from accusations of extravagance, impracticability and a bombastic imposition of his own will on his clients. Ironically, all of these unfounded charges derive from Blenheim – Vanbrugh's selection as architect of Blenheim was never completely popular. The Duchess, the formidable Sarah Churchill, particularly wanted Sir Christopher Wren. However, eventually a warrant signed by the Earl of Godolphin, the parliamentary treasurer, appointed Vanbrugh, and outlined his remit. Sadly, nowhere did this warrant mention Queen, or Crown. This error provided the get-out clause for the state when the costs and political infighting escalated.

Blenheim Palace The great court, and state entrance to the palace. The Duchess of Marlborough felt the building was extravagant.

Though Parliament had voted funds for the building of Blenheim, no exact sum had ever been fixed upon, and certainly no provision had been made for inflation. Almost from the outset, funds had been intermittent. Queen Anne paid some of them, but with growing reluctance and lapses, following her frequent altercations with her one time best friend, Sarah, Duchess of Marlborough. After the Duchess's final argument with the Queen in 1712, all state money ceased and work came to a halt. £220,000 had already been spent and £45,000 was owing to workmen. The Marlboroughs went into exile on the continent, and did not return until after Queen Anne's death in 1714.

The day after the Queen's death the Marlboroughs returned, and were reinstated in favour at the court of the new King George I. The 64-year-old Duke now decided to complete the project at his own expense; in 1716 work restarted and Vanbrugh was left to rely entirely upon the means of the Duke of Marlborough himself. Already discouraged and upset by the reception the palace was receiving from the Whig factions, the final blow for Vanbrugh came when the Duke was incapacitated in 1717 by a severe stroke, and the thrifty (and hostile) Duchess took control. The Duchess blamed Vanbrugh entirely for the growing extravagance of the palace, and its general design: that her husband and government had approved them, she discounted. (In fairness to her, it must be mentioned that the Duke of Marlborough had contributed £60,000 to the initial cost, which, supplemented by Parliament, should have built a monumental house.) Following a meeting with the Duchess, Vanbrugh left the building site in a rage, insisting that the new masons, carpenters and craftsmen were inferior to those he had employed. The master craftsmen he had patronised, however, such as Grinling Gibbons, refused to work for the lower rates paid by the Marlboroughs. The craftsmen brought in by the Duchess, under the guidance of furniture designer James Moore, completed the work in perfect imitation of the greater masters, so perhaps there was fault and intransigence on both sides in this famed argument.

Vanbrugh was deeply distressed by the turn of events. The rows and resulting rumours had damaged his reputation, and the palace he had nurtured like a child was forbidden to him. In 1719, while the duchess was "not at home", Vanbrugh was able to view the palace in secret; but when he and his wife, with the Earl of Carlisle, visited the completed Blenheim as members of the viewing public in 1725, they were refused admission to even enter the park. The palace had been completed by Nicholas Hawksmoor.

That Vanbrugh's work at Blenheim has been the subject of criticism can largely be blamed on those, including the Duchess, who failed to understand the chief reason for its construction: to celebrate a martial triumph. In the achievement of this remit, Vanbrugh was as triumphant as was Marlborough on the field of battle.

After Vanbrugh's death Abel Evans suggested this as his epitaph:

Under this stone, reader, survey
Dead Sir John Vanbrugh's house of clay.
Lie heavy on him, Earth! For he
Laid many heavy loads on thee!

Vanbrugh was buried in the church of St Stephen Walbrook in the City of London, but his grave is unmarked and the above epitaph is as yet unused.

Throughout the Georgian period reaction to Vanbrugh's architecture varied. Voltaire, who visited Blenheim Palace in the autumn of 1727, described it as 'a great mass of stone with neither charm nor taste' and thought that if the apartments 'were but as spacious as the walls thick, the house would be commodious enough'.

In a letter dated 10 March 1740, the German Jacob Friedrich, Baron Bielfeld had this to say about Vanbrugh:

This building (Blenheim) has been severely censured, and I agree that it is not entirely exempt from rational censure as it is too much loaded with columns and other heavy ornaments. But if we consider that Sir John Vanbrugh was to construct a building of endless duration, that no bounds were set to expense, and that an edifice was required that should strike with awe and surprise even at a distance; the architect may be excused for having sacrificed, in some degree, the elegance of design to multiplicity of ornament. All the several parts are moreover exactly calculated, all the rules of art are well observed, and this immense fabric reminds us, on the first glance, of the majesty and state of those of Greece and ancient Rome. When we behold it a distance, it appears not as a single palace, but as an entire city. We arrive at it by a stately bridge of a single arch, and which is itself a masterpiece of architecture. I have contracted a very intimate friend ship with the son of Sir John Vanbrugh, who has lately obtained a company in the foot guards, and is a young gentleman of real merit. He has shown me, not only all the designs of his father, but also two houses of his building, one near Whitehall, and the other at Greenwich. They are indeed mere models of houses, but notwithstanding their confined situation, there are everywhere traces of a master to be discovered in their execution. The vulgar critic finds too many columns and ornaments; but the true connoisseur sees that all these ornaments are accompanied with utility, and that an inventive genius is visible in every part. This architect was likewise author of several comedies, which are indeed written in a style that is rather licentious, but at the same time are resplendent with wit and vivacity. So true it is, that genius is not confined to one subject, but wherever exercised, is equally manifest.

In 1766 Lord Stanhope described the Roman amphitheatre at Nîmes as 'Ugly and clumsy enough to have been the work of Vanbrugh if it had been in England.' In 1772 Horace Walpole described Castle Howard thus:

Nobody had informed me that I should at one view see a palace, a town, a fortified city, temples on high places, woods worthy of being each a metropolis of the Druids, vales connected to hills by other woods, the noblest lawn in the world fenced by half the horizon, and a mausoleum that would tempt one to be buried alive; in short I have seen gigantic places before, but never a sublime one.'

Walpole was not as complimentary of Blenheim, describing it as 'execrable within, without & almost all round' and went on 'a quarry of stone that looked at a distance like a great house'. In 1773 Robert Adam and James Adam in the preface to their Works in Architecture wrote that:

Sir John Vanbrugh's genius was of the first class; and, in point of movement, novelty and ingenuity, his works have not been exceeded by anything in modern times. We should certainly quote Blenheim and Castle Howard as great examples of these perfections in preference to any work of our own, or of any other modern architect; but unluckily for the reputation of this excellent artist, his taste kept no pace with his genius, and his works are so crowded with barbarisms and absurdities, and so born down by their own preposterous weight, that none but the discerning can separate their merits from their defects. In the hands of the ingenious artist, who knows how to polish and refine and bring them into use, we have always regarded his productions as rough jewels of inestimable value'.

In 1786 Sir Joshua Reynolds wrote in his 13th Discourse '...in the buildings of Vanbrugh, who was a poet as well as an architect, there is a greater display of imagination, than we shall find perhaps in any other.' In 1796 Uvedale Price described Blenheim as 'uniting in one building the beauty and magnificence of Grecian architecture, the picturesqueness of the Gothic, and the massive grandeur of a castle.' In his fifth Royal Academy lecture of 1810, Sir John Soane said that 'By studying his works the artist will acquire a bold flight of irregular fancy', calling him 'the Shakespeare of architects'. Sir Robert Smirke was less complimentary 'Heaviness was the lightest of (Vanbrugh's) faults... The Italian style...which he contrived to caricature...is apparent in all his works; he helped himself liberally to its vices, contributed many of his own, and by an unfortunate misfortune adding impurity to that which was already greatly impure, left it disgusting and often odious'. Charles Robert Cockerell had this to say about Castle Howard: "great play & charm in Hall. I could not leave it. Vast effect, movement in staircases &c. good effect of long passages on entering."

== Legacy ==
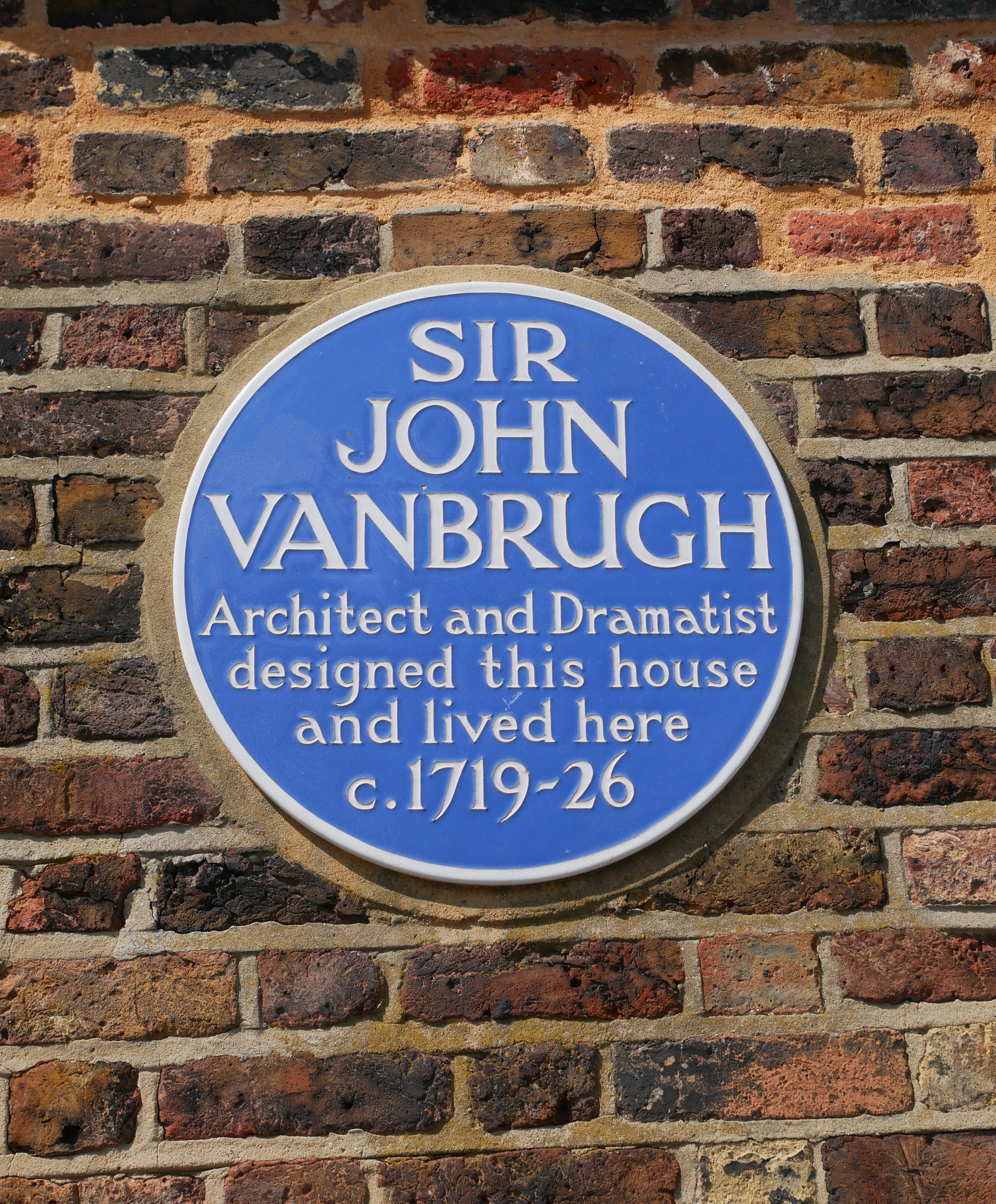
Blue plaque for Vanbrugh at his home in Greenwich

Vanbrugh is remembered today for his vast contribution to British culture, theatre, and architecture. An immediate dramatic legacy was found among his papers after his sudden death, the three-act comedy fragment A Journey to London. Vanbrugh had told his old friend Colley Cibber that he intended in this play to question traditional marriage roles even more radically than in the plays of his youth, and end it with a marriage falling irreconcilably apart. The unfinished manuscript, today available in Vanbrugh's Collected Works, depicts a country family travelling to London and falling prey to its sharpers and temptations, while a London wife drives her patient husband to despair with her gambling and her consorting with the demi-monde of con men and half-pay officers. As with The Relapse at the outset of Vanbrugh's dramatic career, Colley Cibber again became involved, and this time he had last word. Cibber, now a successful actor-manager, completed Vanbrugh's manuscript under the title of The Provoked Husband (1728) and gave it a happy and sententious ending in which the provocative wife repents and is reconciled: a eulogy of marriage which was the opposite of Vanbrugh's declared intention to end his last and belated "Restoration comedy" with marital break-up. Cibber considered this projected outcome to be "too severe for Comedy".

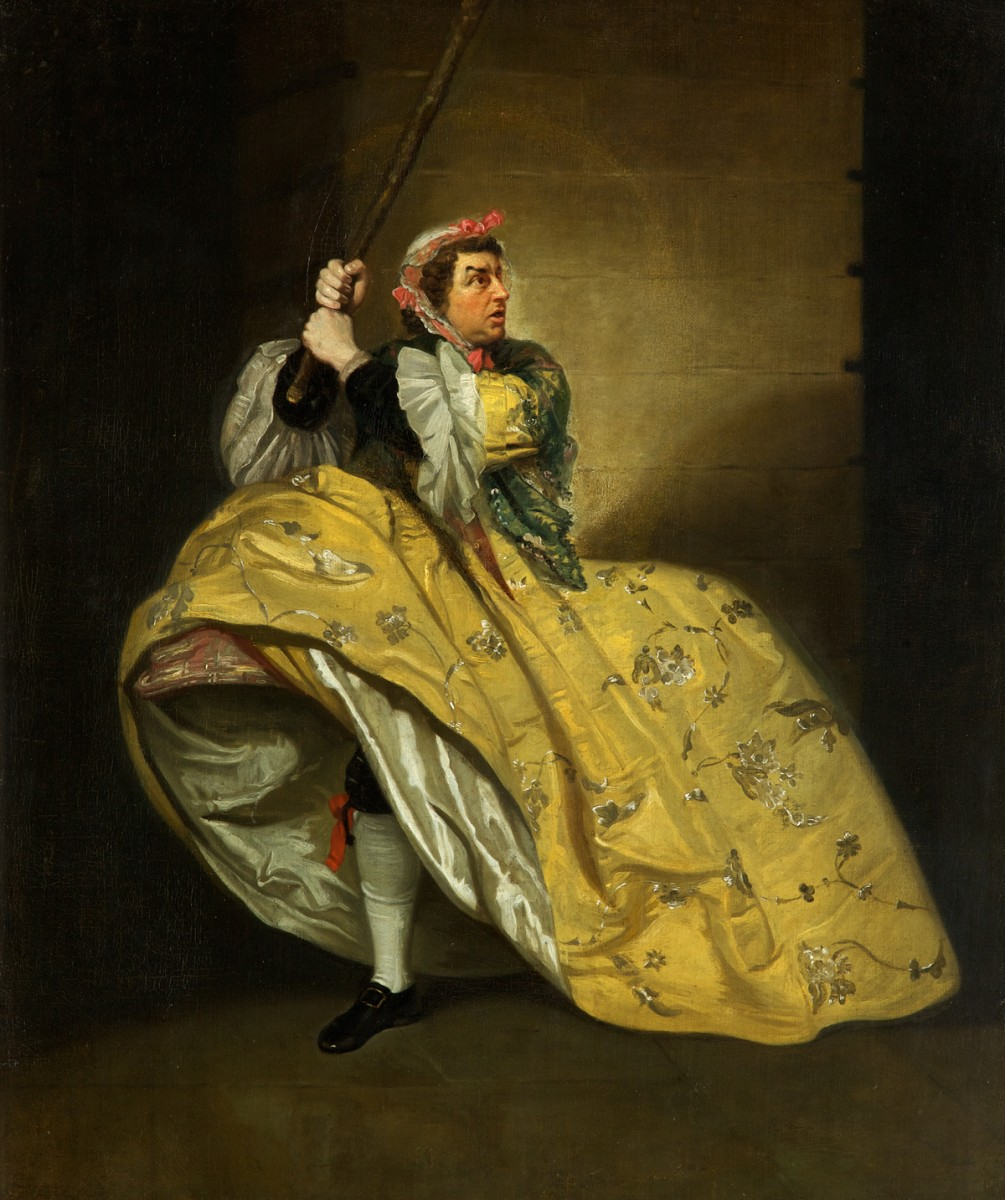
David Garrick in The Provoked Wife by Johann Zoffany, 1763. The role of Sir John Brute in The Provoked Wife became one of David Garrick's most famous roles.

On the 18th-century stage, Vanbrugh's Relapse and Provoked Wife were only considered possible to perform in bowdlerised versions, but as such, they remained popular. Throughout Colley Cibber's long and successful acting career, audiences continued to demand to see him as Lord Foppington in The Relapse, while Sir John Brute in The Provoked Wife became, after being an iconic role for Thomas Betterton, one of David Garrick's most famous roles.

With the completion of Castle Howard, English baroque came into fashion overnight. It had brought together the isolated and varied instances of monumental design, by, among others, Inigo Jones and Christopher Wren. Vanbrugh thought of masses, volume and perspective in a way that his predecessors had not.

He was adept at delivering buildings for his clients, that successfully met their requirements. His reputation has suffered because of his famed disagreements with the Duchess of Marlborough, yet, one must remember his original client was the British Nation, not the Duchess, and the nation wanted a monument and celebration of victory, and that is what Vanbrugh gave the nation.

Nicholas Hawksmoor, Vanbrugh's friend and collaborator on so many projects continued to design many London churches for ten years after Vanbrugh's death. Vanbrugh's pupil and cousin the architect Edward Lovett Pearce rose to become one of Ireland's greatest architects. His influence in Yorkshire can also be seen in the work of the amateur architect William Wakefield, who designed several buildings in the county that show Vanbrugh's influence.

Vanbrugh is commemorated throughout Britain, by inns, street names, a university college (York) and schools named in his honour. His architectural works have been described as "the architectural equivalent of the heroic play, theatrical, grandiose, a dramatic grouping of restless masses with little reference to function."

== Arms ==
Coat of arms of John Vanbrugh
| Adopted 24 April 1714 Crest From a bridge of 3 arches reversed or, a demi-lion argent. Escutcheon Quarterly, (1 & 4) gules, on a fess or 3 barrulets vert, in chief a demi-lion argent issuing from the fess (Vanbrugh); (2 & 3) argent, on a bend sable 3 voided lozenges argent (Carleton). |

== See also ==
- List of works by John Vanbrugh

== Citations ==
Court offices
| Preceded by William Talman | Comptroller of the King's Works; 1702–1726 | Succeeded by Thomas Ripley |
