= List of works by John Vanbrugh =

John Vanbrugh created many disparate works, and this is a list of many of the notable ones.

- Castle Howard, c. 1699 (west wing designed by Sir Thomas Robinson only completed in early 19th century).
- The architect's own house in Whitehall, 1700–1701, known as "Goose-Pie House", demolished 1898.
- The Orangery, Kensington Palace, 1704: probably a modification by Vanbrugh to a design by Hawksmoor.
- Haymarket Theatre, 1704–05, has been completely rebuilt since and is now known as His Majesty's.
- Blenheim Palace, 1705–1722, stable court never completed.
- Grand Bridge, Blenheim, 1708–1722.
- Kimbolton Castle, 1708–1719, remodelled the building.
- Demolished part of Audley End and designed new Grand Staircase, 1708.
- Claremont House, 1708, then known as Chargate (rebuilt to the designs of Henry Holland in the 18th century).
- Kings Weston House, 1710–1714.
- Grimsthorpe Castle, 1715–1730, only the north side of the courtyard was rebuilt.
- Eastbury Park, 1713–1738, completed by Roger Morris who amended Vanbrugh's design (demolished except for Kitchen Wing).
- Cholmondeley Castle 1713 Vanbrugh prepared a design to rebuild the house, but it is believed not to have been executed
- The Obelisk, Castle Howard 1714
- Morpeth Town Hall, 1714. (Front renewed and back replaced in 1869–70.)
- The Belvedere, Claremont Landscape Garden, 1715.
- Vanbrugh Castle, 1718–19, the architect's own house in Greenwich. Additionally, houses for other members of Vanbrugh's family (none of which survived beyond 1910).
- Stowe, Buckinghamshire, c.1719, added north portico, also several temples and follies in the gardens (the surviving follies are: the Wolfe Obelisk (c.1720), relocated 1759; the Rotunda (1720–21) dome altered; the Lake Pavilions (c.1719) altered) up until his death.
- The Temple, Eastbury Park (early 1720s) demolished
- Robin Hood's Well, Yorkshire C.1720
- The Dairies (east house), c.1720
- Seaton Delaval Hall, 1720–1728.
- Lumley Castle, 1722, remodelling work.
- Pyramid Gate, Castle Howard 1723
- Walled Kitchen Garden, Claremont (c.1723)
- Newcastle Pew, St George's Church, Esher, 1724.
- The Bagnio (water pavilion), Eastbury Park (1725) demolished
- Temple of the Four Winds, Castle Howard, 1725–1728.

Attributed works include:

- Completion of State rooms, Hampton Court Palace, 1716–1718.
- Ordnance Board Building, Woolwich, 1716–1720.
- Chatham Dockyard Great Store House 1717, now demolished, Vanburgh or Hawksmoor were possibly involved in the design
- Berwick Barracks, 1717–1721. (Note: Described as a misattribution in Grundy et al., Northumberland, pp. 74, 178–79. Grundy et al. attribute the design to Hawksmoor, saying that this was probably modified in execution by Andrews Jelfe.)
- The Brewhouse, Kings Weston House (c.1718)
- Chatham Dockyard Main gate 1720, is possibly by Vanburgh or Hawksmoor
- Loggia, Kings Weston House (c.1722)

== Gallery of architectural work ==
Vanbrugh's architectural work
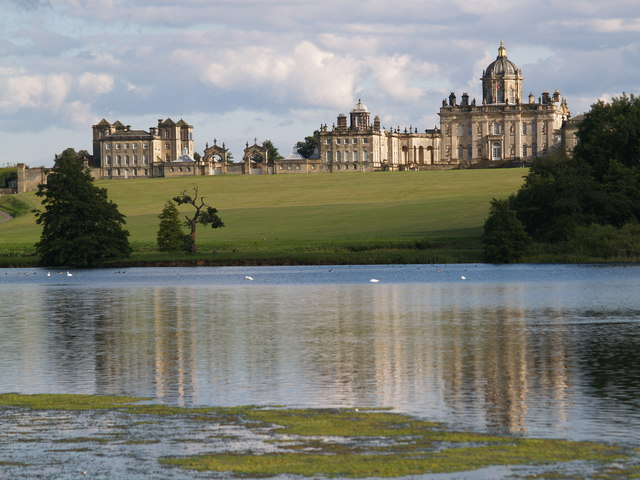
Castle Howard, north front

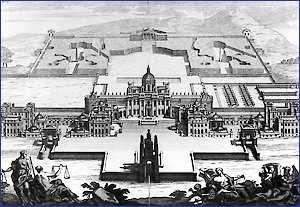
Castle Howard, north front

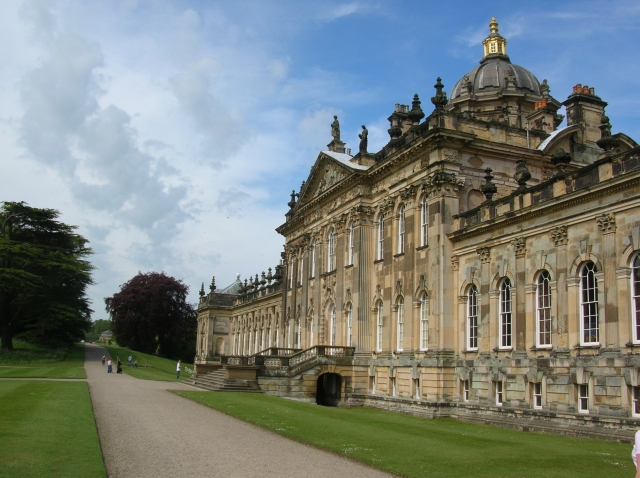
Castle Howard, south front

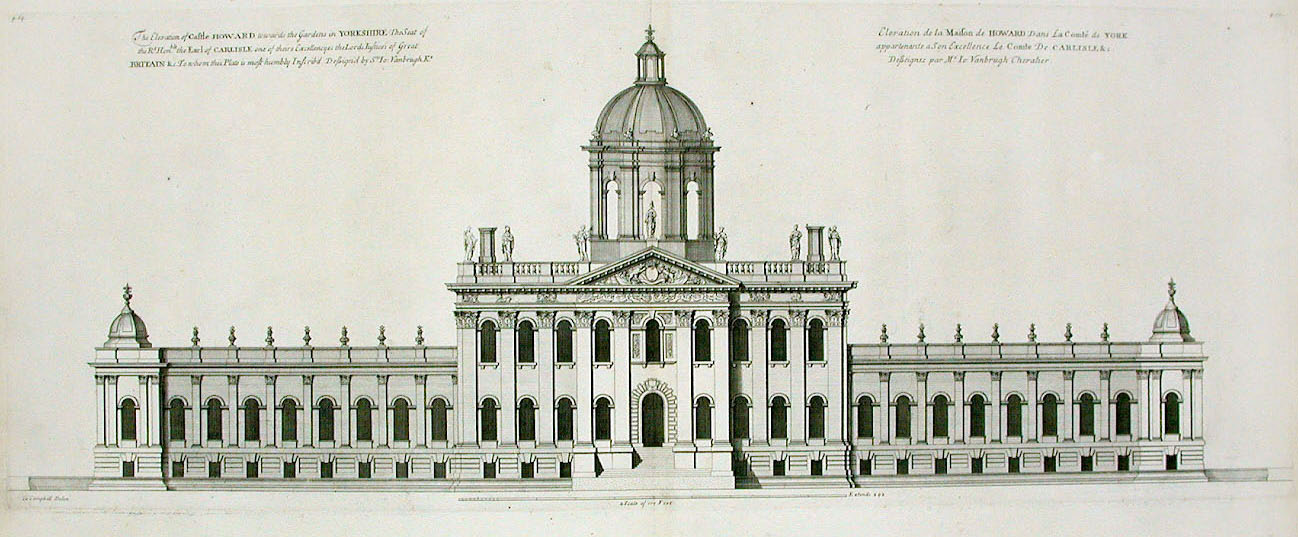
Castle Howard, south front

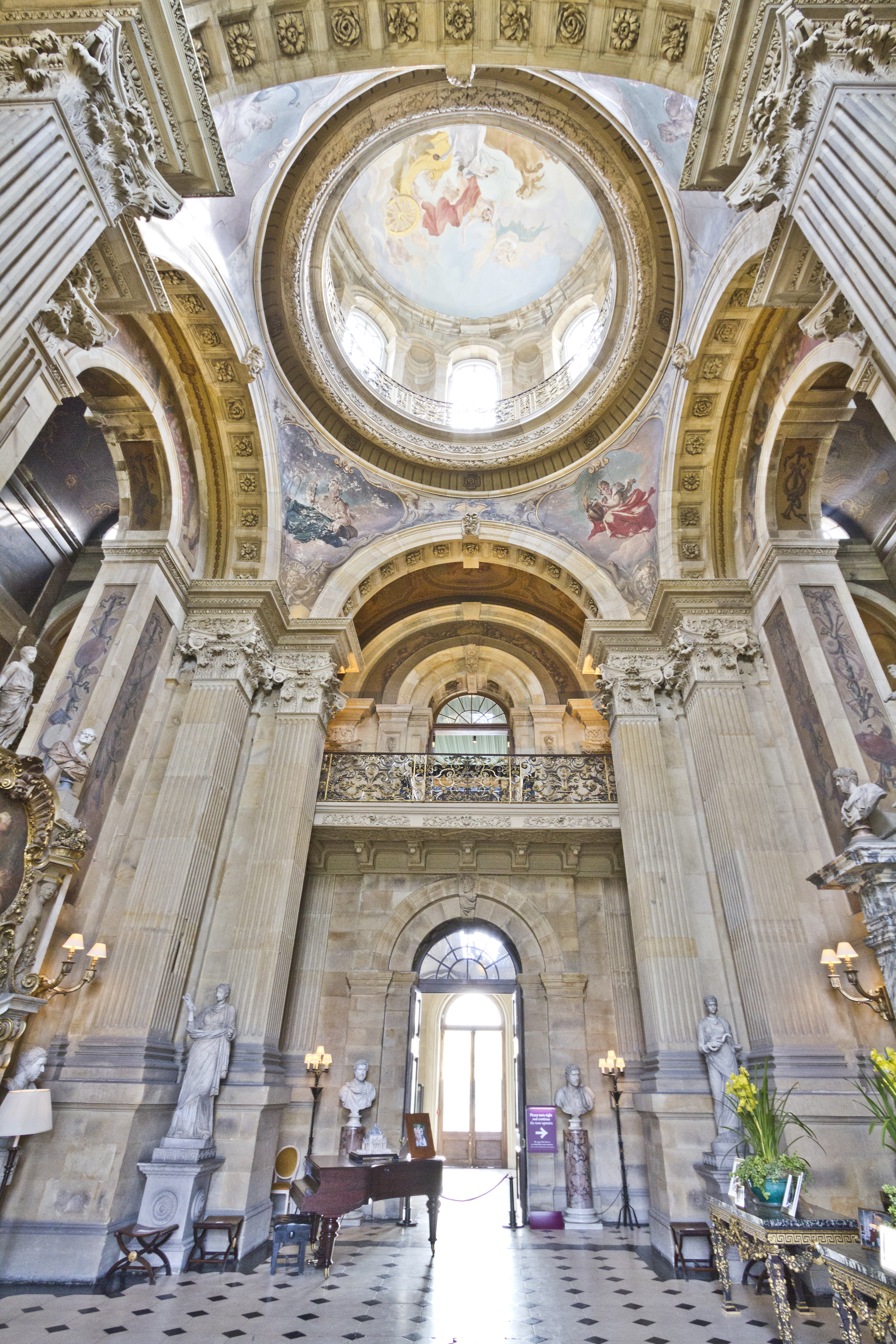
Great Hall, Castle Howard

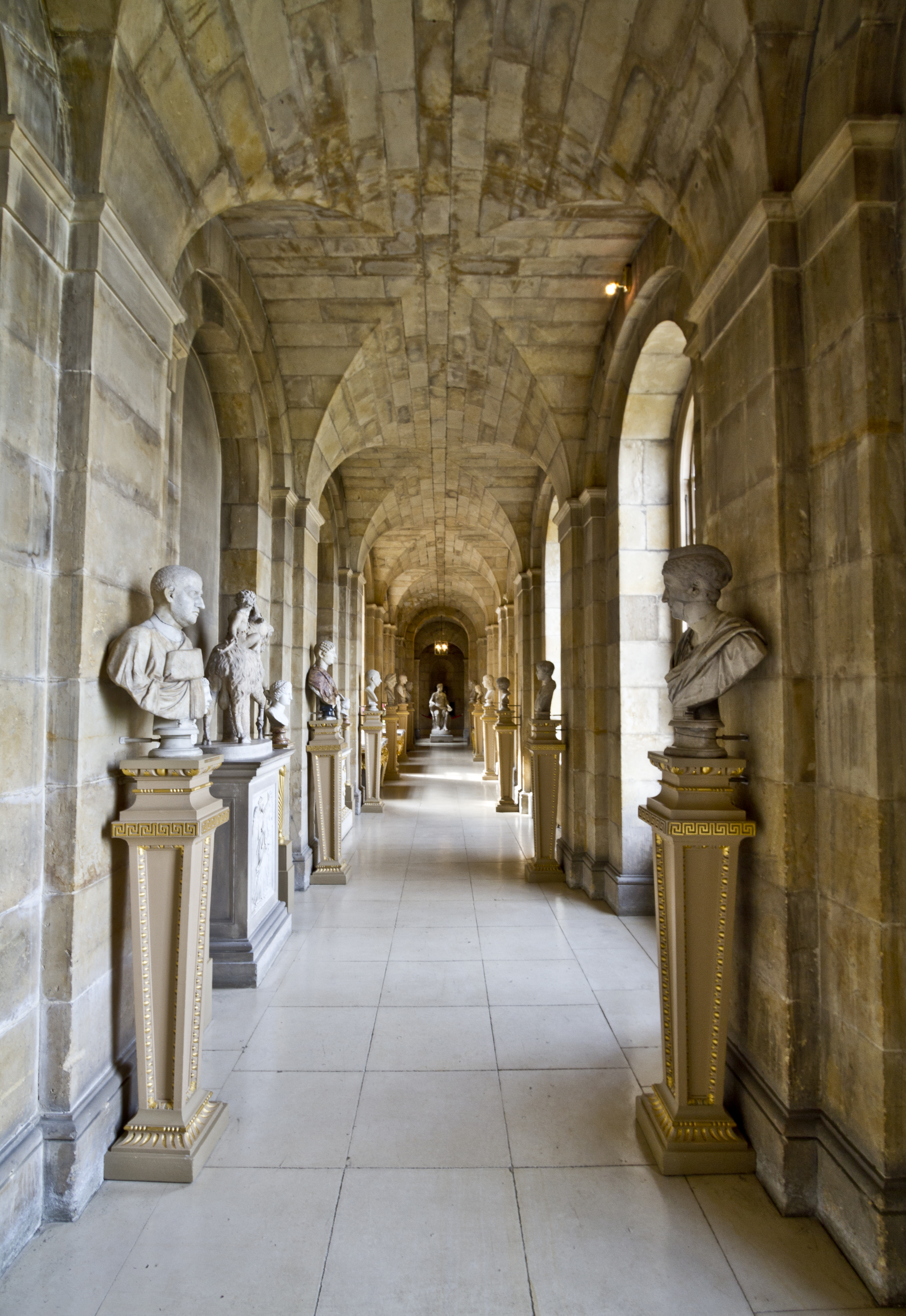
Antique Passage, Castle Howard

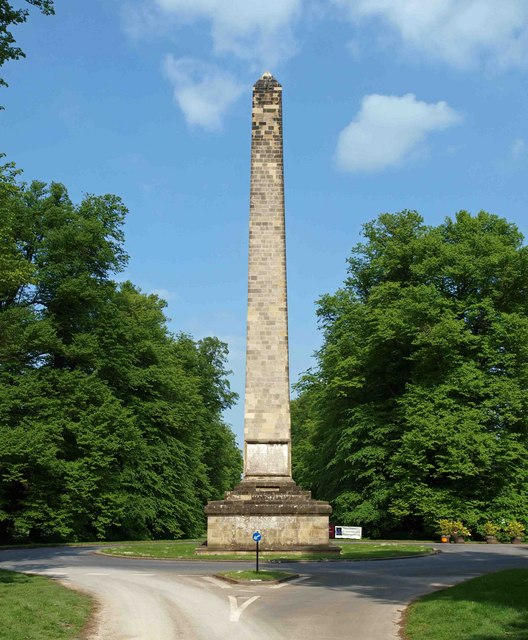
Great Obelisk, Castle Howard

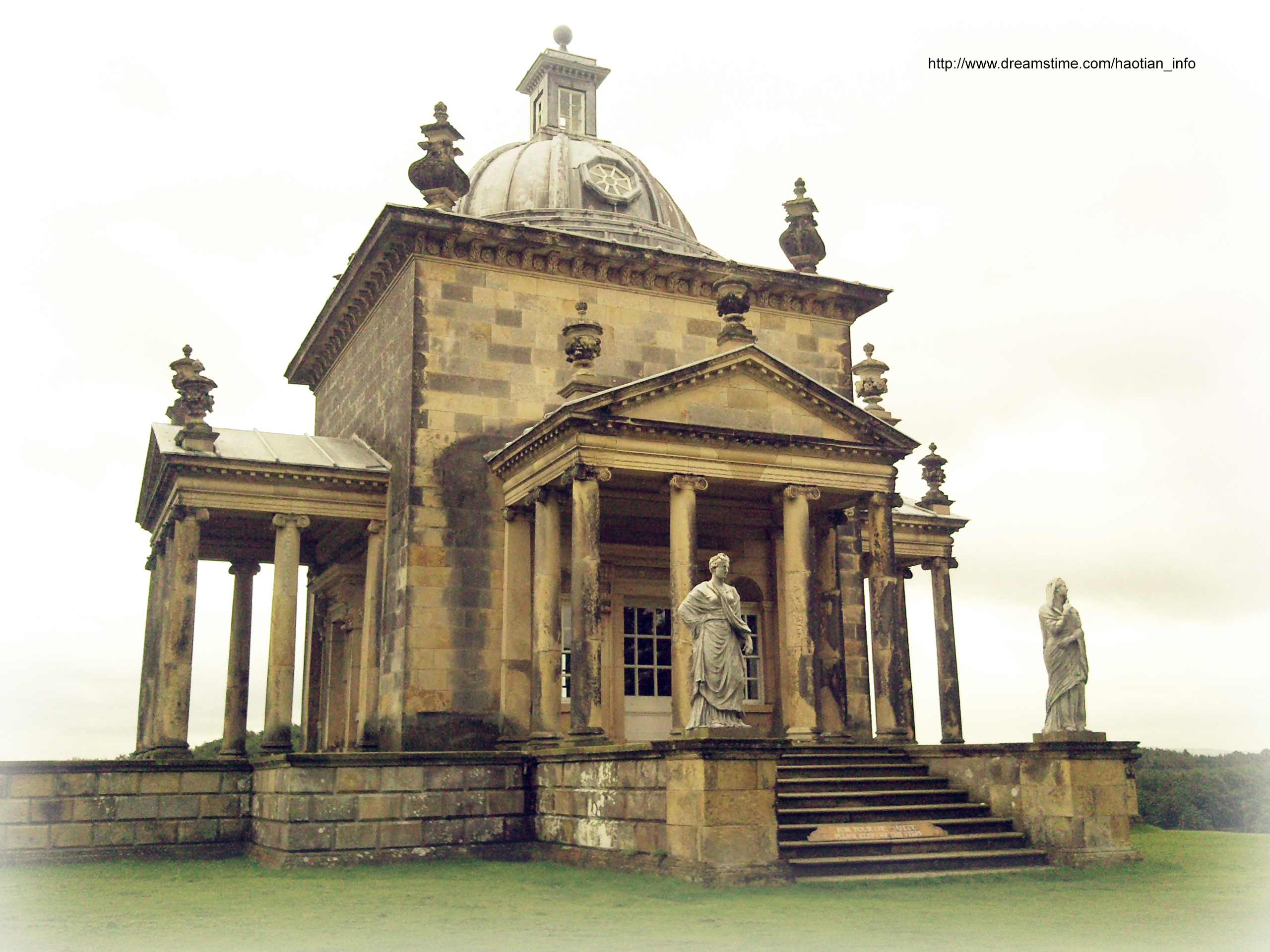
The Temple of Four Winds, Castle Howard

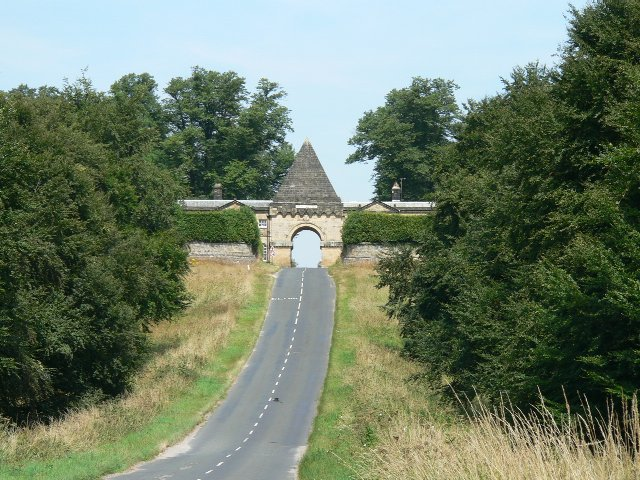
Pyramid Gate, Castle Howard

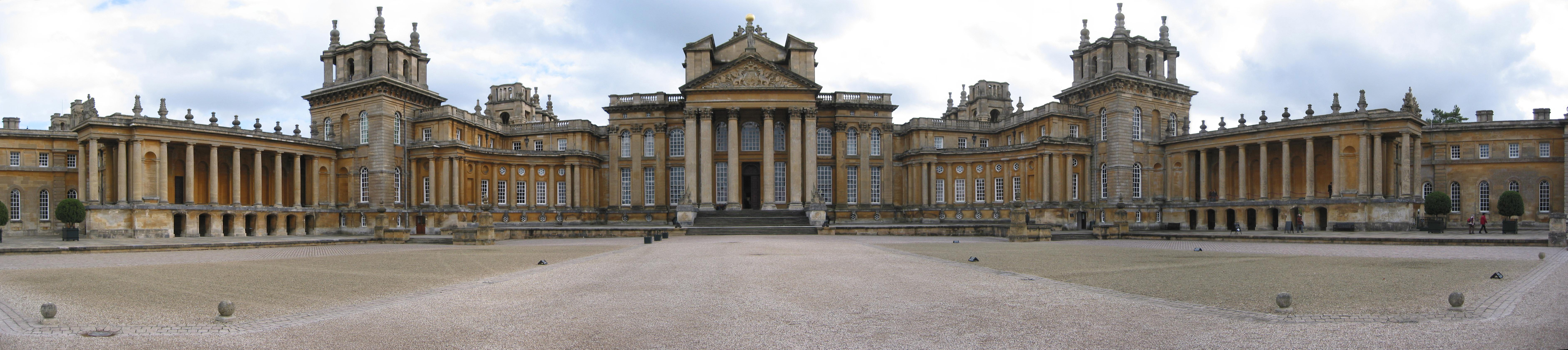
Blenheim Palace, north front

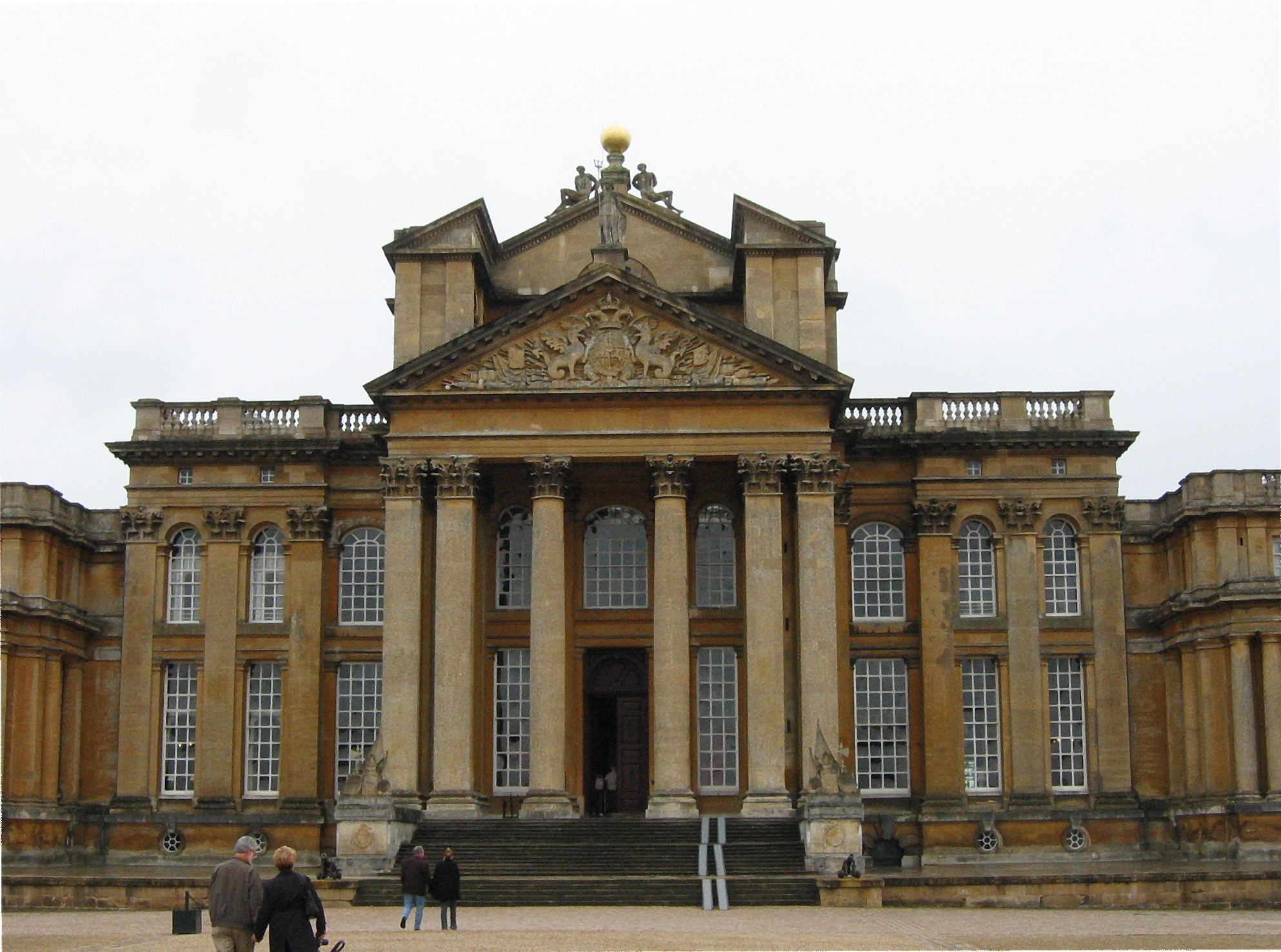
North portico, Blenheim Palace

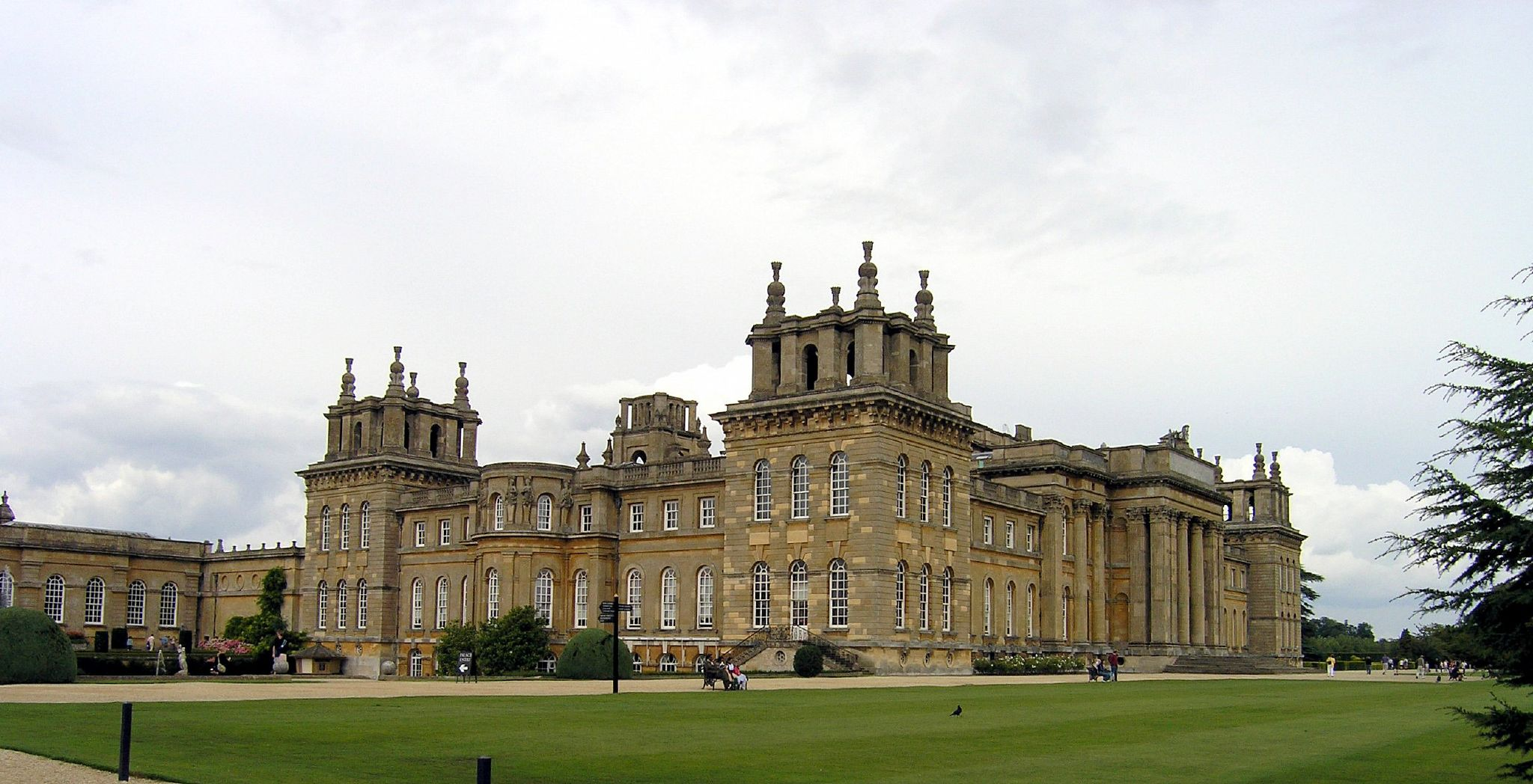
Blenheim Palace, from the south-west

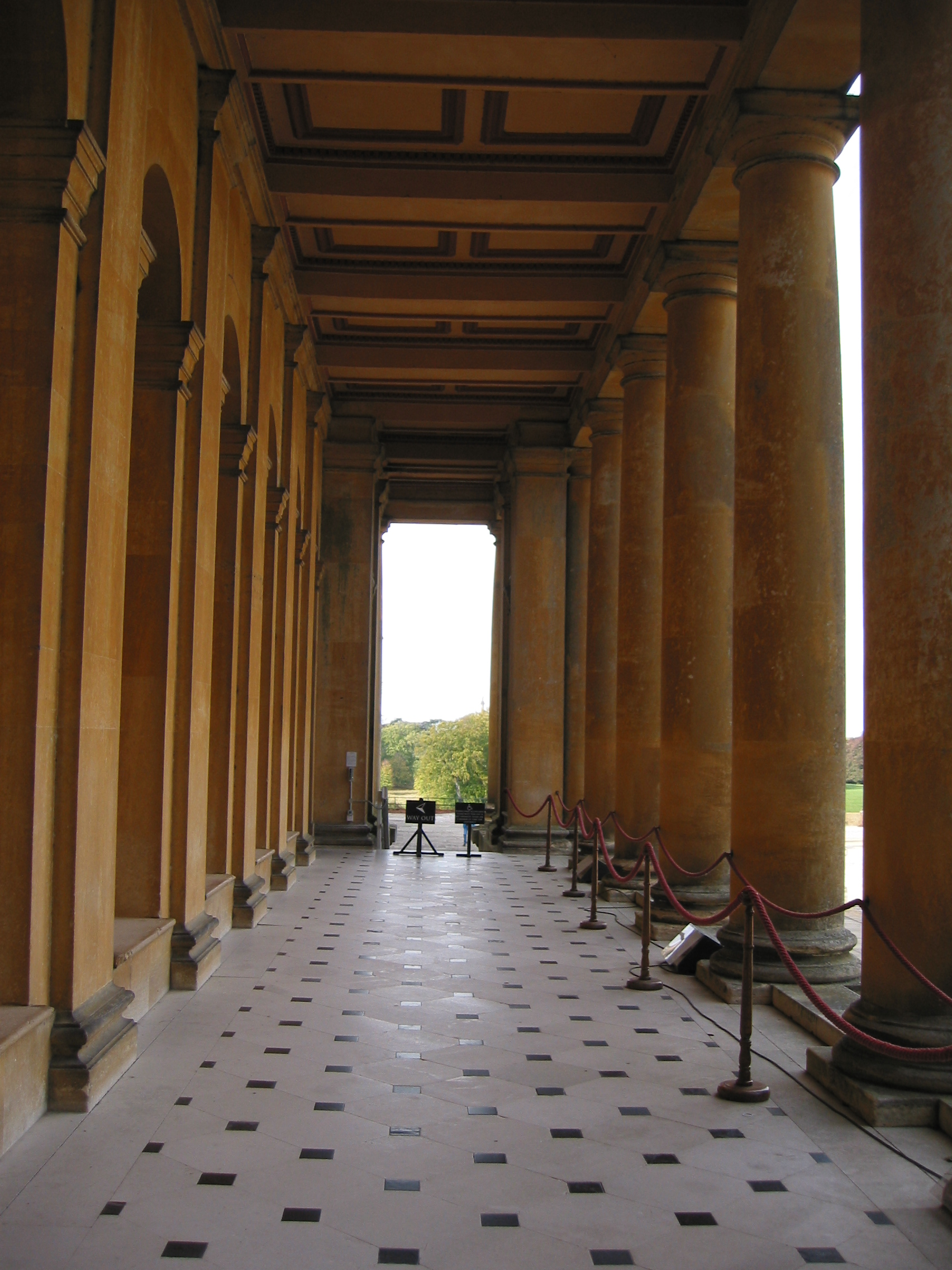
Blenheim Palace, view north along the chapel colonnade

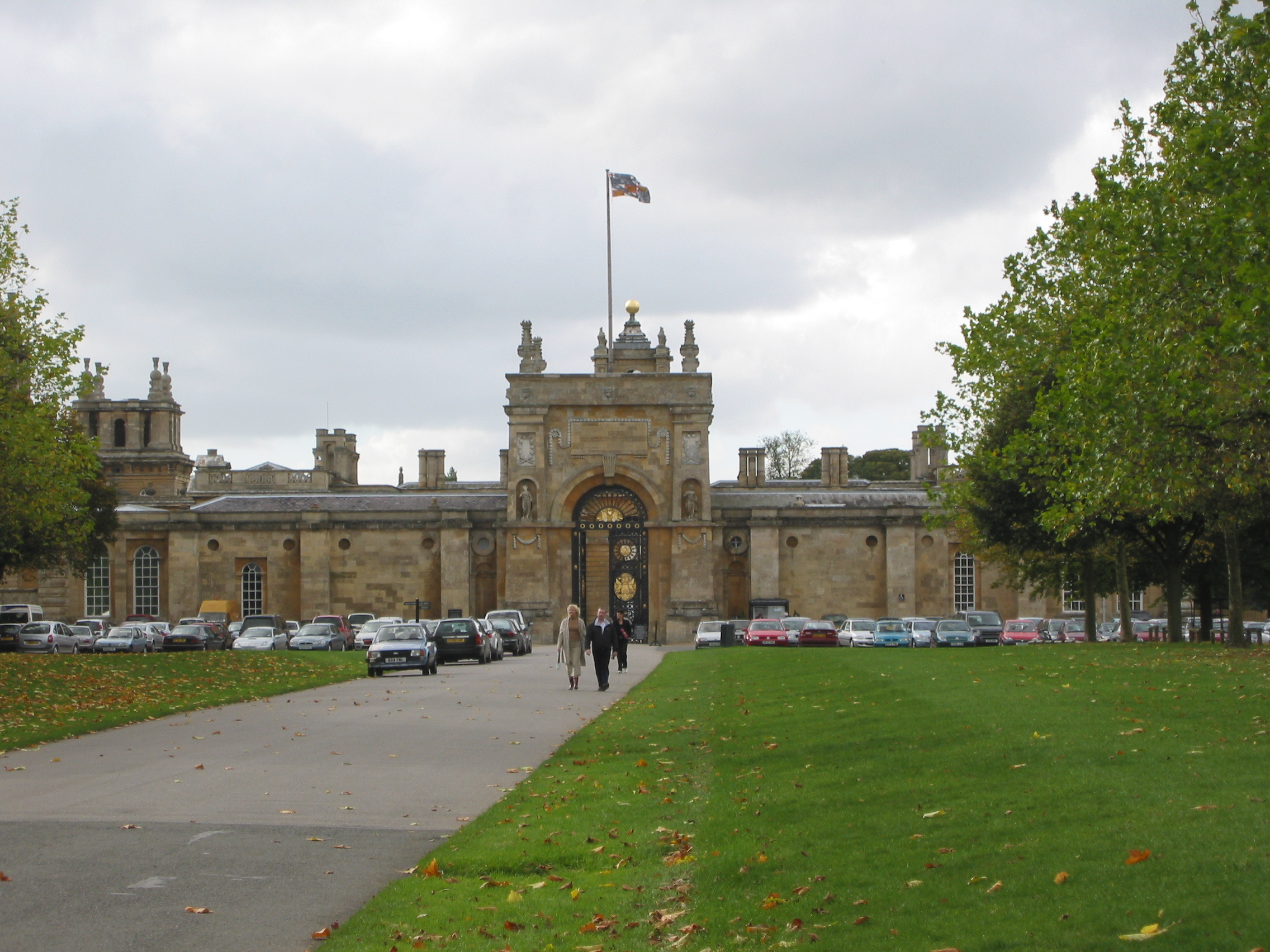
Entrance to Kitchen court, Blenheim Palace

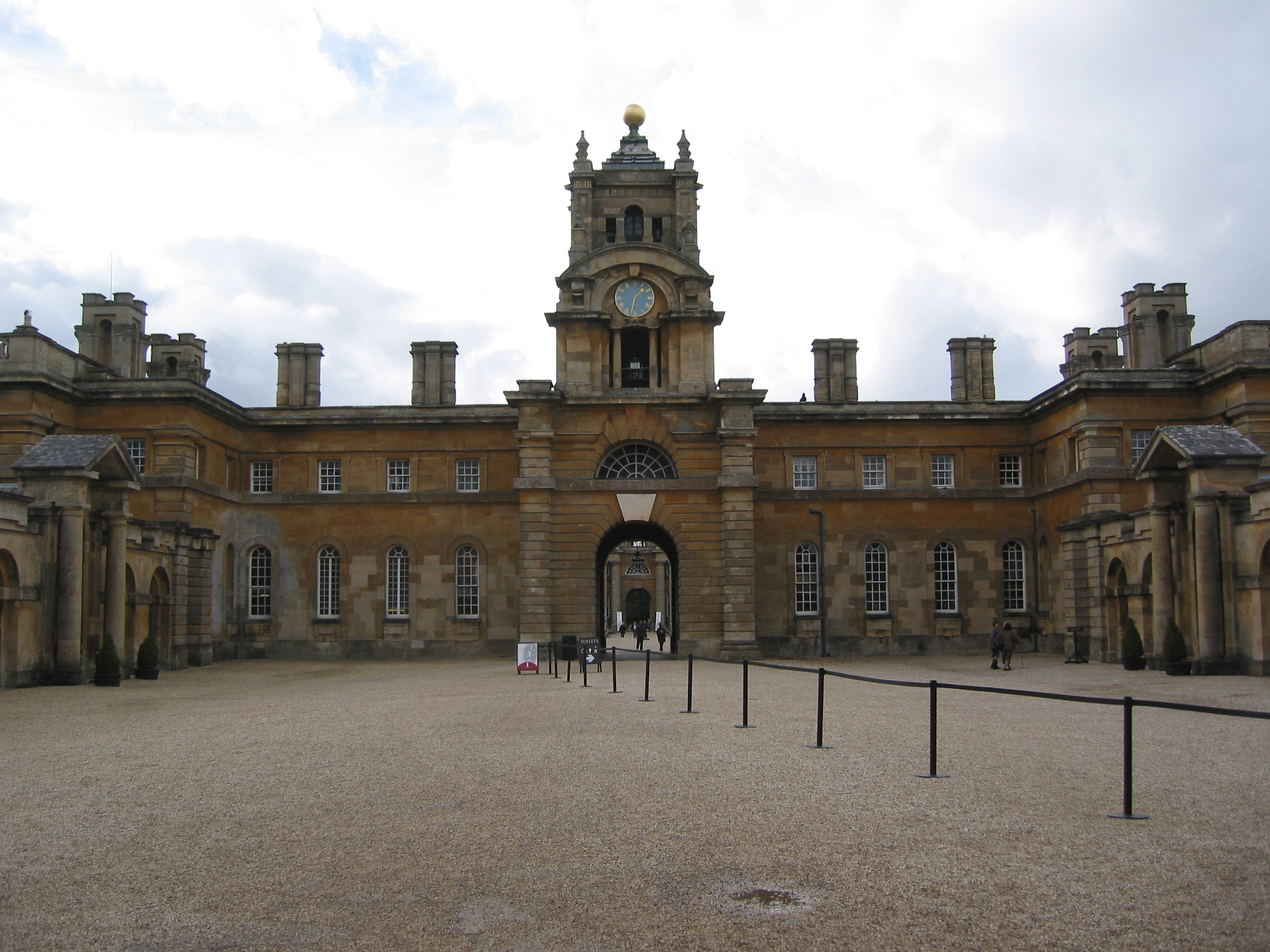
Kitchen court, Blenheim Palace

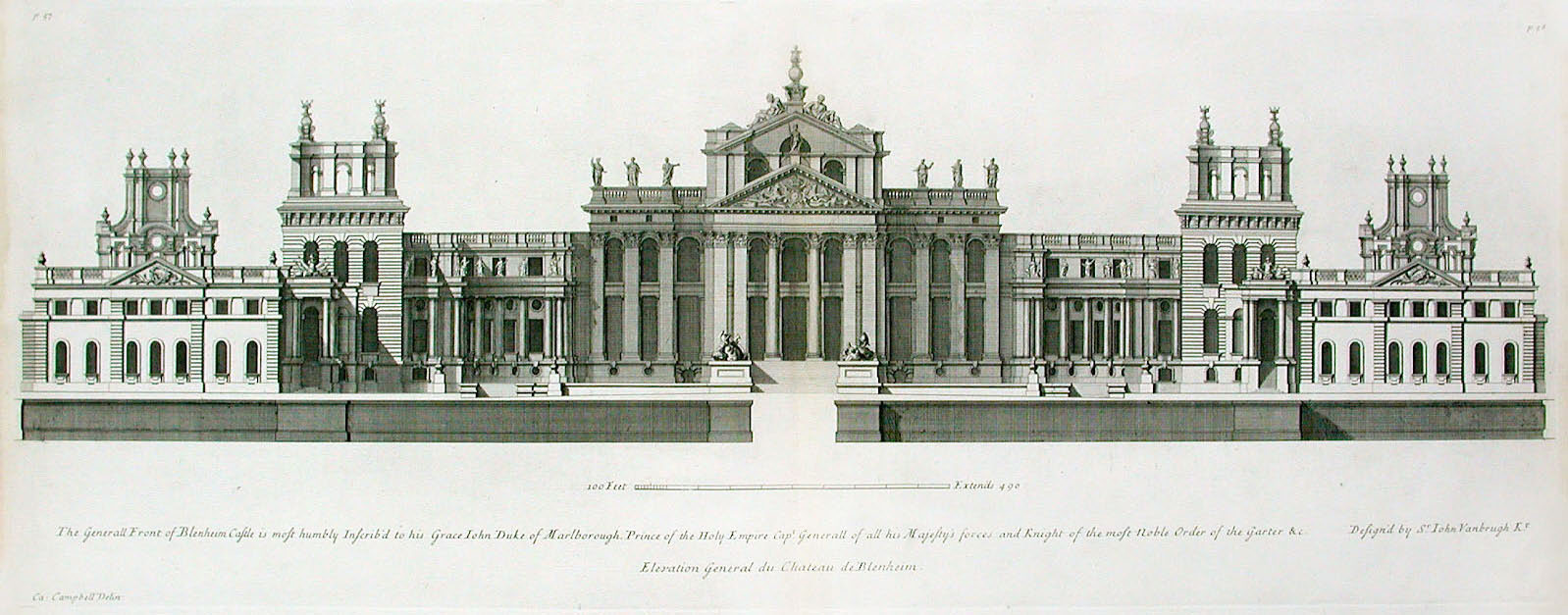
South front, Blenheim Palace

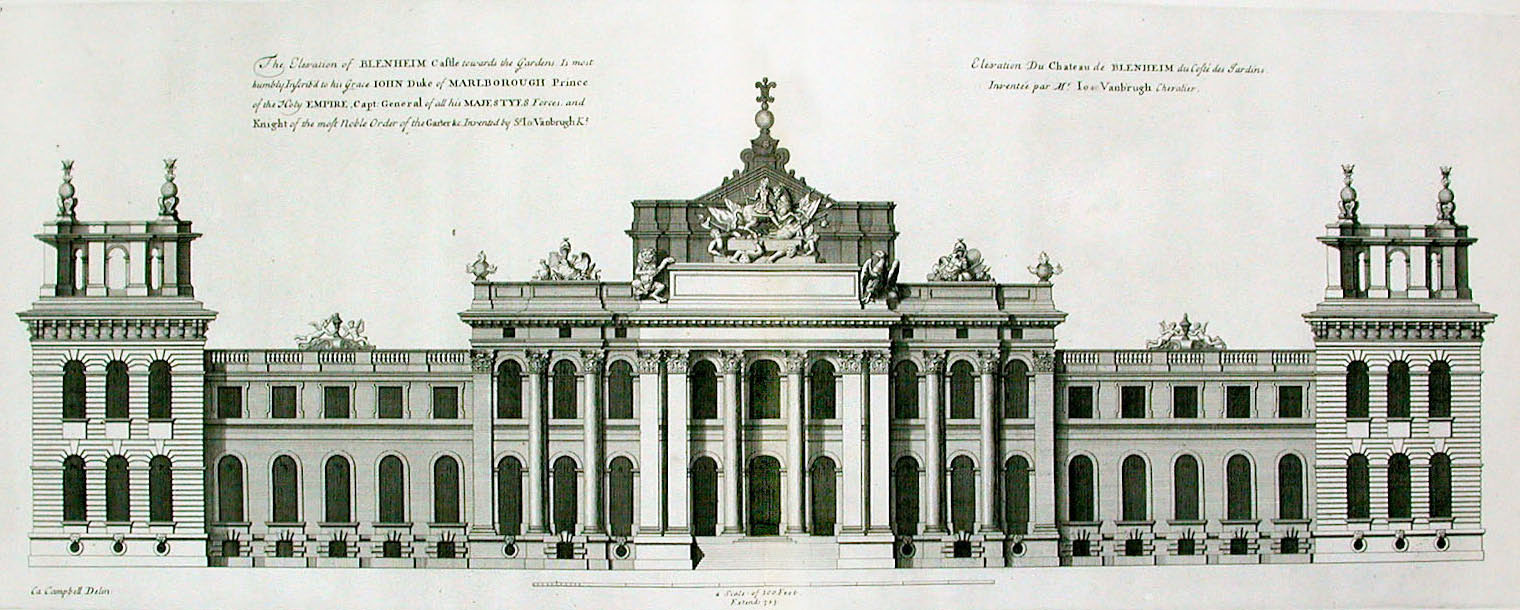
North front, Blenheim Palace

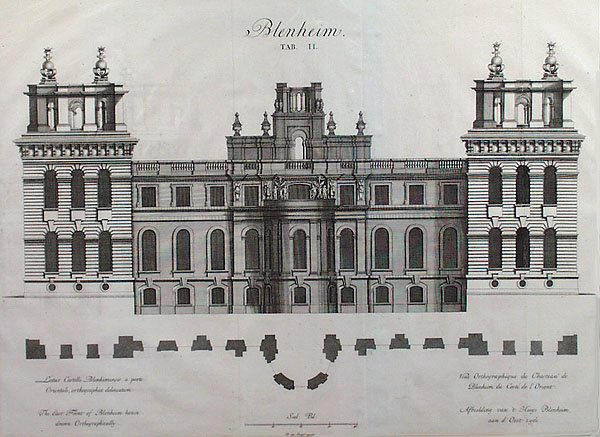
East front, Blenheim Palace

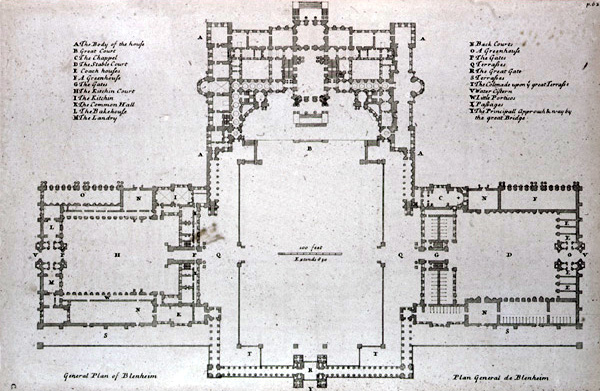
Plan of Blenheim Palace, the colonnade enclosing the courtyard was never built

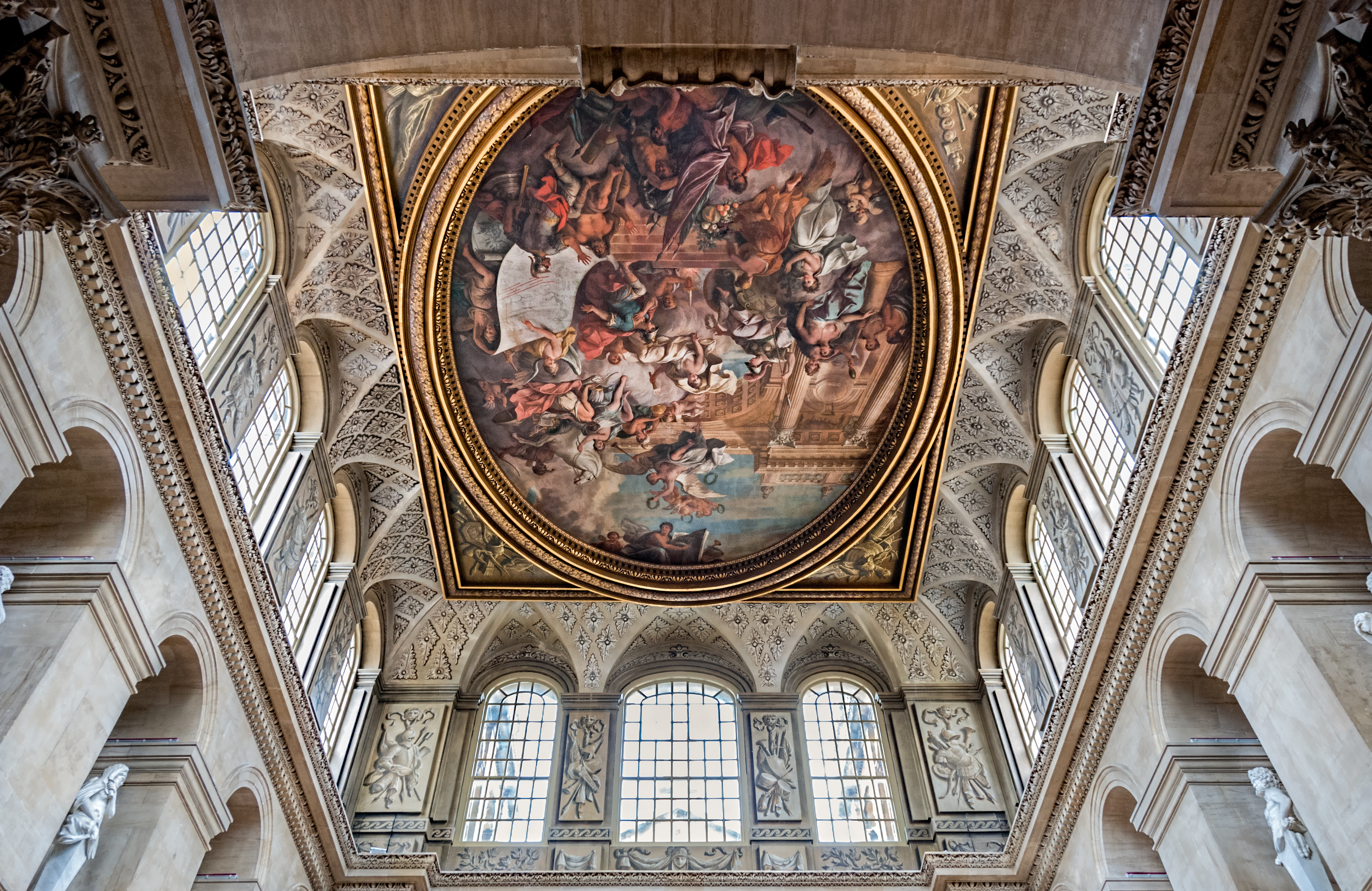
Great Hall, Blenheim Palace

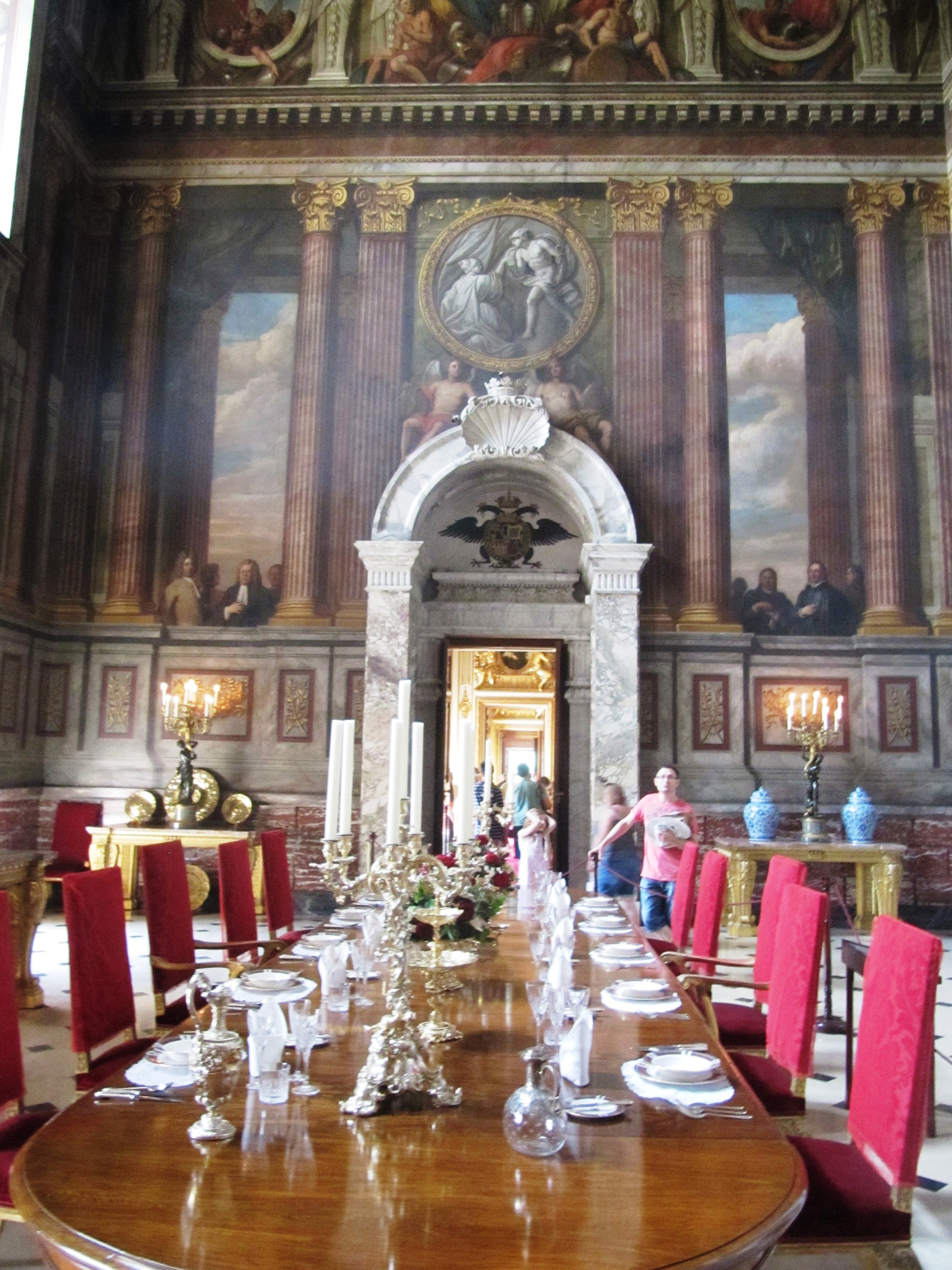
Saloon, Blenheim Palace

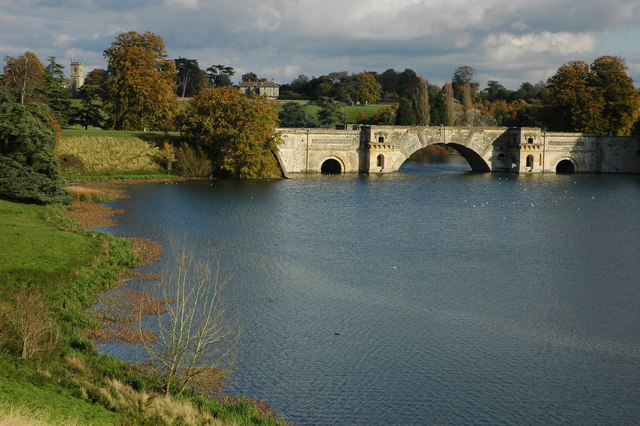
Grand Bridge, Blenheim Palace

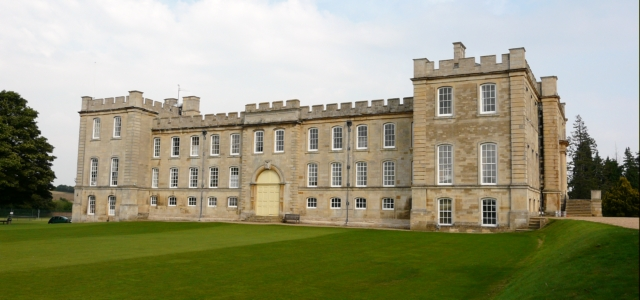
Kimbolton Castle

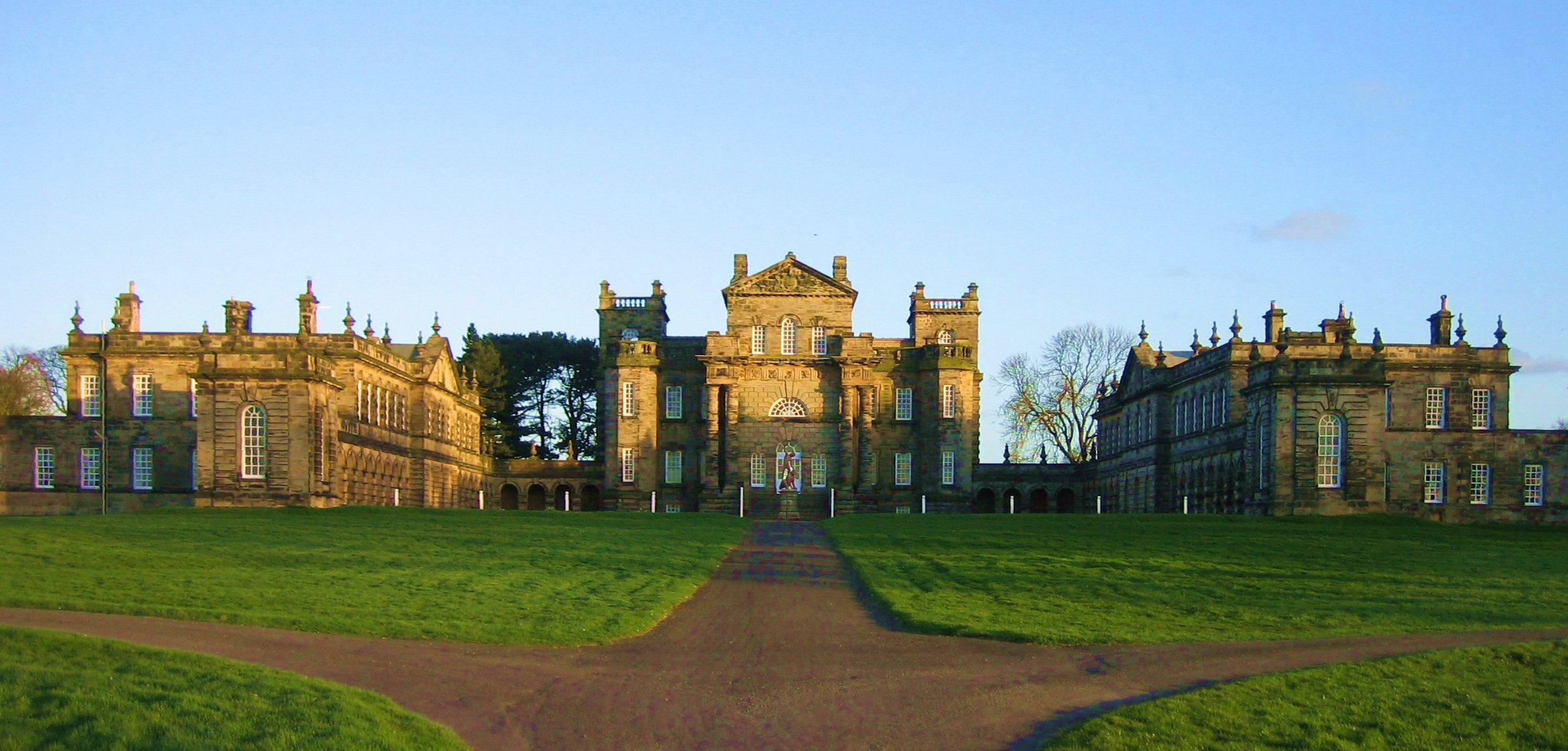
Seaton Delaval Hall, north front

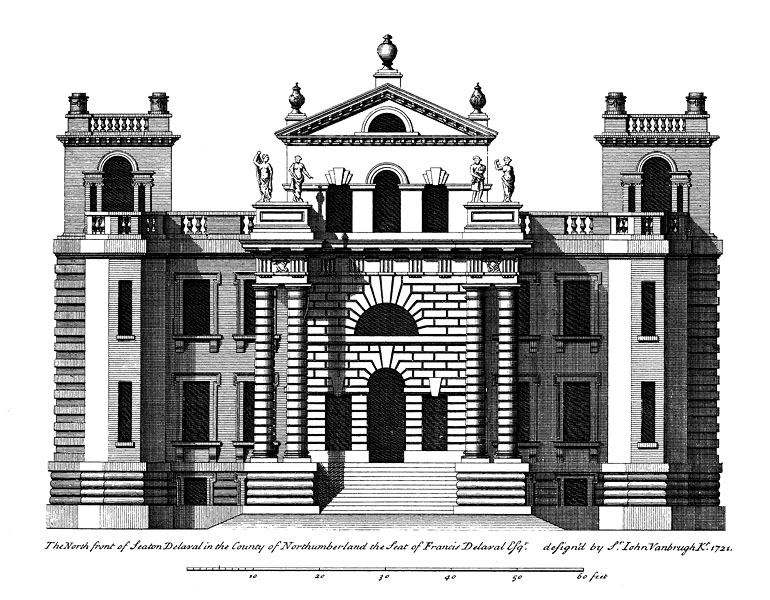
Seaton Delaval Hall, north front

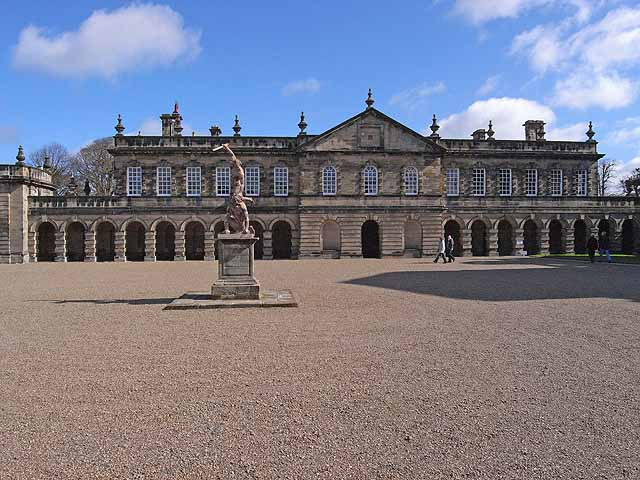
East wing, Seaton Delaval Hall

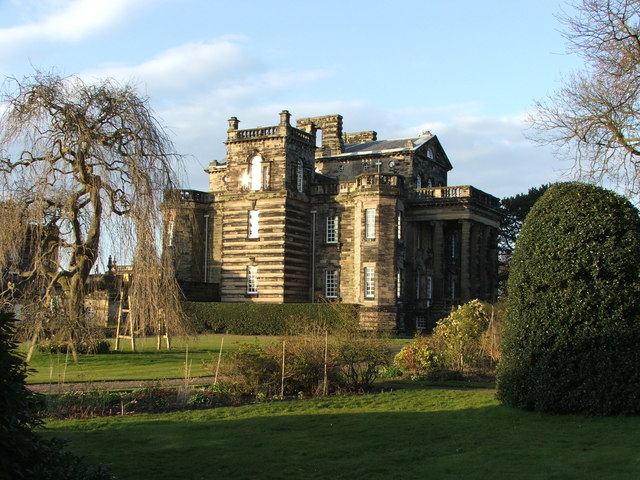
Seaton Delaval Hall, from the south-west

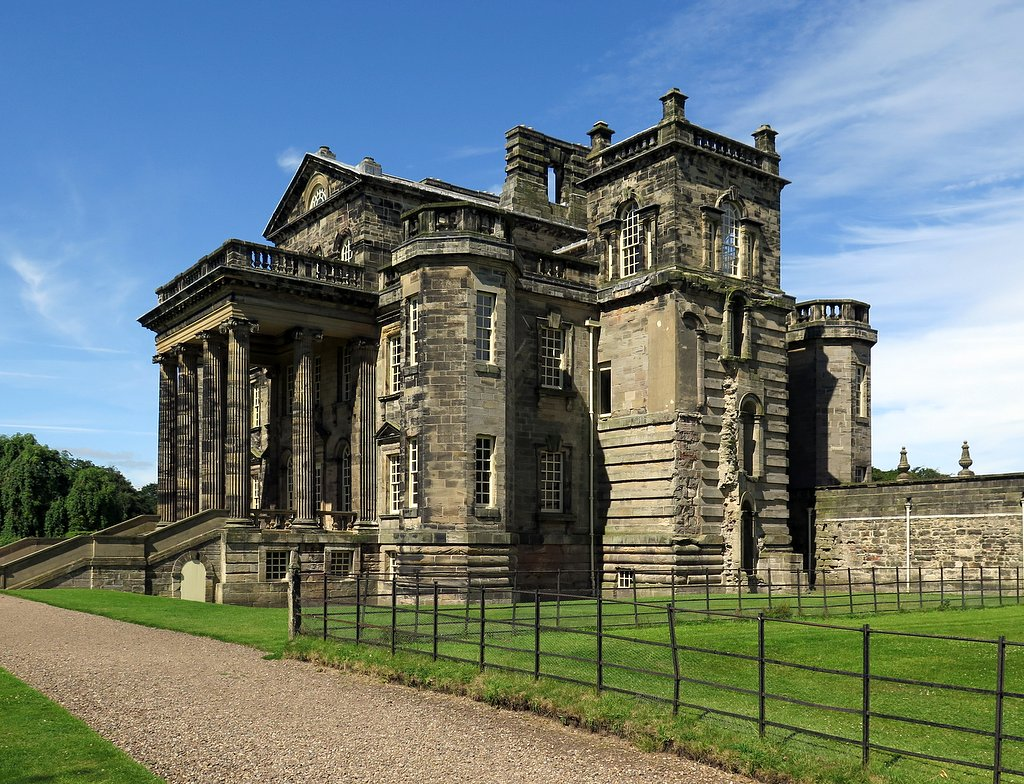
Seaton Delaval Hall, from the south-east

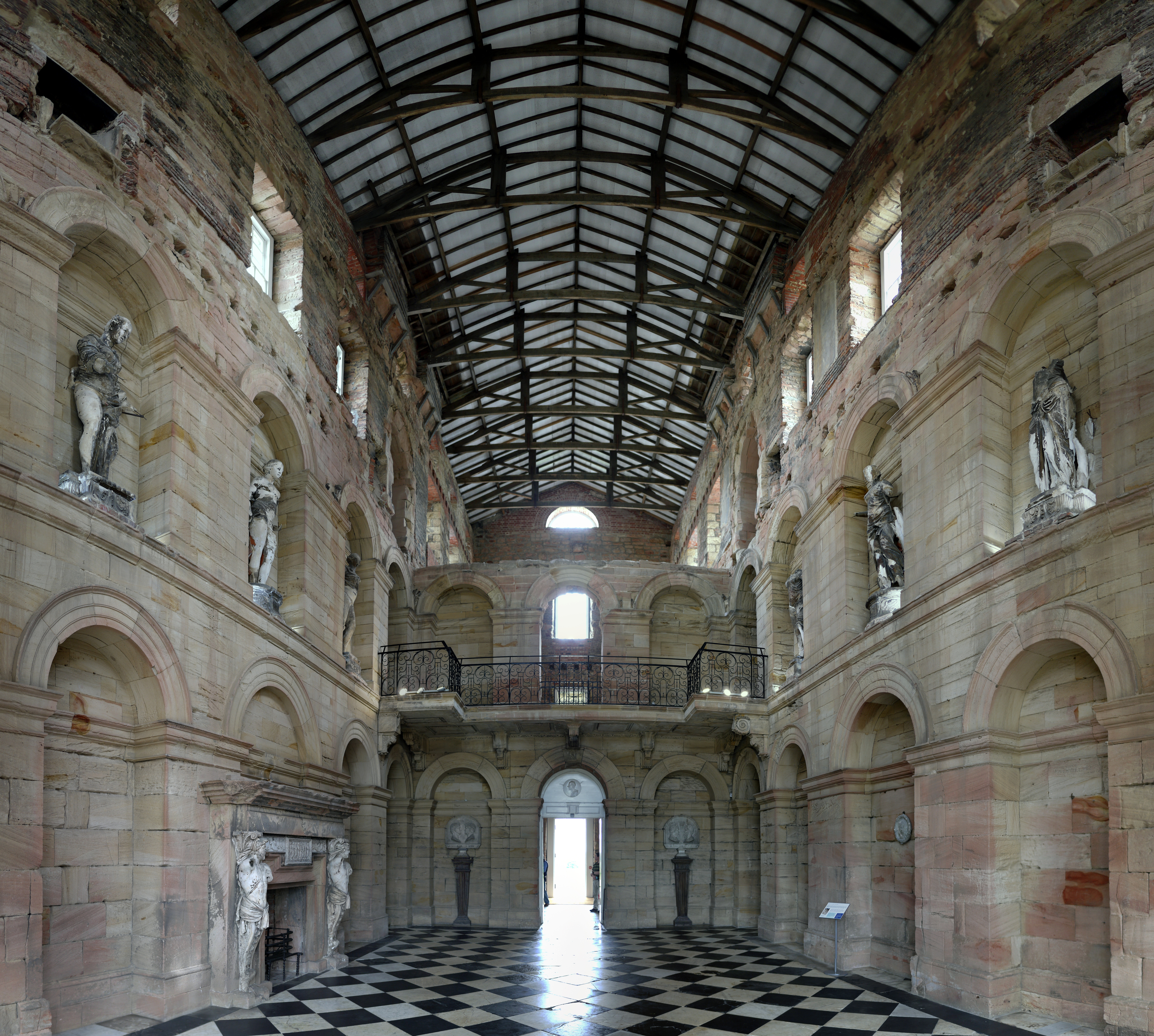
Great Hall, Seaton Delaval Hall

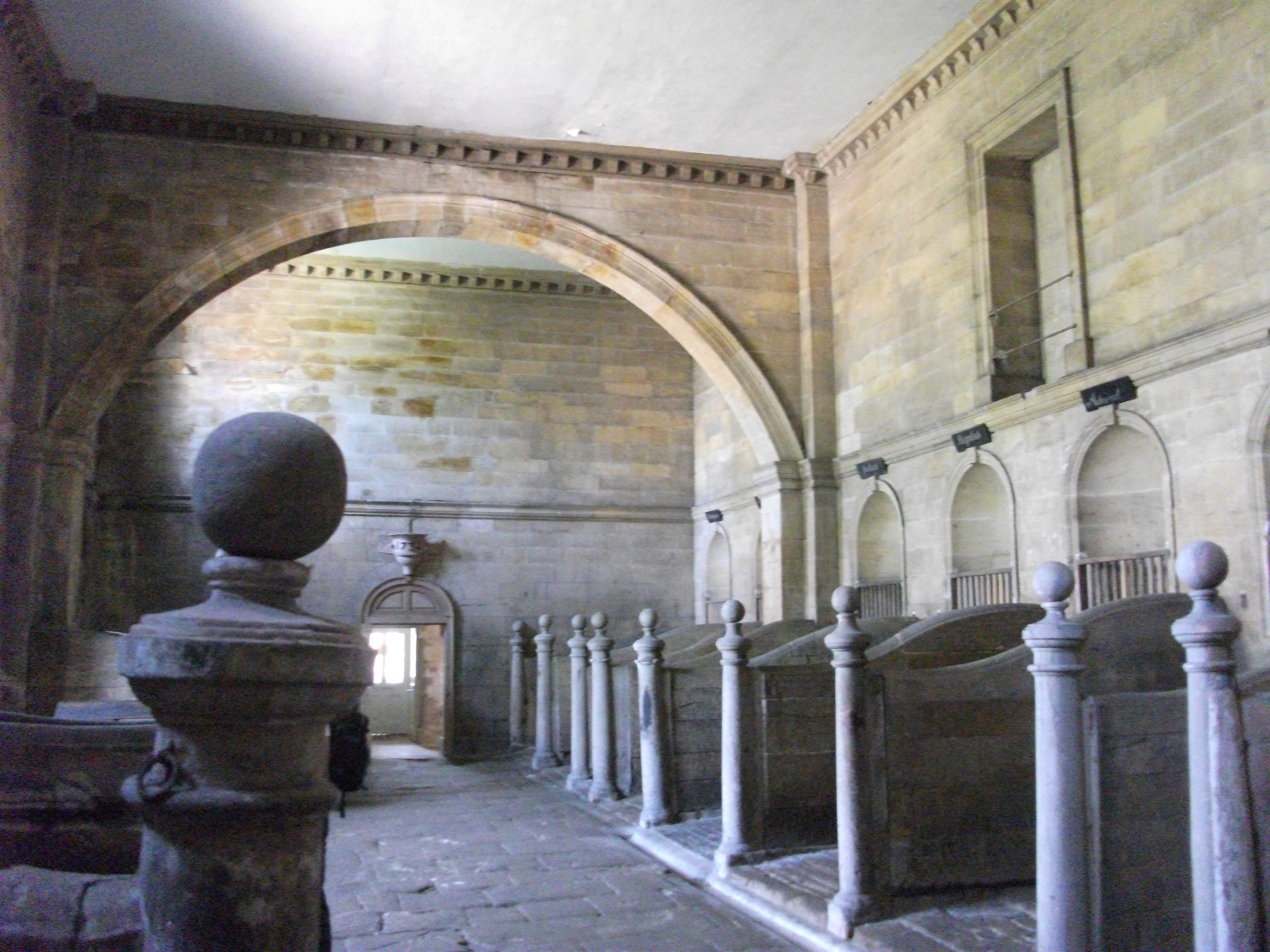
Stables, Seaton Delaval Hall

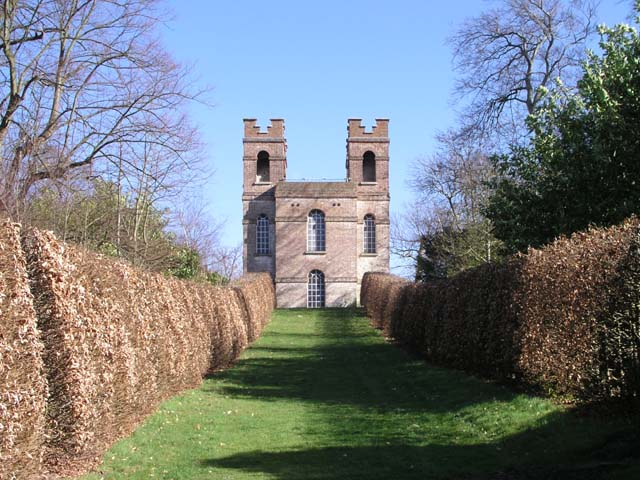
Belvedere, Claremont

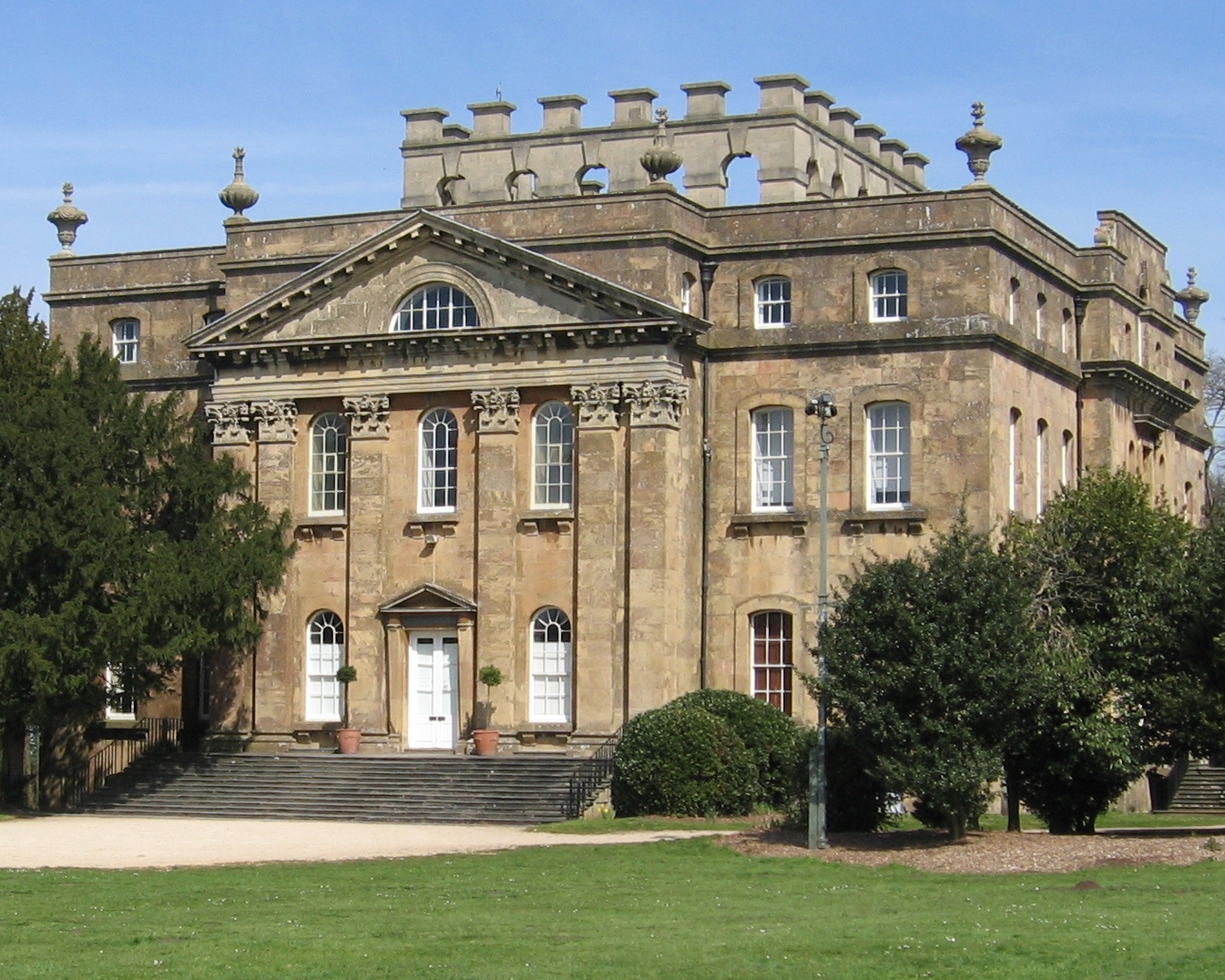
South front, Kings Weston House

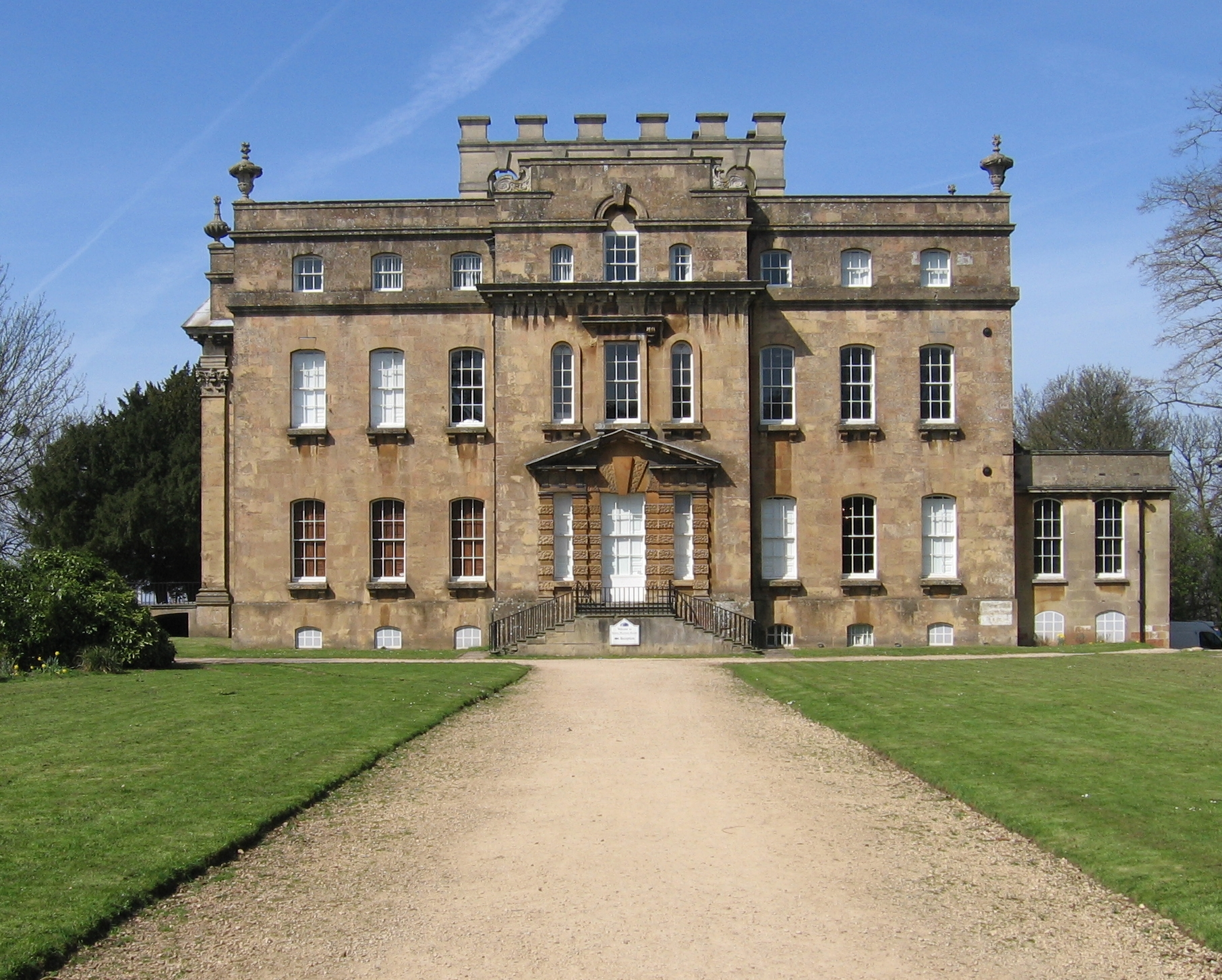
East front, Kings Weston House

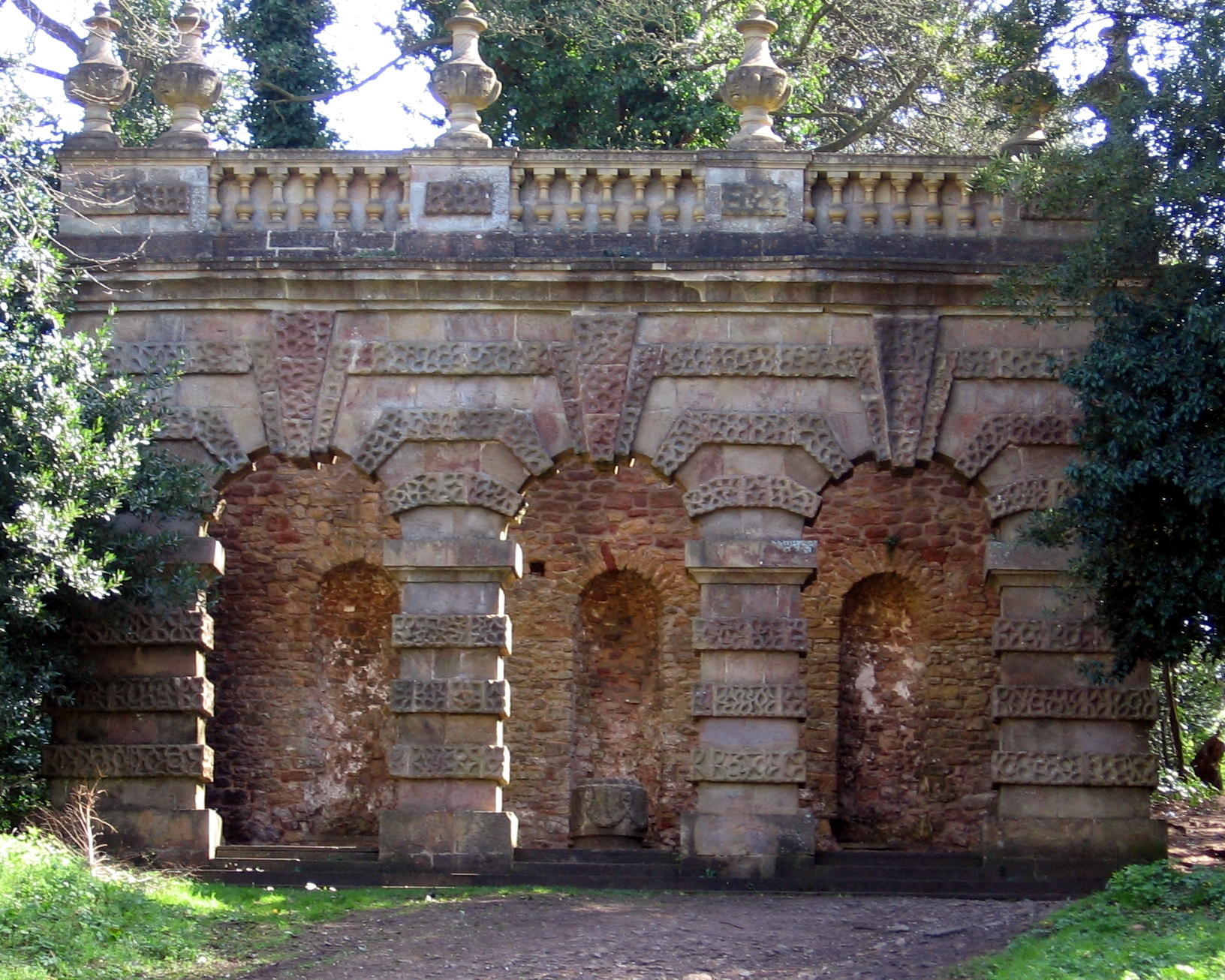
Loggia, Kings Weston House (attributed to Vanbrugh)

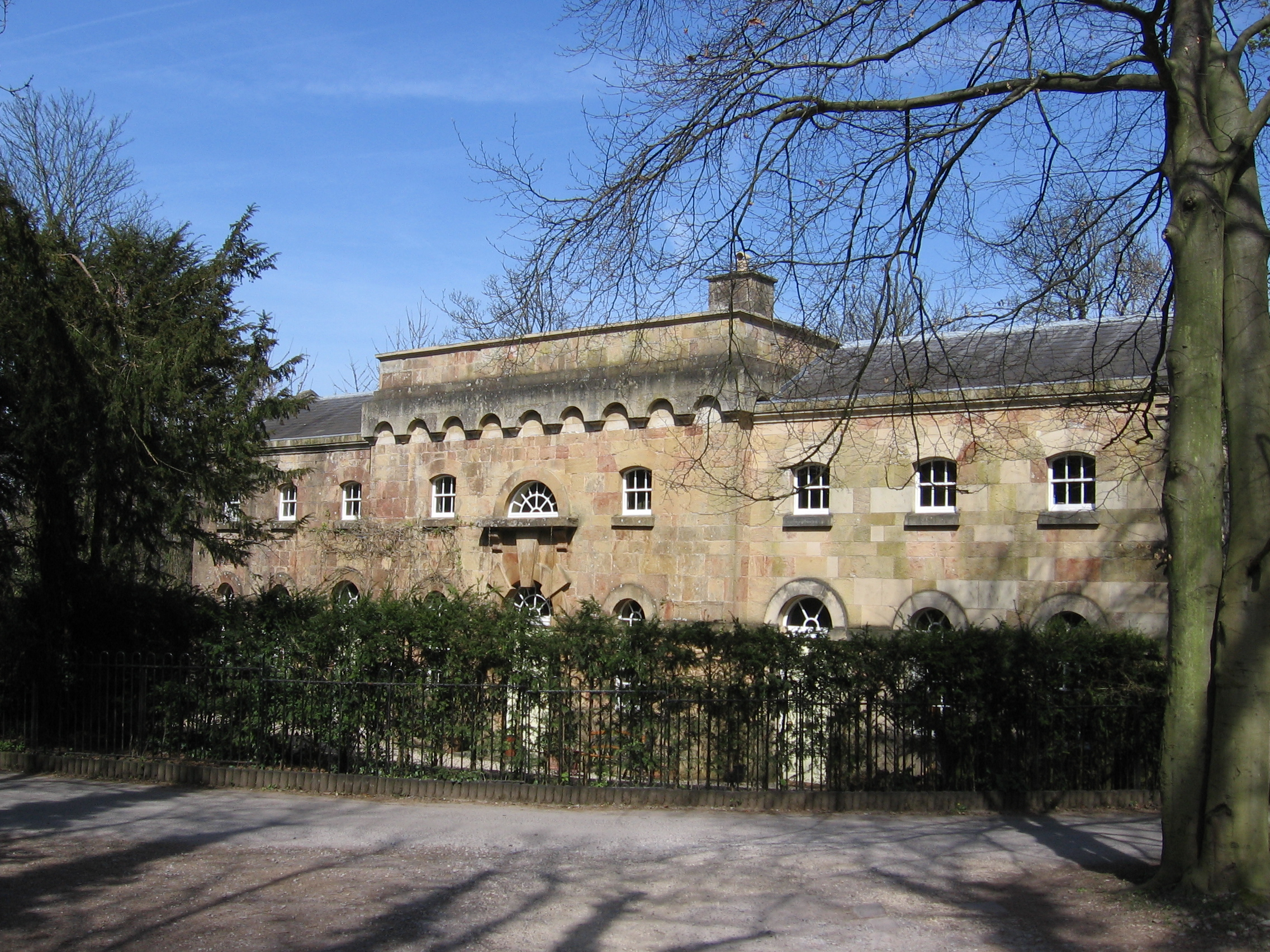
The Brewhouse, Kings Weston House (attributed to Vanbrugh)

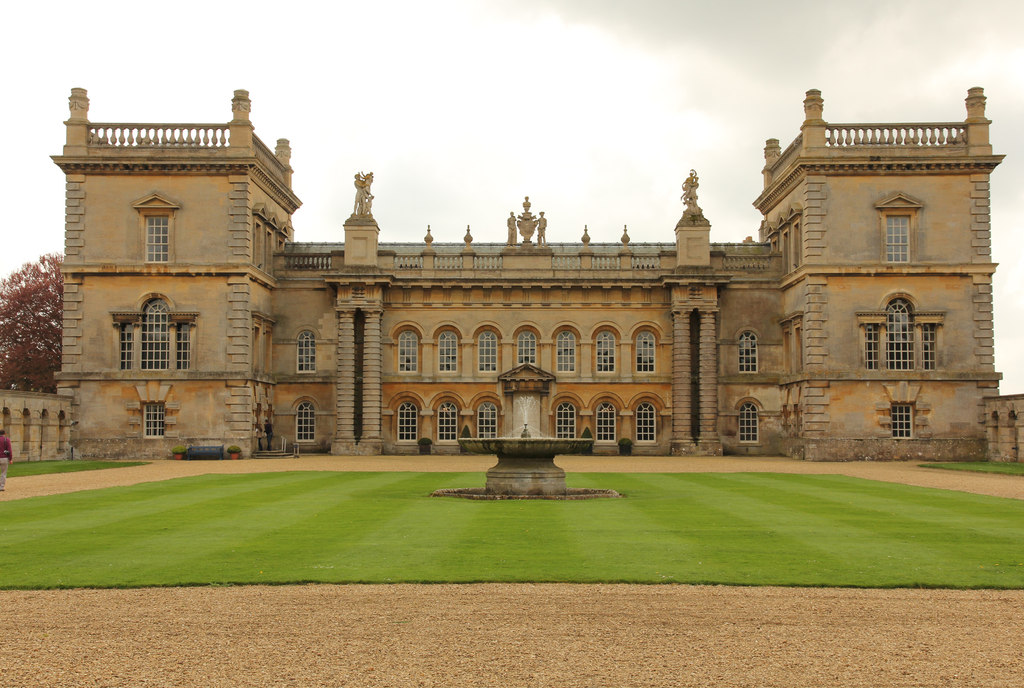
Grimsthorpe Castle, from the north

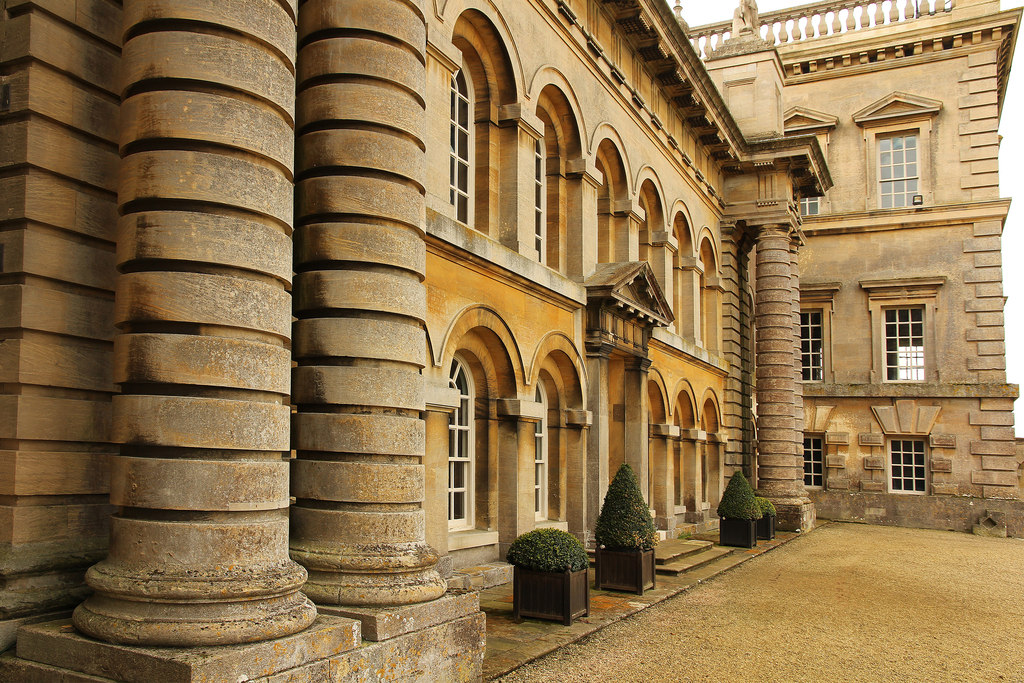
Grimsthorpe Castle, detail of the north front

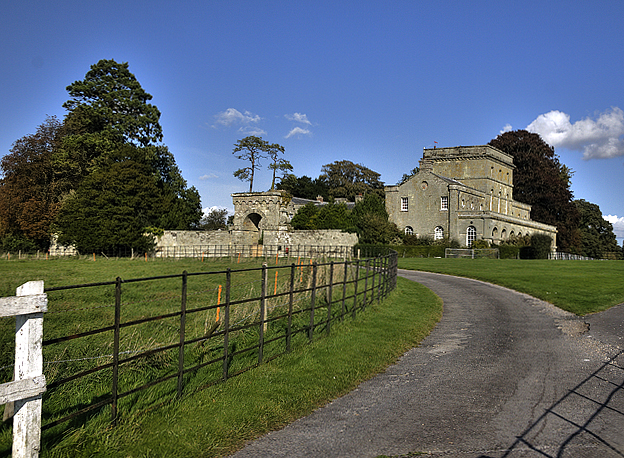
Eastbury House, Doset, the surviving kitchen wing

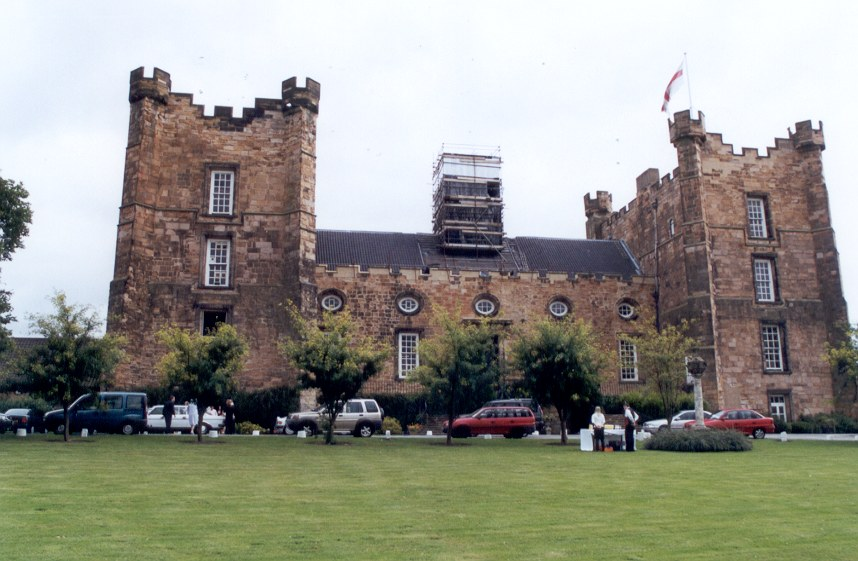
Lumley Castle

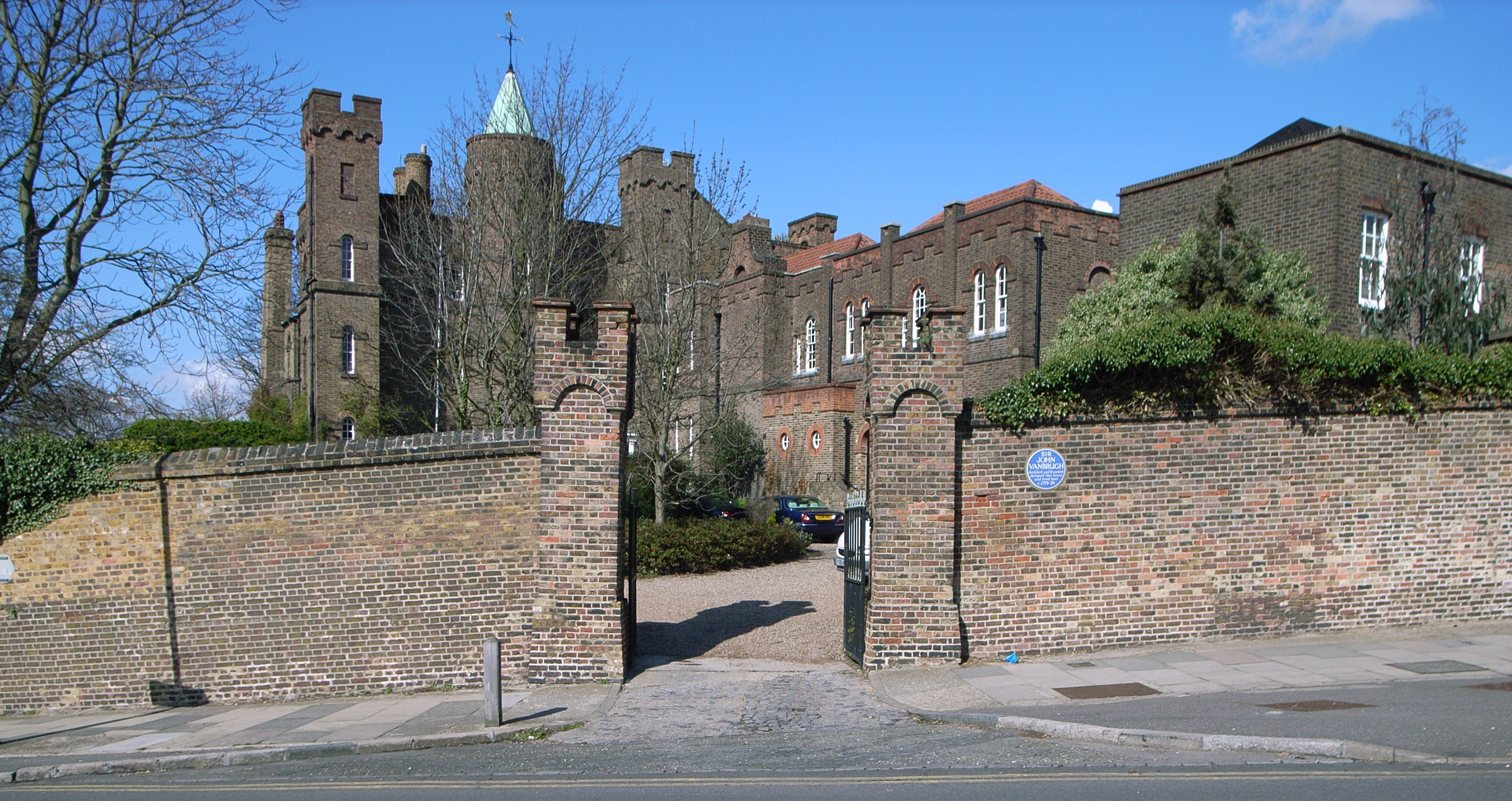
Vanburgh Castle, Greenwich

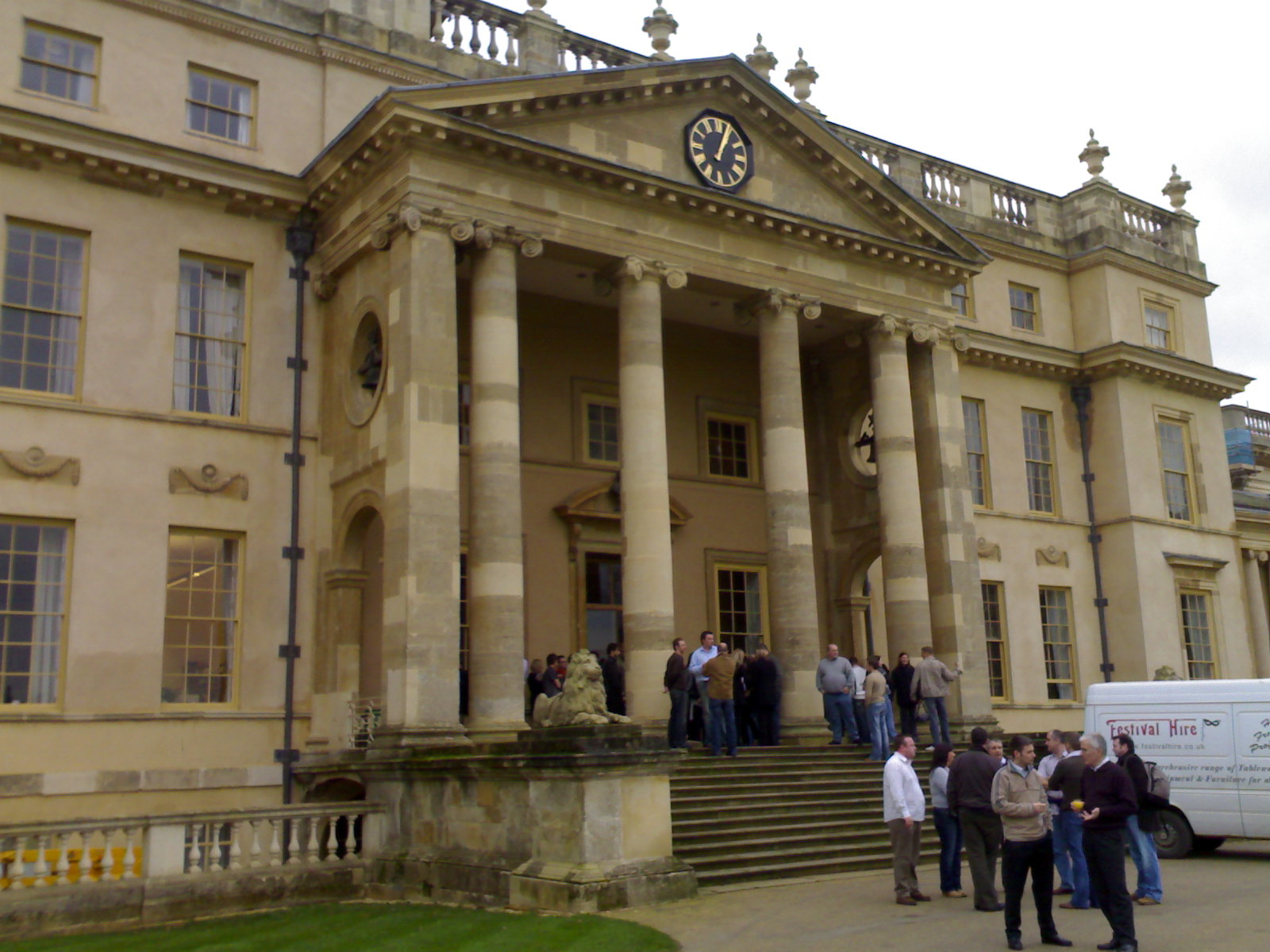
North portico, Stowe House

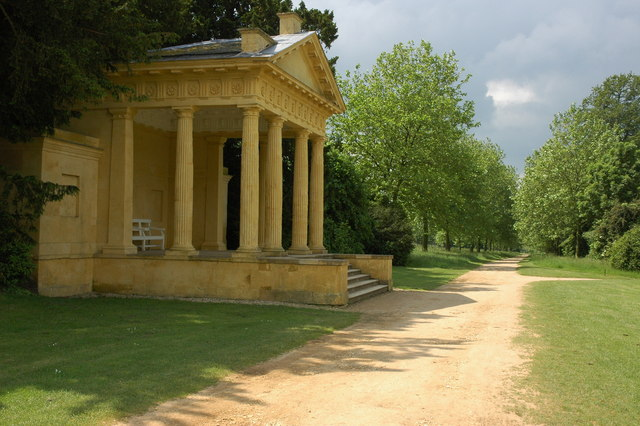
Western Lake Pavilion, Stowe

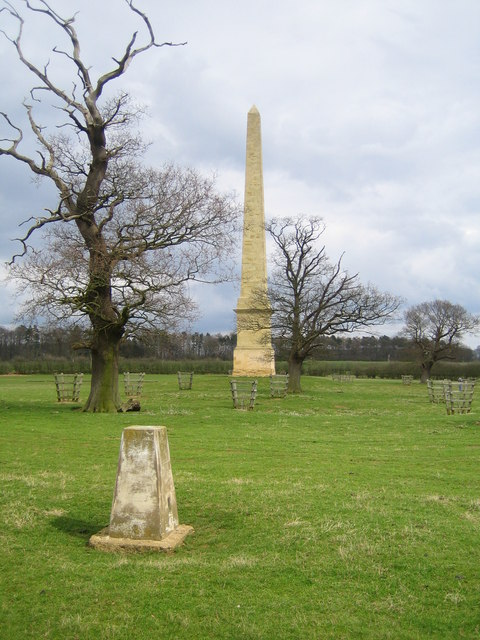
Wolfe Obelisk, Stowe

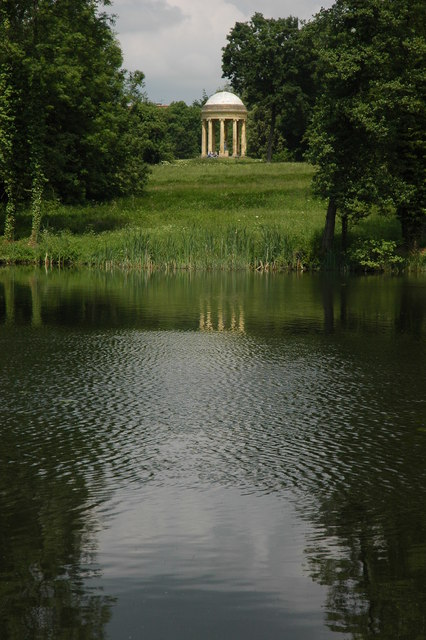
Rotunda, Stowe

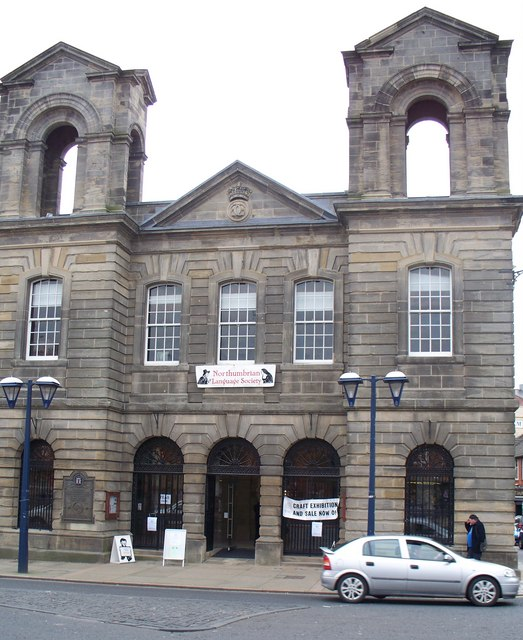
Morpeth Town Hall, Northumberland

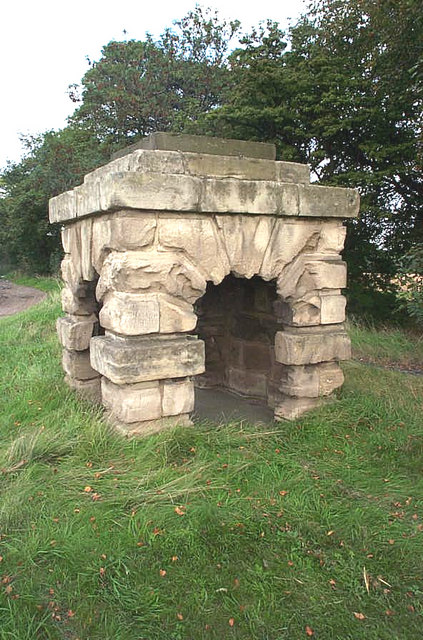
Robin Hood's Well, Yorkshire

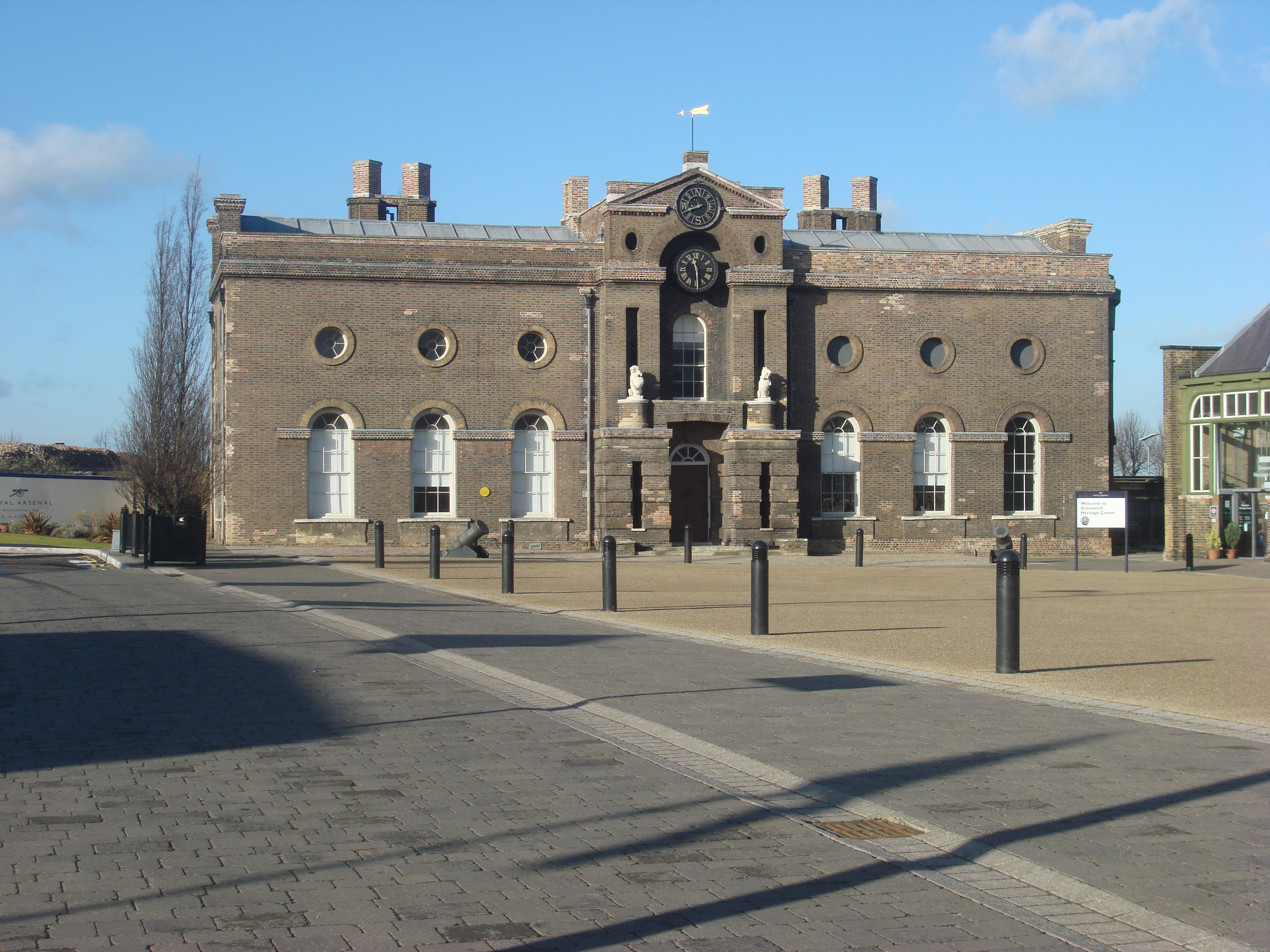
Ordnance Board Building, Woolwich Arsenal, London (attributed to Vanbrugh)

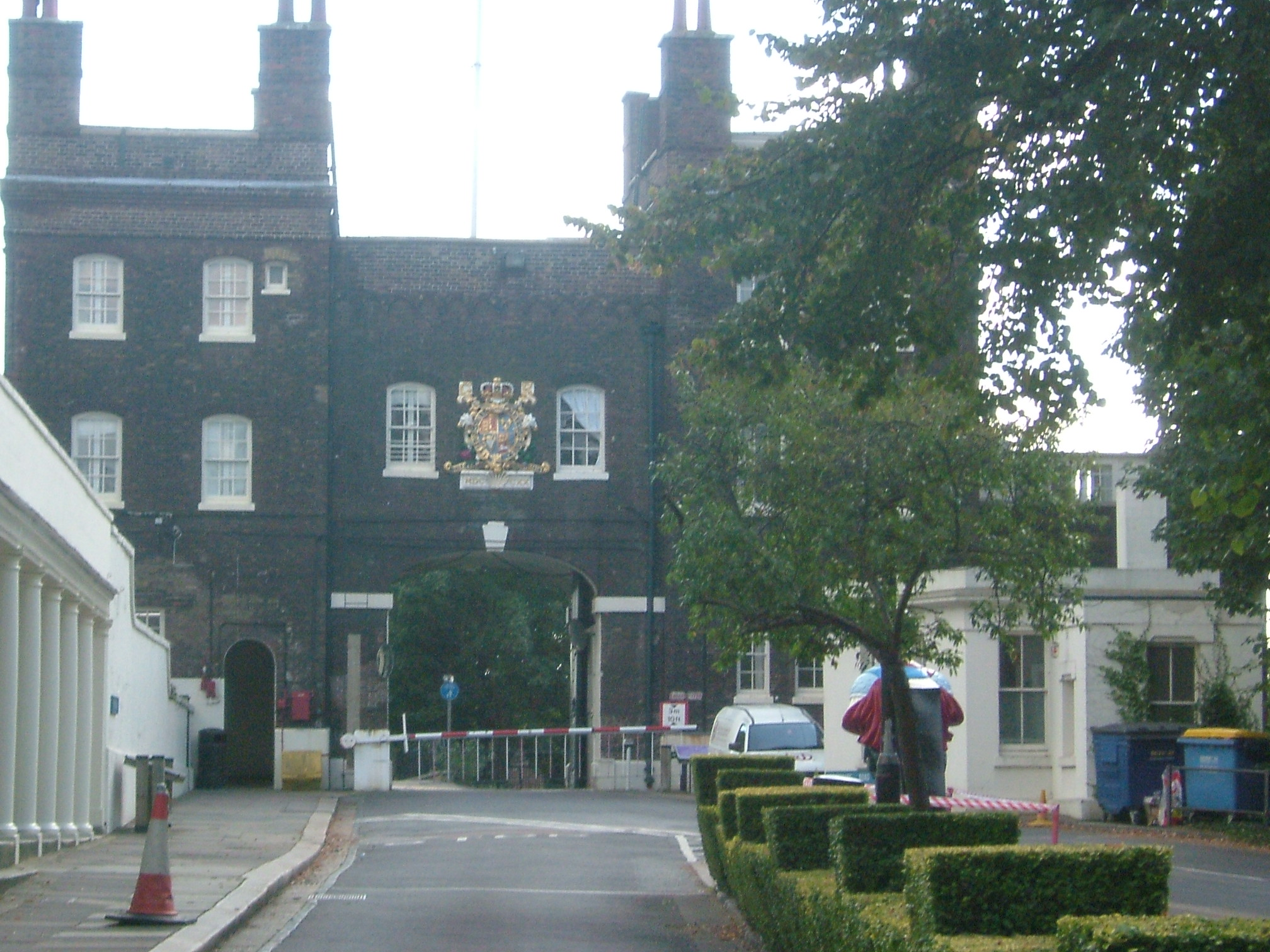
Chatham Dockyard gateway (possibly by Vanbrugh)

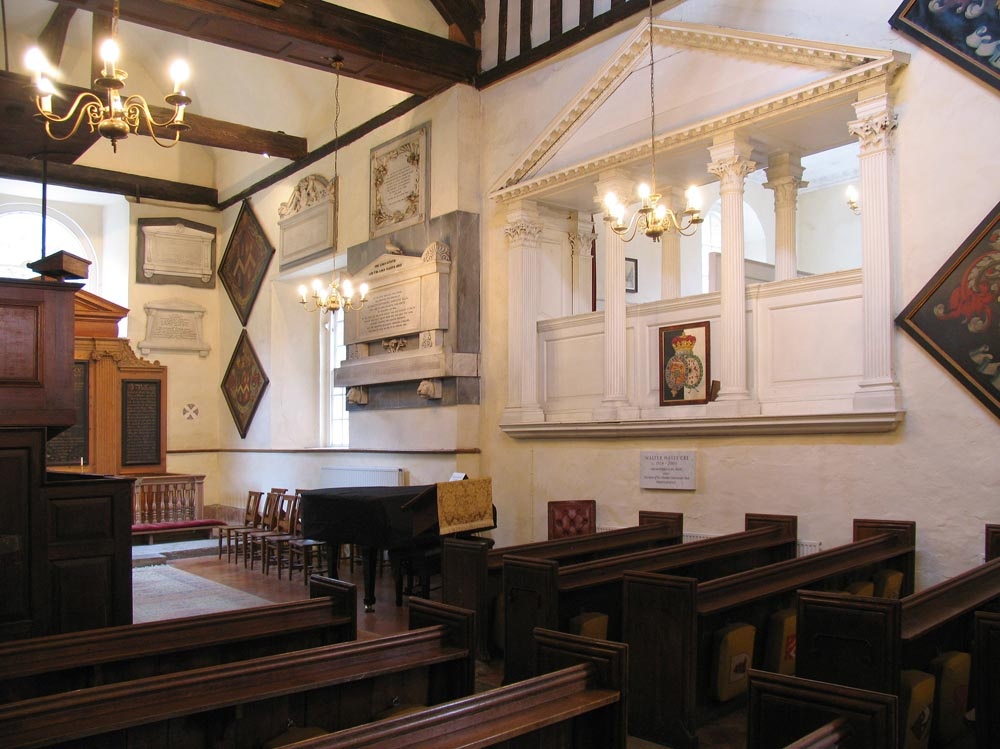
Newcastle Pew, St. George's Church Esher
