= Goose-Pie House =

House in City of Westminster, Greater London, England

Coordinates: 51.5052°N 0.1252°W

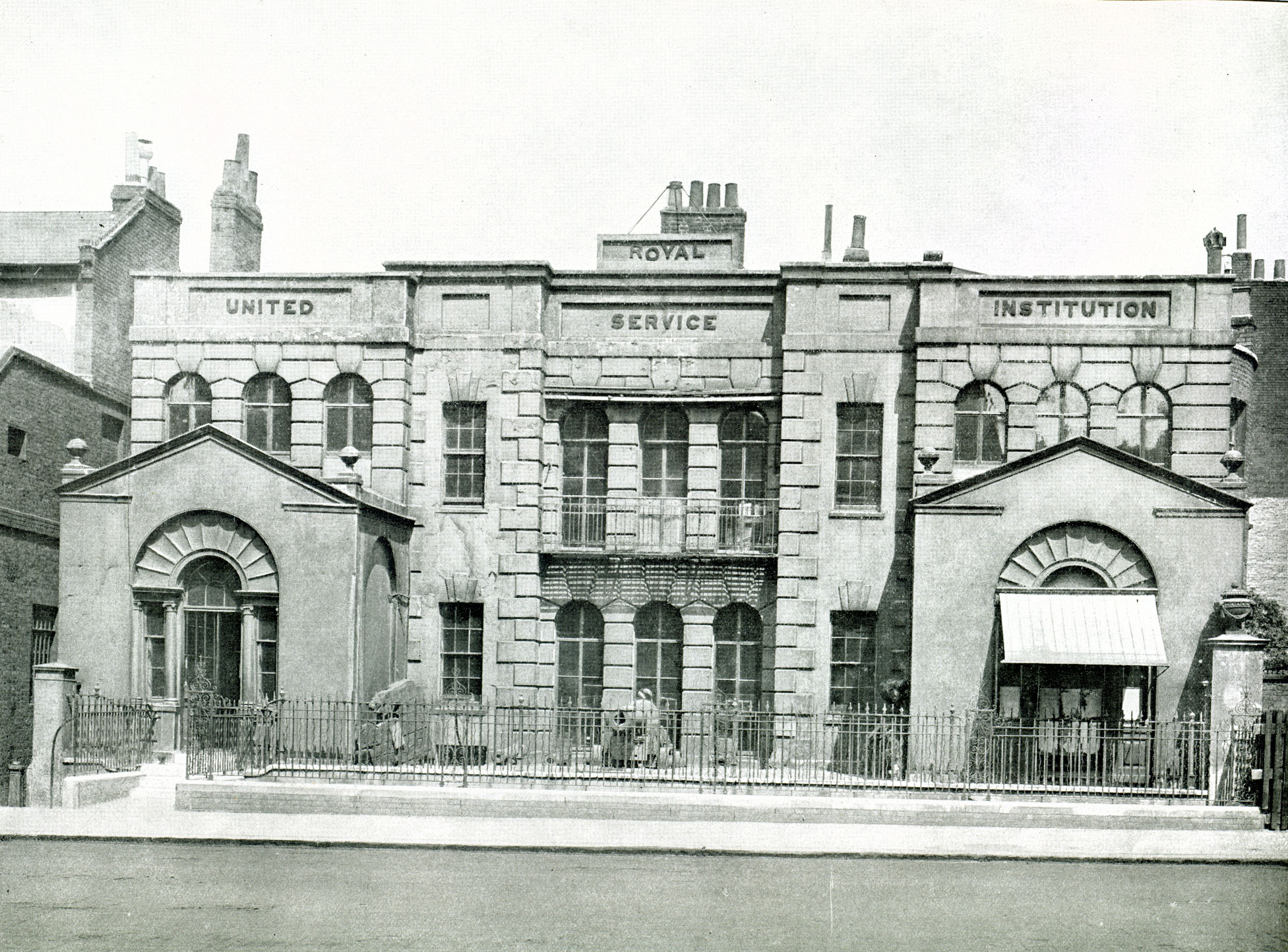
Goose-Pie House, with later lettering

Goose-Pie House was a small English Baroque house built by John Vanbrugh in Whitehall, London, in 1701. The house was demolished in 1898. The site now lies under the southeast corner of the Old War Office Building on Whitehall, near the Gurkha Memorial statue on Horse Guards Avenue.

== Background ==
Vanbrugh made his first essays in architecture earlier in the 1690s, when he was engaged by Charles Howard, 3rd Earl of Carlisle to design his palace at Castle Howard in Yorkshire. Vanbrugh was a well-known playwright, and was friends with the prominent Whigs through his membership of the Kit-Cat Club, but he had no previous formal education in drawing or architectural design.

After most of the Palace of Whitehall was destroyed by a fire in 1698, the King William III granted Vanbrugh permission to build a house in the grounds of the ruined palace in July 1700, in the location where the lodgings of the Vice-Chamberlain – Vanbrugh's friend Peregrine Bertie – had been.

== Description ==
Vanbrugh's small, two-storey house was constructed in 1701 to his own novel design, reusing brick and stone from the ruined palace. It stood on a plot approximately 60 foot (18 m) east to west, fronting the Great Court at Whitehall, and 85 foot (26 m) from north to south.

The house had 7 bays in its main elevation, but departed from the convention of having a main elevation in one plane, with rectangular windows in identical bays. The main block of Vanbrugh's house was formed of five bays. The central three bays were rusticated on the first and second floors, and each floor had three large round-arched windows, spanned by an iron-railed balcony on the first floor. To each side, a further bay projected on both floors, like a tower, with rusticated quoins and rectangular window openings. The outermost bays, in plain ashlars, projected further on the ground floor only, with a broken triangular pediment above an opening with a round-headed arch supported by pillars. The first floor of the outer bays was set back, and built of brick without stone facings.

Although small, the house was in a prominent position, and drew attention to Vanbrugh's architectural aspirations. While conventional town houses of modest size were usually terraced, Vanbrugh's house was free-standing. Its size and proportions, and peculiar design, with unusual mix of elevations and projections, led the house to be unflatteringly likened by Jonathan Swift to a "goose-pie", a dish known for its odd shape. In a poem of 1703, "Vanbrugh's House", Swift wrote: "At length they in the rubbish spy // A thing resembling a goose-pie." The disparaging nickname stuck. (Swift returned to his abuse of Vanbrugh in a poem in 1708, writing: "Van’s genius, without thought or lecture, // Is hugely turn’d to architecture".)

== History ==
Vanbrugh repeated the motif of three long round-headed windows at Castle Howard, and on the corner pavilions at Blenheim Palace. He repeated the rusticated central block with plainer projecting wings at Seaton Delaval Hall.

Vanbrugh died in the house in 1726, and the lease was inherited by his wife. She left the property to her niece Mrs Philippia Goldsworthy for life, and then to her daughter Miss Martha Carolina Goldsworthy, but they sold it to Edward Vanbrugh. The house was acquired by Charles Stuart in 1793, and left to his widow Dame Anna Louisa Stuart. It was occupied by their son, Charles Stuart, 1st Baron Stuart de Rothesay, until it was bought by the United Service Institute in 1845 to expand its adjacent museum. The museum was transferred to the Banqueting House in 1895, and the house was demolished in 1898 to allow construction of the Old War Office Building.

== See also ==
- Vanbrugh House, his house in Esher, built in 1711
- Vanbrugh Castle (1717), his later house at Maze Hill in Greenwich; a small house built by Vanbrugh for his brother in its grounds became known as "Mince-Pie House"
