= Presidents Club =

British charity

Presidents Club Charitable Trust
- Formation: 1985
- Dissolved: 24 January 2018; 8 years ago
- Type: Charity
- Purpose: Hosting an annual charity dinner
- Joint chair: Bruce Ritchie
- Joint chair: David Meller
- Website: thepresidentsclubcharity.co.uk

The Presidents Club Charitable Trust was a British charity known for an annual charity dinner held from 1985 to 2018. The dinner, held usually at The Dorchester hotel in London, was for male guests only and was considered a "mainstay of London's social calendar". After the Financial Times reported on sexual misconduct at the 2018 dinner, the charity announced its intent to disband.

The charitable trust's joint chairmen as of 2018 were the property developer Bruce Ritchie and the businessman and Department for Education director David Meller.

== Charity dinners ==
The 360 guests at the annual dinners, all men, included leading figures in business, entertainment and politics. They would pay for a dinner and participate in auctions of such prizes as meetings with influential people. The proceeds would go to charities, including children's charities, and other organisations, for example the British Olympic Association and Disability Rights International.

In 2008, guests at the dinner organised by Harvey Goldsmith included Jimmy Savile, Justin King, Harold Tillman and Robert Tchenguiz.

In 2010, guests at the dinner organised by Peter Shalson and sponsored by HSBC included Len Blavatnik, Mike Sherwood, Charles Dunstone, Martin Sorrell, Richard Desmond, Bernie Ecclestone, Flavio Briatore, Nick Candy, David Reuben, Gerald Ronson, Howard Shore, Harvey Goldsmith, Jarvis Astaire, Jimmy Lahoud, Dan Wagner and Jimmy Tarbuck.

== 2018 sexual harassment scandal ==
In January 2018, the Financial Times sent two undercover reporters to join the 130 scantily clad "hostesses" specially hired for the event by the Artista agency. It reported that several of the guests had sexually harassed or assaulted the hostesses in the course of the evening. The lead reporter, Madison Marriage, wrote that hostesses were asked to sign a non-disclosure agreement, though without being permitted to read it, and were subsequently subjected to groping, lewd comments, and requests to join guests in their bedrooms, with one hostess asked whether she was a prostitute and one attendee exposing his penis to a hostess. Marriage said that she herself had been groped several times. The event's brochure included a full-page warning that harassment would not be tolerated, and that the Presidents Club would not be liable for it if it did happen.

The report caused a scandal in the United Kingdom, and commentators connected the event to the #MeToo movement, the Harvey Weinstein scandal and resulting allegations indicating frequent sexual abuse of women. Within a day, the Presidents Club announced that it would disband. Some MPs called for the resignation of Children and Families Minister Nadhim Zahawi, who had been among the guests, as well as for a police investigation of the event. Presidents Club co-chairman David Meller resigned from his Department of Education directorship. Jonathan Mendelsohn, another of the guests, was removed from the Labour frontbench in the House of Lords. Several bookshops stopped the sale of books by the comedian David Walliams, who had hosted the event and put up the right to name a character in his next book as a prize. All of these men said to the media that they had neither participated in nor witnessed any misconduct.

The guest list of the 2018 dinner included the following other notable men (although they did not necessarily attend):

- Liam Botham, rugby player
- Richard Caring, businessman
- Gino D'Acampo, celebrity chef
- Christopher Evans, biotechnology entrepreneur
- Philip Green, retail executive
- George Holmes, university executive
- Peter Jones, Dragons' Den star
- Vernon Kay, TV presenter
- Jimmy Lahoud, restaurateur
- Brett Palos, property developer
- Theo Paphitis, Dragons' Den star
- Harry Primrose, Lord Dalmeny, deputy chairman of Sotheby's UK
- Rami Ranger, founder of Sun Mark
- Bruce Ritchie, property developer
- Peter Shalson, property developer
- Tim Steiner, co-founder and CEO of Ocado
- Touker Suleyman, fashion entrepreneur
- Robert Tchenguiz, businessman
- Ceawlin Thynn, Viscount Weymouth, businessman
- Dan Wagner, Internet entrepreneur
- Poju Zabludowicz, businessman
