= Bruce Ritchie =

British property developer (born 1965)

- Born: Bruce Weir Ritchie; February 1965 (age 61)
- Education: Dulwich College
- Occupation: Property Investor
- Title: Founder, owner and Chief Executive Officer, Residential Land
- Spouse: Shadi Ritchie
- Children: 2
- Father: David Ritchie

Bruce Weir Ritchie (born February 1965) is a British property developer and residential landlord, and the owner of the Residential Land Group.

== Early life ==
Ritchie was born in February 1965. He was educated at Dulwich College where he was a contemporary of Nigel Farage. He is the son of professor H. David Ritchie, a leading surgeon in the 1980s at the Royal London Hospital and Dean of the Medical College. His mother is Jennifer Prentice, a former State School Teacher who is daughter of GS Prentice, the former Mayor of Birkenhead and driving force behind the Mersey Tunnel Committee.

Ritchie was brought up in Dulwich, South London, alongside two older brothers, Sir Andrew Ritchie KC and Scientist and Mathematician Gordon Ritchie, both alumni of Magdalene College, Cambridge.

== Career ==
Ritchie left school after A-levels and joined Harrods, becoming a management trainee. He bought his first properties whilst still working for Harrods. In 1991, Ritchie founded Residential Land.

The company grew strongly in the 1990s and 2000s and as of 2024 the group of companies owns over 1,000 privately-rented properties in Prime Central London, including the Mayfair area and is based in Grosvenor Street.

In the early 2000s, Ritchie had a business partnership with the chef Marco Pierre White and his business partner Jimmy Lahoud in relation to a group of Prime Central London restaurants. The restaurants were highly successful, and at one point had been awarded eight Michelin Stars.

In April 2012, Ritchie and Residential Land agreed an initial £320 million joint venture to own, develop and invest in Prime Central London property which was planned to grow to a value in excess of £1 billion.

In 2012, Residential Land was named Landlord of the Year at the Property Week RESI Awards. Then in 2016, Residential Land was named Asset Manager of the Year at the 2016 RESI Awards. In May 2016, Ritchie was named Entrepreneur of the Year at the PROPS Awards, a UK property industry awards event.

In July 2017, he was ranked 28th in Property Week’s annual Power 100 list, having been described as a ‘consummate dealmaker’.

In December 2023 Ivanhoe Cambridge and Residential Land continued their partnership by refinancing their joint venture through a £465 million sustainability linked loan through HSBC and OCBC.

== Politics ==
Ritchie has been a staunch supporter of the Conservative Party throughout his life. In 2013, he and his wife Shadi donated £111,600 to the Conservative Party. As of 2018, the two had given the Conservative Party more than £750,000 personally and through Residential Land.

== Philanthropy ==
Ritchie and his wife Shadi were event Chairs for the Elton John AIDS Foundation. He was part of the committee that helped launch the first ever Midsummer Party in July 2019, which raised £4.8 million.

In 2020, Ritchie donated £50,000 to the Mail Force Charity campaign to improve deliveries of PPE during the COVID-19 pandemic.

Ritchie was one of the co-chairmen of the Presidents Club Charitable Trust, which wound down its operations in 2024. The charity, which assisted under-privileged and disadvantaged children across multiple charities, had its activities disrupted by a journalist’s unproven allegations of inappropriate behaviour of some unidentified guests at its 2018 charity dinner. Both the Charity Commission and Fundraising Regulator investigated the event and called for complaints or evidence, none were received.
