= BBC Sports Personality of the Year Helen Rollason Award =

Award for sport personalities with health problems

- Country: United Kingdom
- Presented by: BBC Sports Personality of the Year
- First award: 1999; 27 years ago
- Most recent winner: Sergio Aguiar; David Stancombe (2025)

The BBC Sports Personality of the Year Helen Rollason Award is an award given annually as part of the BBC Sports Personality of the Year ceremony each December. The award is given “for outstanding achievement in the face of adversity”, and BBC Sport selects the winner.

The award is named after the BBC sports presenter Helen Rollason, who died in August 1999 at the age of 43 after suffering from cancer for two years. Helen Rollason was the first female presenter of Grandstand. After being diagnosed with cancer, she helped raise over £5 million to set up a cancer wing at the North Middlesex Hospital, where she received most of her treatment.

== History ==
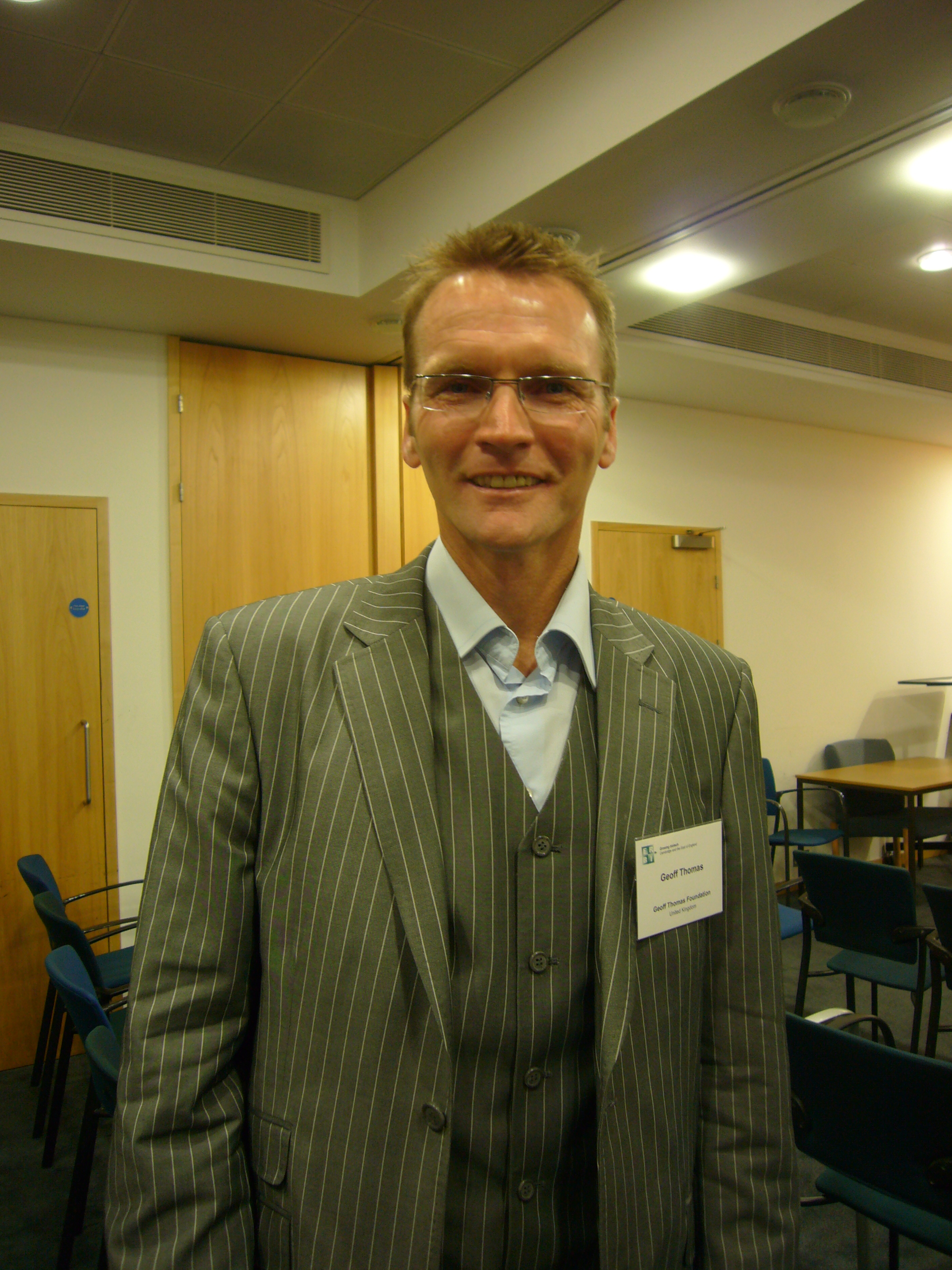
Ex-footballer Geoff Thomas, who won the award in 2005

The inaugural recipient of the award was horse trainer Jenny Pitman, in 1999. Other winners include South African Paralympic sprinter Oscar Pistorius, who won the award in 2007. Several recipients have not played a sport professionally, including Jane Tomlinson, who won in 2002, Kirsty Howard (2004), Phil Packer (2009), Anne Williams, who received the award posthumously in 2013, and eight-year-old Bailey Matthews (2015). Michael Watson, who won the award in 2003, had a career in boxing but was paralysed and almost killed in a title bout with Chris Eubank. He won the award for completing the London Marathon, an accomplishment that took him six days. Former footballer Geoff Thomas won the award in 2005; he raised money by cycling the 2,200 miles (3,540.56 km) of the 2005 Tour de France course in the same number of days as the professionals completed it. In 2006, Paul Hunter posthumously received the award; he died from dozens of malignant neuroendocrine tumours – his widow Lindsay accepted the award on his behalf.

== Winners ==
=== By year ===
BBC Sports Personality of the Year Helen Rollason Award winners
Year	Nat.	Winner	Sport(s)	Rationale	Note
1999	ENG	Jenny Pitman	Horse racing	for "one of national hunt's greatest trainers" who retired earlier in 1999 after suffering from cancer.	
2000	WAL	Tanni Grey-Thompson	Athletics	for winning "gold in the 100 m, 200 m, 400 m and 800 m events" at the 2000 Summer Paralympics.	
2001	ENG	Ellen MacArthur	Sailing	for her courage in becoming fastest woman to circumnavigate the globe.	
2002	ENG	Jane Tomlinson	—^{[n 1]}	for completing "the London Marathon, a triathlon and the Great North Run" and raising money for Cancer Research, after being diagnosed with breast cancer.	
2003	ENG	Michael Watson	Boxing	for completing the London Marathon and "raising millions of pounds for the Brain and Spine Foundation", despite being told previously that "he would never walk again".	
2004	ENG	Kirsty Howard	—^{[n 2]}	for raising money for poorly children in Francis House hospice through Kirsty's Appeal, despite having an inoperable heart condition.	
2005	ENG	Geoff Thomas	Football	for raising "more than £150,000 for the Leukaemia Research charity" by cycling, following his own battle with the disease.	
2006	ENG	Paul Hunter	Snooker	awarded posthumously "in recognition of his bravery and determination to continue playing while trying to beat [cancer]."	
2007	RSA	Oscar Pistorius	Athletics	for his fight to be allowed to "race in both the Olympics and the Paralympics" in 2008.	
2008	ENG	Alastair Hignell	Cricket, Rugby union	for fundraising and raising awareness of multiple sclerosis since being diagnosed with the disease in 1999.	
2009	ENG	Major Phil Packer	—^{[n 3]}	for fundraising over £1.2 million for the Help for Heroes charity, despite being paraplegic since sustaining injuries in the Iraq War.	
2010	ENG	Frank Williams	Formula One	for founding the Williams Formula One team which has so far won nine constructors' titles and seven drivers' championships despite himself suffering an accident in 1986 in which he sustained a severe spinal cord injury.	
2011	ENG	Bob Champion	Horse racing	for beating cancer then winning the 1981 Grand National on Aldaniti, then raising money for The Bob Champion Cancer Trust.	
2012	ENG	Martine Wright	Sitting volleyball	for achieving selection for GB Sitting Volleyball team at the 2012 Summer Paralympics, having been "the most seriously injured person to survive" the 7/7 bombings the day after London was announced as host of those Games.	
2013	ENG	Anne Williams	—	awarded posthumously for campaigning for justice for Hillsborough victims.	
2014	14 countries	Invictus Games Competitors	Disability sport	awarded for the central contributions to the success of inaugural multi-sport events for injured military personnel.	
2015	ENG	Bailey Matthews	Triathlon	8-year-old Bailey, who has cerebral palsy, completed his first triathlon earlier in the year, throwing away his walking frame to complete the last 20 yards of the final running event on his own	
2016	ENG	Ben Smith	Running	for running 401 marathons in 401 days in order to raise funds and awareness for two anti bullying charities, Kidscape and Stonewall, inspiring thousands of people along the way including school children to whom he spoke and people who ran with him.	
2017	ENG	Bradley Lowery	—	awarded posthumously after he "captured hearts across the sporting world" during appearances as a mascot, while he had neuroblastoma; accepted by the Lowery family.	
2018	ENG	Billy Monger	Motorsport	For returning to racing after a double leg amputation following a crash.	
2019	SCO	Doddie Weir	Rugby union	For raising awareness of motor neurone disease through his charitable foundation.	
2020	ENG	Captain Sir Thomas Moore	Walking	For his fundraising efforts in aid of NHS Charities Together, raising over £30 million by walking 100 laps of his 25-metre garden before his 100th birthday.	
2021	SCO	Jen Beattie	Football	For continuing to play for both club and country after being diagnosed with breast cancer.	
2022	ENG	Rob Burrow	Rugby league	For raising awareness of and fundraising for motor neurone disease	
2023	ENG	Fatima Whitbread	Athletics	For her campaigning for children and those in the care system, after she spent the first fourteen years of her life in a children's home.	
2024	ENG	Mark Prince	Boxing	Recognition for his work at the Kiyan Prince Foundation, a charity he founded in memory of his son, that uses boxing to deter people from getting involved in knife crime	
2025	ENG	Sergio Aguiar and David Stancombe			

=== By nationality ===
This table lists the total number of awards won by recipients of each nationality, based on the principle of jus soli.

Winners by nationality
Nationality	Number of wins
England	22
Scotland	2
South Africa	1
Wales	1

=== By sport ===
This table lists the total number of awards won by recipients' sporting profession.

Winners by sport
Sporting profession	Number of wins^{[n 4]}
Athletics	3
Football	2
Horse racing	2
Boxing	2
Disability multi-sport	1
Formula One	1
Sailing	1
Snooker	1
Sitting volleyball	1
Cricket	½
Rugby league	1
Rugby union	1½
Triathlon	1
Other	6

== Notes ==
- ^{n 1} Jane Tomlinson was an amateur athlete who competed in marathons, and triathlons – these represent sporting disciplines of athletics, swimming, and cycling.
- ^{n 2} Kirsty Howard was the mascot accompanying David Beckham for the FIFA World Cup qualifier against Greece and later became the final carrier in the Queen's Baton Relay for the 2002 Commonwealth Games.
- ^{n 3} Major Phil Packer raised money by rowing across the English Channel, completing the London Marathon, and climbing.
- ^{n 4} The fractions refer to Alastair Hignell, who played cricket professionally and rugby union at the top level.
