= Upper Feilde =

Mansion block in London

Coordinates: 51.51167°N 0.15520°W

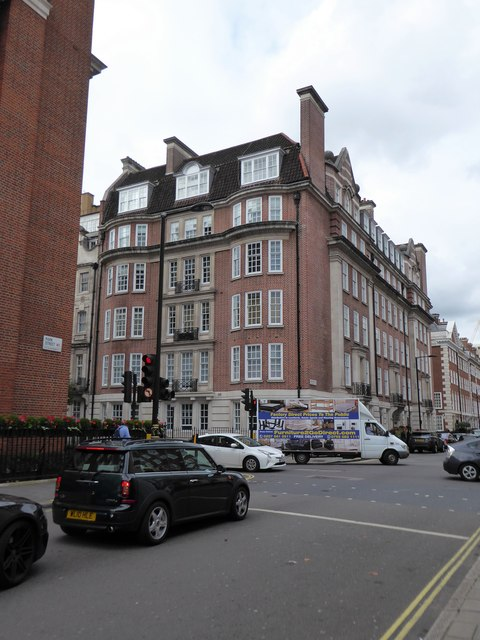
Upper Feilde as seen from the southeast.

Upper Feilde is a mansion block in Mayfair, London located on Park Street, and Upper Brook Street.

== History ==
The block was part of a larger development in the area designed by Wimperis and Simpson and completed between 1922 and 1924 by Higgs and Hill. It is built in neo-Georgian style and rendered in Portland Stone and brick.

== See also ==
- Brook Street, London
- Park Street, Mayfair
- Audley Mansions
