= Little Doha =

Area of Mayfair, London, with many Qatari-owned properties

"Little Doha" is the nickname given to an area of Mayfair in central London that has a high concentration of properties owned by the Al-Thani family, the ruling family of Qatar, and their relatives and associates. By 2006, Qatari interests owned £1 billion of property in London, and a quarter of Mayfair's 279 acres. As well as housing and commercial property, they own two of the area's most well-known luxury hotels, The Connaught and Claridge's.

== Nomenclature and location ==
The nickname derives from Doha, the capital of Qatar. The area has also been called a "Qatari quarter" and 'Qataropolis'. The area is located in the north-western part of Mayfair. the area is bordered to the west by Hyde Park and Park Lane and to the north by North Row. Carlos Place, Duke Street and Grosvenor Square form an eastern border and the southernmost point is marked by the Dorchester Hotel and South Street.

== Properties ==
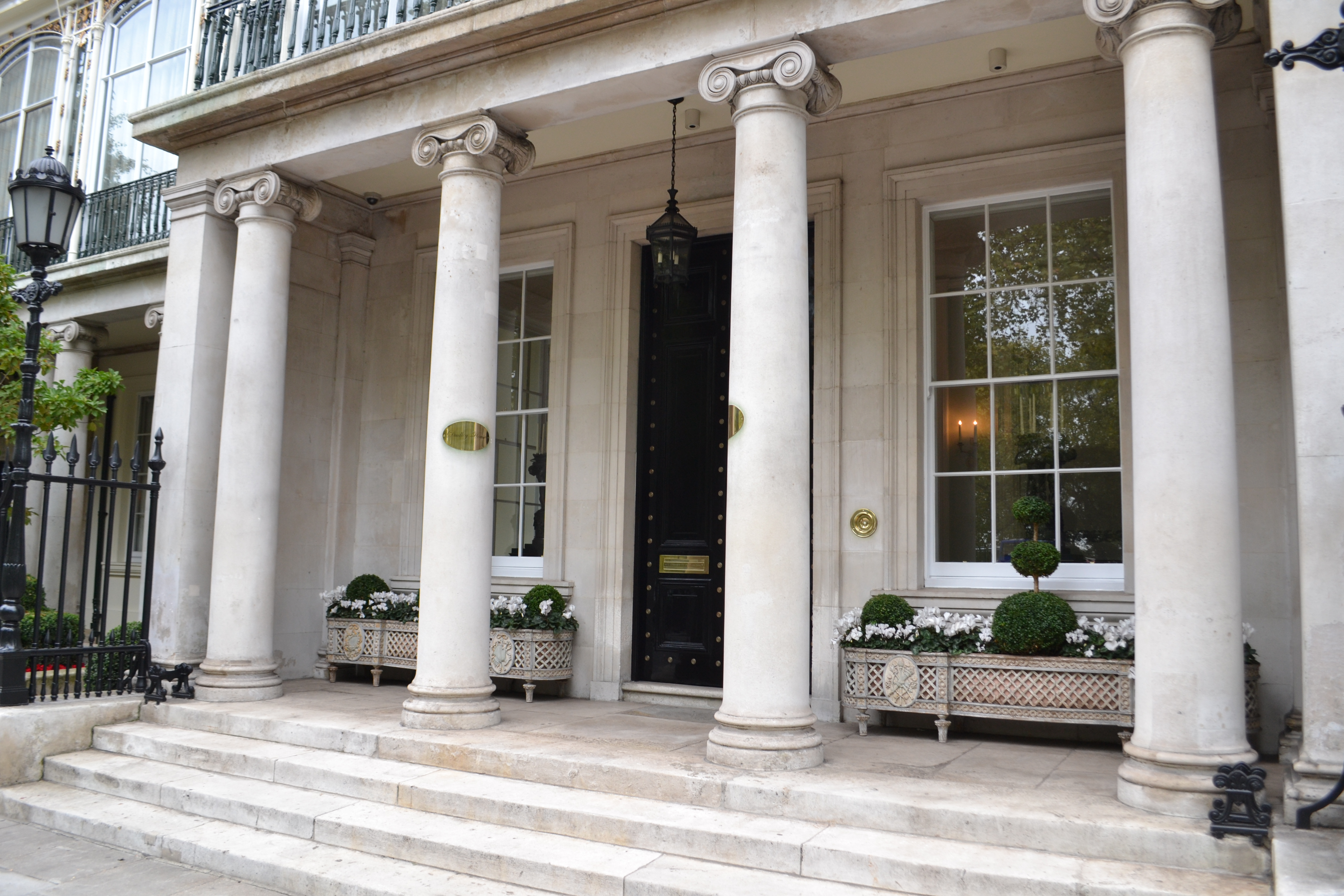
Portico of Dudley House

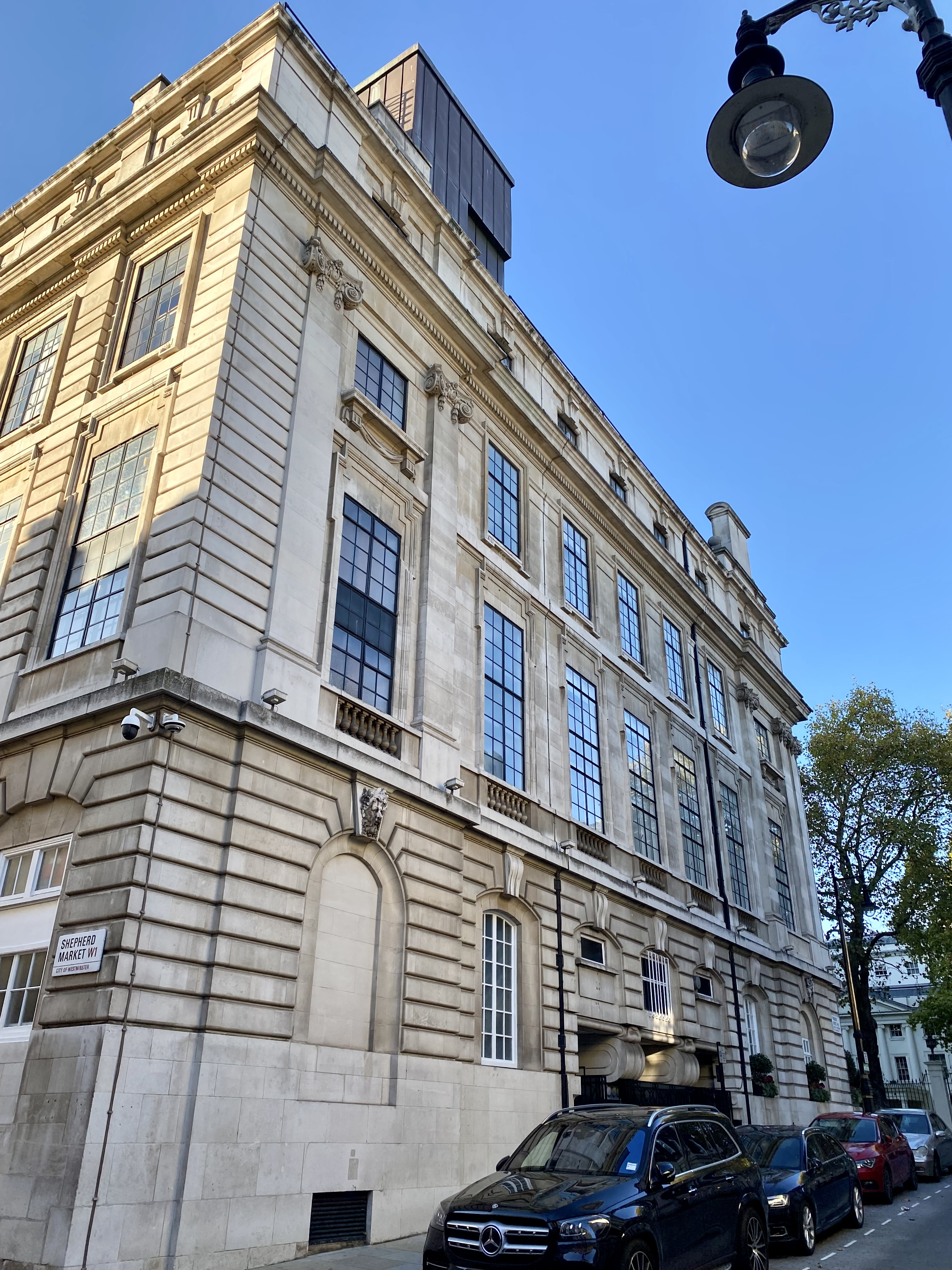
Lombard House, Curzon Street

Dudley House on Park Lane was bought in 2006 by the Bahamian-based company Bristol Isles Ltd for £37 million and restored by Hamad bin Abdullah Al-Thani, a cousin of the Emir of Qatar, Tamim bin Hamad Al Thani. By May 2006 Qataris owned £1 billion of property in London and a quarter of the 279 acres of Mayfair.

The family bought 79 Mount Street, a 10,000 square foot house in Mount Street in Mayfair for £40 million in May 2015. The former embassy of Brazil at 32 Green Street, was bought in 2011. Other Mayfair purchases include a house on Davies Street for £12 million and a house on Park Street for £13 million. The Connaught and Claridge's hotels in Mayfair are owned by the Maybourne Hotel Group, whose Qatari ultimate beneficial owners are Hamad bin Khalifa al-Thani, the former emir of Qatar, and the former prime minister Hamad bin Jassim bin Jaber Al Thani. Jaber Al Thani's British business interests are run from 67 Brook Street in Mayfair. The most expensive London mews house ever sold, in Reeves Mews in Mayfair, was bought by the former deputy prime minister of Qatar, Abdullah bin Hamad Al Attiyah in 2015. In 1997 Lombard House (formerly Sunderland House) on Curzon Street was bought by the deputy prime minister of Qatar, Mohammed bin Khalifa Al Thani for £17 million. It is valued at £180 million.

The Evening Standard newspaper described the early 2010s purchases as an "unprecedented property buying bonanza".
