= 79 Mount Street =

House in Mayfair, London, England

Coordinates: 51.5092°N 0.1528°W

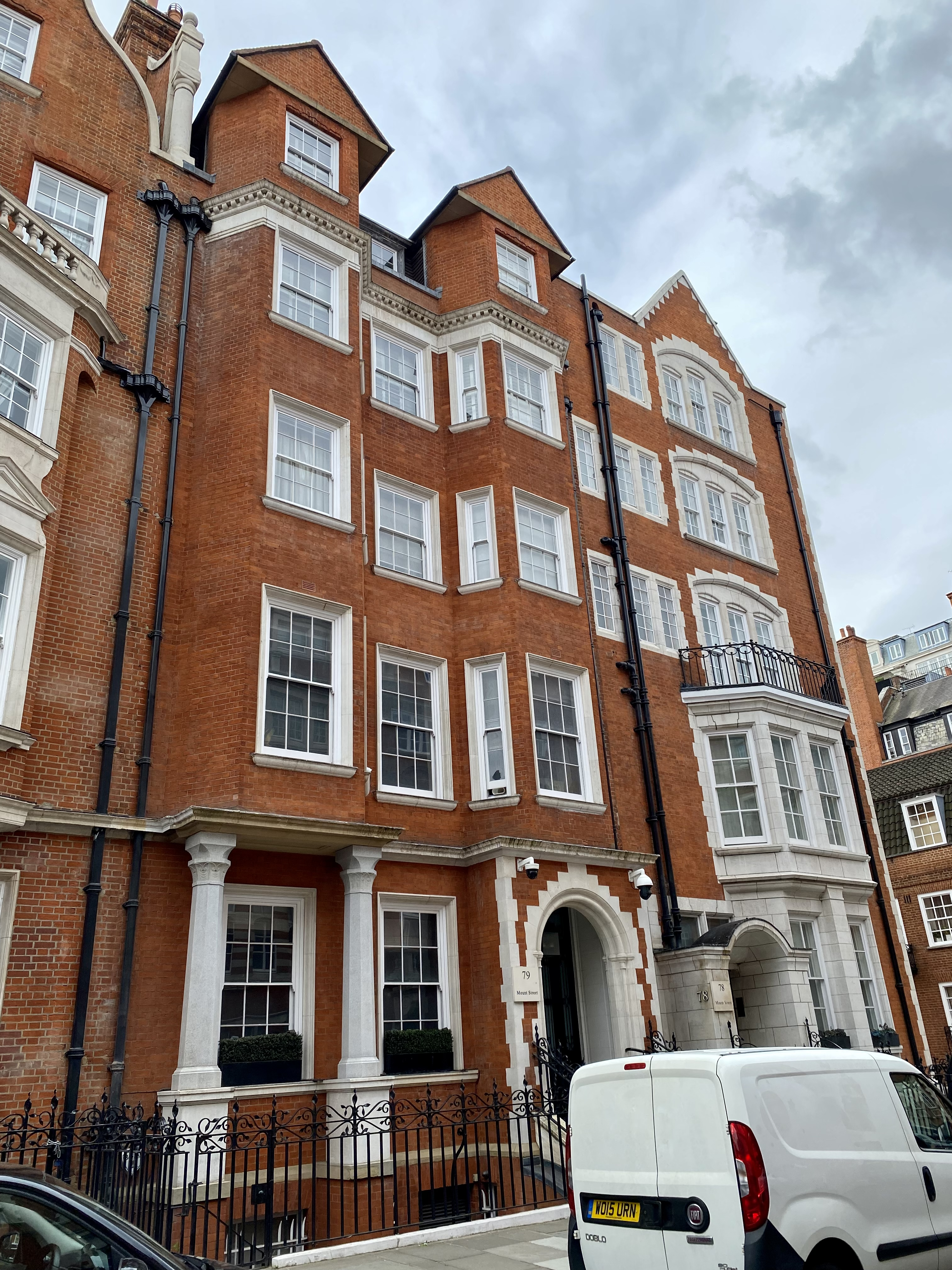
79 Mount Street in 2023

79 Mount Street is a house in Mount Street, Mayfair, London W1.

== History ==
The house was built in 1892–1894 by Eustace Balfour and Hugh Thackeray Turner of Balfour and Turner, in "Free Style Queen Anne", or in an Arts and Crafts style. In the 1930s, it was home to John Powys, 5th Baron Lilford. In 2008, it was refurbished by the Meller family, who used the upper floors as a home and the basement to second floors as offices, with a swimming pool built in the basement. In May 2015, British businessman David Meller sold the 10,000 sq ft six-storey house to the Qatari royal family for £40 million, as part of a growing "Qatari quarter" centred on Dudley House in nearby Park Lane. It has been listed Grade II on the National Heritage List for England since December 2017.
