= Bailey Matthews =

British schoolboy, from Worksop (born 2006)

- Born: 2006 (age 19–20)
- Known for: Sporting achievements
- Family: Finlay Matthews (Brother)
- Awards: Pride of Britain Award (2015); Helen Rollason Award (2015); Bassetlaw Community Award Special Award (2015); Yorkshire Awards (2015); Yorkshire Young Achievers Awards (2015); Redlands Outstanding Achievement Award (2018); British Citizen Youth Award BCyA; Child of Britain Award (2022)

Bailey Matthews (born 2006) is a British schoolboy, from Worksop, who has won awards for his sporting achievements in the face of his cerebral palsy. Matthews made international headlines in 2015 after completing his first junior triathlon (a 100 m (110 yd) swim, then a 4 km (2.5 miles) bike ride, ending with a 1.3 km (0.81 miles) run), at Castle Howard in July 2015, after throwing away his walking frame to complete the last 18 metres (20 yd) of the final section on his own, despite stumbling twice. A video of the moment, captured by a spectator, went viral, being viewed more than 27 million times on Facebook.

Bailey Matthews received a Pride of Britain Award and numerous other awards, and in December the same year, he was presented with the BBC Sports Personality of the Year Helen Rollason Award at a ceremony in Belfast.
