= Great Cumberland Place =

Street in the City of Westminster, London

Coordinates: 51.5150°N 0.1597°W

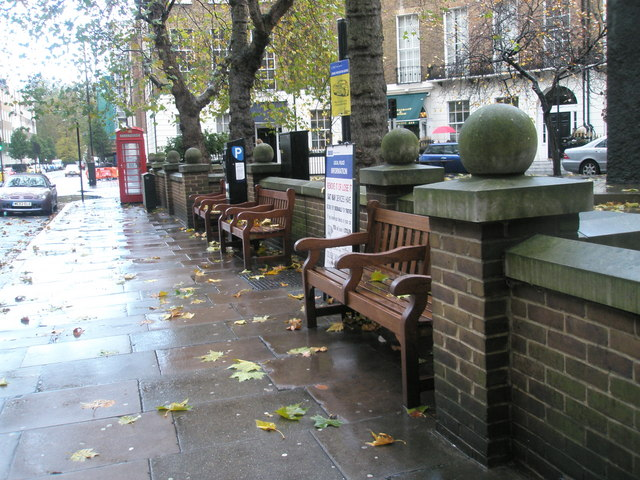
Benches on Great Cumberland Place.

Great Cumberland Place is a street in the City of Westminster, part of Greater London, England.

It includes the former Great Cumberland Street, which was re-numbered as part of it.

== Description ==
The street runs from Oxford Street at Marble Arch to George Street at Bryanston Square.

It contains the Western Marble Arch Synagogue, near which stands a statue of Raoul Wallenberg.

Great Cumberland Place is one of the four streets the Cumberland Hotel fronts onto, and gives it its name.

== Notable residents ==
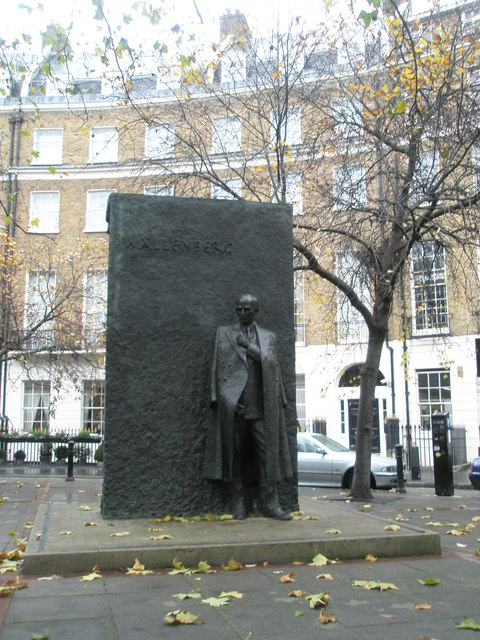
Statue of Wallenberg

In the 1790s, Thomas Pinckney lived in the street while he was the United States ambassador to the Court of St James's.

Sir James Mackintosh lived in Great Cumberland Street, which was later re-numbered as part of Great Cumberland Place.

The residents listed in 1833 were: "Hans Busk, Esq.; Sir Clifford Constable; Sir Frederick Hamilton; Lady C. Underwood; Sir G. Ivison Tapps; Baron Bülow (the Prussian Minister); General Sir R. M'Farlane; Leonard Currie, Esq.; Sir S. B. Fludyer, Bart.; Lady Trollope; Earl of Leitrim; Sir Alexander Johnston; and the Hon. and Right Rev. the Lord Bishop of Norwich", and in Great Cumberland Street "Lord Saltoun; Mrs. Portman; John Wells, Esq.; Colonel Sherwood; Captain Richard Manby; John Lodge, Esq.; Major Murray; Robert Cutlar Fergusson, Esq.; John N. McLeod, Esq.; and Lord Bagot".

The explorers James Theodore Bent and Mabel Bent lived first at Number 43 and then Number 13 Great Cumberland Place from the early 1880s until Mabel Bent's death in 1929.

The arts consultant and administrator Adrian Ward-Jackson lived in a one-bedroom flat at No. 37 in the 1980s.
