= Audley Mansions =

Mansion block in London

Coordinates: 51.50963°N 0.15208°W

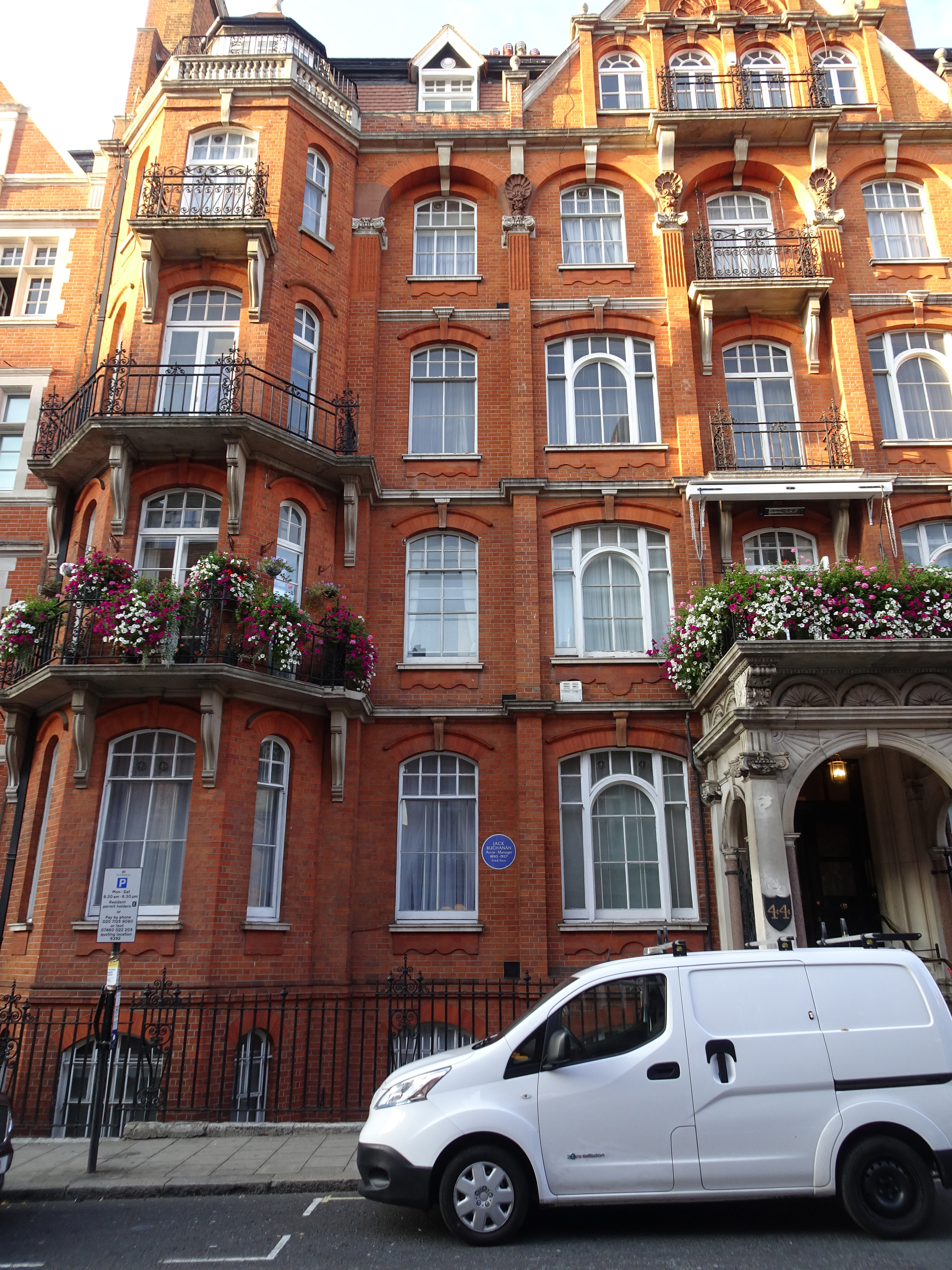
The south side of Audley Mansions

Audley Mansions is a mansion block in Mayfair, London located on the corner of South Audley Street and Mount Street.

== History ==
The block is residential, designed by J. T. Wimperis, a speculative venture intended to be luxury in character with "first-class" units. It was designed in Queen Anne style and rendered in red brick with Portland Stone dressings. Construction was carried out by William Brass and Son between 1884 and 1886.

The building has a blue plaque dedicated to Jack Buchanan, who lived in Audley Mansions.

== See also ==
- South Audley Street
- Mount Street, London
- Upper Feilde
