= Adrian Ward-Jackson =

British art dealer (1950–1991)

Adrian Alexander Ward-Jackson CBE (6 June 1950 – 23 August 1991) was an English art dealer and consultant and arts administrator. He assisted the Getty Museum and the collector Barbara Piasecka Johnson in their acquisition of art at auction. Ward-Jackson became a prominent figure in dance administration with the Arts Council of Great Britain and the Rambert Dance Company before his death from AIDS in 1991.

== Life ==
Ward-Jackson was born on 6 June 1950 to the journalist and writer William Alexander Ward-Jackson and Catherine Elizabeth Ward-Jackson (née Trew). He attended Westminster School between 1964 and 1968. He was a member of the Turf Club. His flats at 120 Mount Street in Mayfair and 37 Great Cumberland Place in Marylebone became the scenes of great dinner parties with notable guests from arts and politics. His obituary in The Times described the decor of his flat in Mount Street as being "filled with a profusion of colour and pattern, enlivened by Renaissance bronzes, wonderful objets d'art and extraordinary French engravings of portraits and landscapes. It offered an almost perfect model of how to live with and among art, had one the will and the money to do so".

Ward-Jackson was appointed CBE for services to the performing arts in the 1991 New Year Honours. He was a member of the jury that decided the 1991 Turner Prize.

== Dance ==
Ward-Jackson was passionate about ballet; his obituary in the Daily Telegraph described him as working "tirelessly in the beleaguered world of dance". He hosted many fundraising events, with several attended by Diana, Princess of Wales, and Princess Margaret, Countess of Snowdon.

He was the chairman of the dance panel of the Arts Council of Great Britain from 1990 to 1991. He was a governor of the Royal Ballet and chairman of the Rambert Dance Company from 1985 to 1990. He also served as the director of the Royal Opera House Trust from 1987 to 1991 and as vice-chairman of the Contemporary Arts Society from 1988 to 1991. Ward-Jackson resigned from the Arts Council in May 1991 due to his worsening illness. Peter Palumbo, Baron Palumbo said that Ward-Jackson would be mourned by the dance world as a "friend, a passionate advocate and a tireless worker" and that he bought a "a vitality, a purpose, a sense of mission, a commitment, an enthusiasm and a huge knowledge of the subject that can seldom if ever have been equalled".

== Career ==
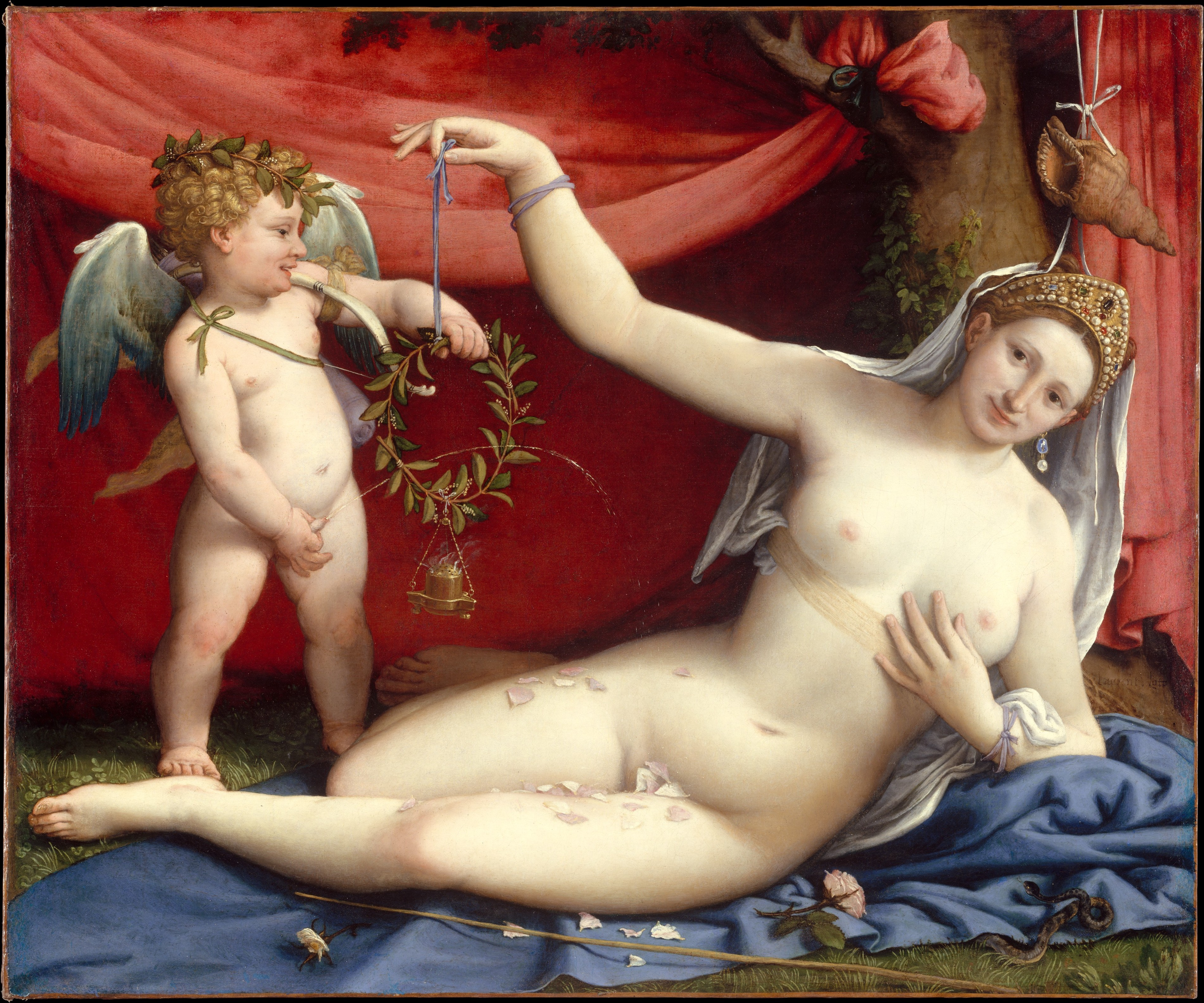
Lotto's Venus and Cupid c.1520. Discovered by Ward-Jackson in a Swiss private collection and bought by the Metropolitan Museum in 1986.

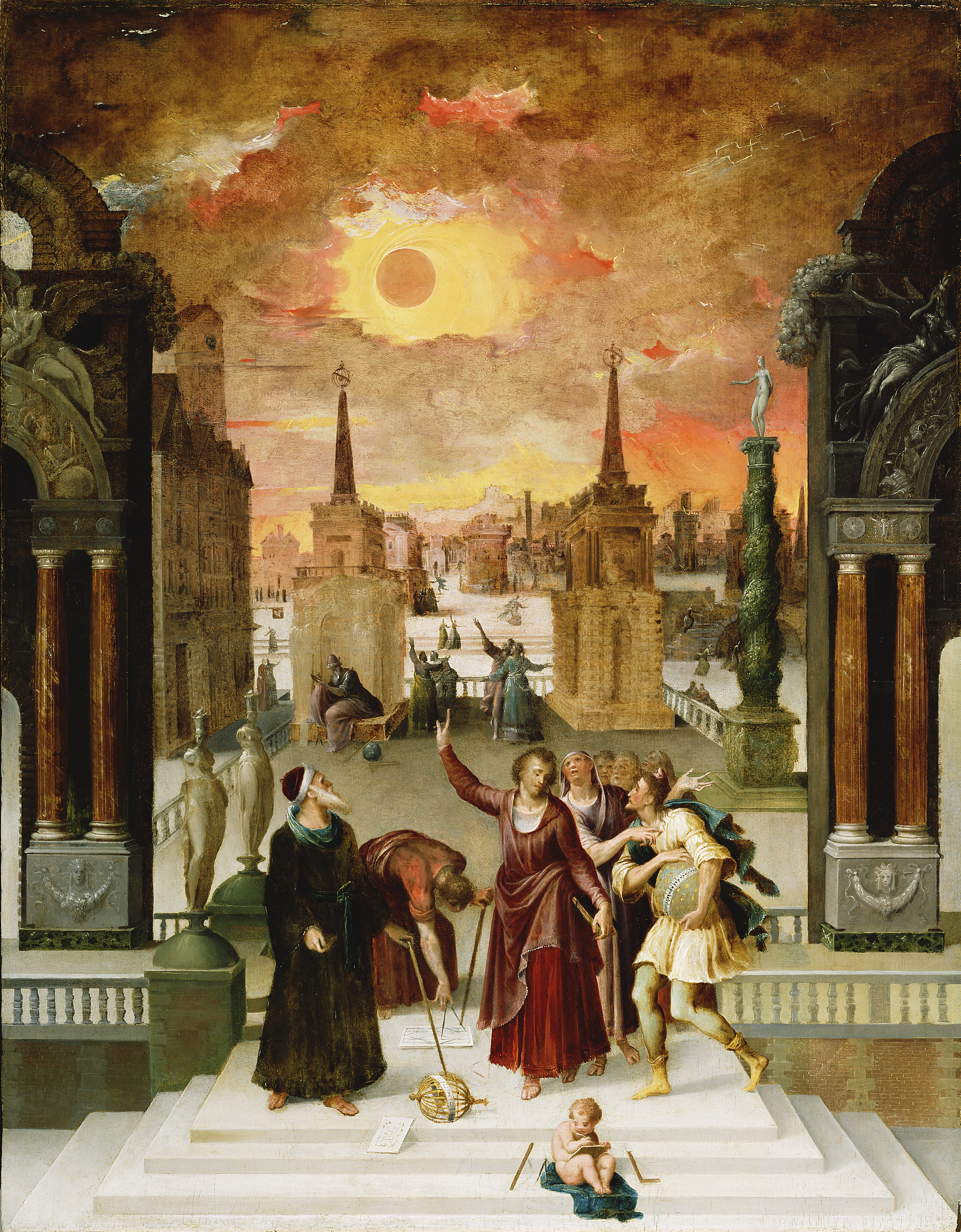
Caron's Dionysius the Areopagite Converting the Pagan Philosophers, bought by the Getty Museum with the assistance of Ward-Jackson in 1985.

In 1971 Ward-Jackson was appointed a director of Colnaghi's by Jacob Rothschild, having previously been an expert in the drawings department of Christie's auction house. He studied art in Vienna in the early 1970s as a research assistant at the drawing cabinet of the Albertina. He was the chairman and director of his own firm, Adrian Ward-Jackson Ltd, from 1975 until his death. In his career as an art dealer Ward-Jackson bought several notable pieces at auction. He frequently bought pieces on behalf of major institutions such as the Getty Museum in California and major collectors such as the heiress Barbara Piasecka Johnson. Piasecka Johnson's obituary in The Art Newspaper described Ward-Jackson and fellow dealer Harry Bailey as being the "gatekeepers of [Piasecka Johnson's] existence, selling to her, introducing approved dealers and fluffing up her social life". His obituary in The Times wrote of him that "Behind the scenes he did place major paintings and drawings coming out of private hands into the world's great museums; but his most characteristic accomplishment was the making of great private collections".

In November 1976 at Christie's he bought the drawings Sacra Conversazione by Vittore Carpaccio for £78,000 and Giovanni Francesco Maineri's A Pagan Sacrifice for £48,000. He paid £35,000 for François Boucher's chalk study of Apollo in April 1978. In December 1986 he bought a 17th-century Baroque marble bust of the French general François-Henri de Montmorency, duc de Luxembourg for £423,000 (equivalent to £1,263,435 in 2025).

At the sale of the contents of Godmersham Park in June 1983 Ward-Jackson paid £144,400 for a Gothic tapestry (equivalent to £490,963 in 2025) and paid £15,120 (equivalent to £51,408 in 2025) for a pair of 18th-century English tapestry cushions decorated with flowers and fruit. This established a new price record for a cushion.

In May 1985 Ward-Jackson handled the Getty Museum's purchase of Antoine Caron's Dionysius the Areopagite Converting the Pagan Philosophers from the collection of Anthony Blunt for £250,000. In November 1986 he again acted for them in their purchase for £2.5 million (equivalent to £7,467,111 in 2025) of a page of notes by Leonardo da Vinci from the collection of John R. Gaines of the Gaines-Burgers dog food fortune.

Ward-Jackson discovered Lorenzo Lotto's Venus and Cupid in a Swiss collection which was subsequently purchased by the Metropolitan Museum in New York in July 1986 for $3 million (equivalent to $8,811,475 in 2025).

Ward-Jackson also acquired pieces for the Contemporary Art Society, including work by Elizabeth Butterworth, Tony Cragg, Ian Davenport, Howard Hodgkin and Shirazeh Houshiary. His personal art collection included pieces by the sculptors Veronica Ryan and Magdalene Odundo.

== AIDS activism and death ==
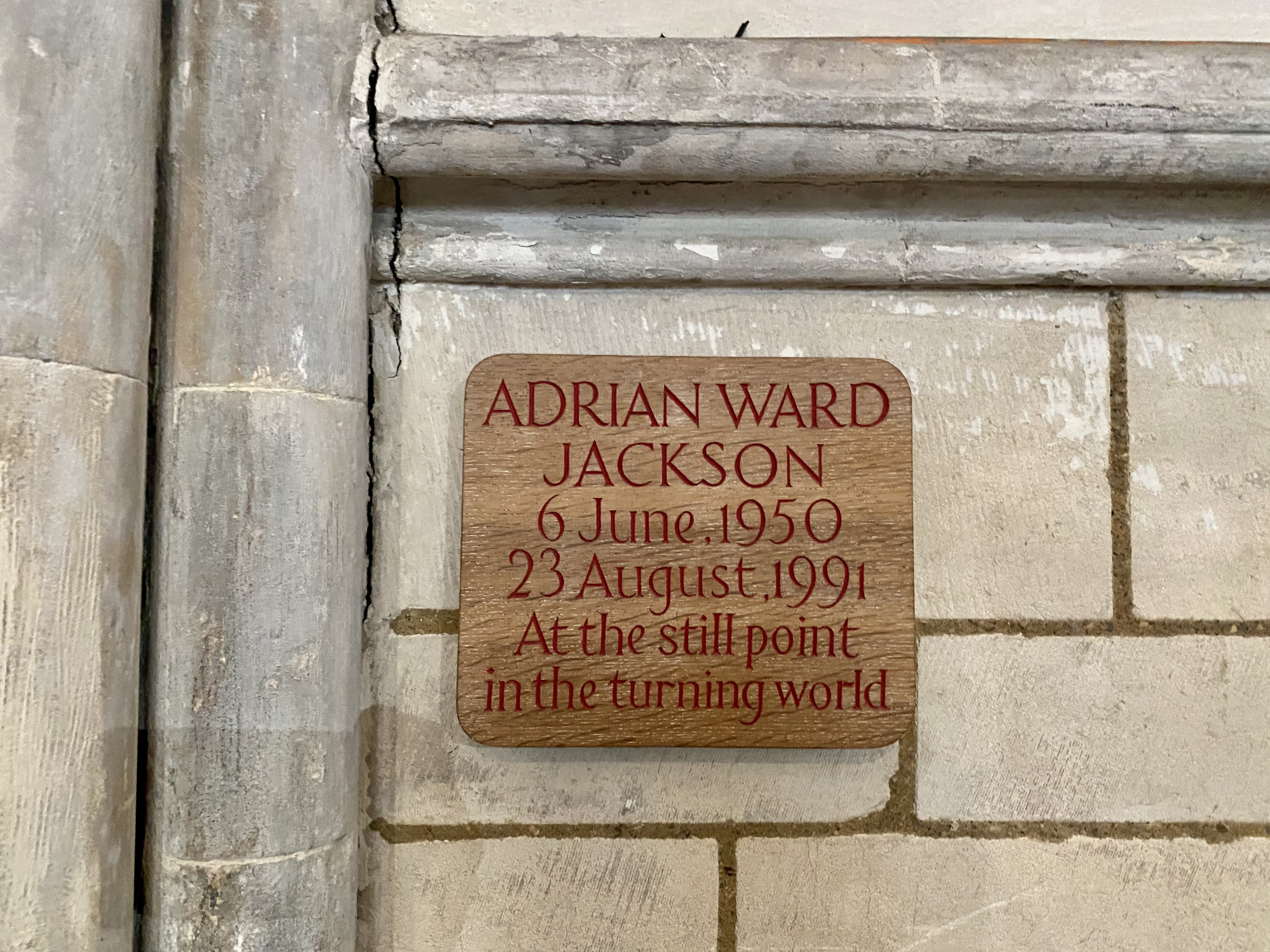
Memorial to Adrian Ward-Jackson in St Andrew's Chapel at Southwark Cathedral.

Ward-Jackson and the socialite Marguerite Littman started the AIDS Crisis Trust in 1986. Ward-Jackson donated a globe that had been dedicated to the naturalist Joseph Banks for a charity auction at Christie's in aid of the trust in June 1987. He also served as a patron of the London Lighthouse hospice for AIDS patients.

He died of AIDS at St Mary's Hospital in Paddington on 23 August 1991. Diana, Princess of Wales, had visited Ward-Jackson five times in the three days before his death and was with him for six hours the day before he died. She had been introduced to him by Angela Serota, the former ballet dancer and the wife of Nicholas Serota, director of the Tate. Diana was on holiday with the royal family at Balmoral Castle when she was informed that he was close to death—she drove through the night to be with him.

A memorial service for Ward-Jackson was held at St Paul's Church, Knightsbridge on 15 October 1991. It was attended by Diana and Princess Margaret. Lord Palumbo read from The Prophet by Kahlil Gibran and Tessa Blackstone, Baroness Blackstone read from T.S. Eliot's Burnt Norton. Only those people who visited him in hospital in his final months were permitted to attend. In her biography of Diana, Tina Brown described the funeral as being "populated with le tout London society like a scene from La Traviata" and that his sick bed had "for a time, become the place to be" as he received friends from London's high society while "reclining on an Oscar Wildean sofa amid Renaissance bronzes and French engravings".

The choreographer Richard Alston dedicated his piece Cat's Eye to Ward-Jackson. It was premiered by the Rambert Dance Company at the Bristol Old Vic in June 1992. Derek Jarman presented his 1993 painting Ataxia - Aids is Fun to the Tate Galleries in memory of Ward-Jackson.
