= Turf Club (gentlemen's club) =

Private social club in London (1861–)

The Turf Club
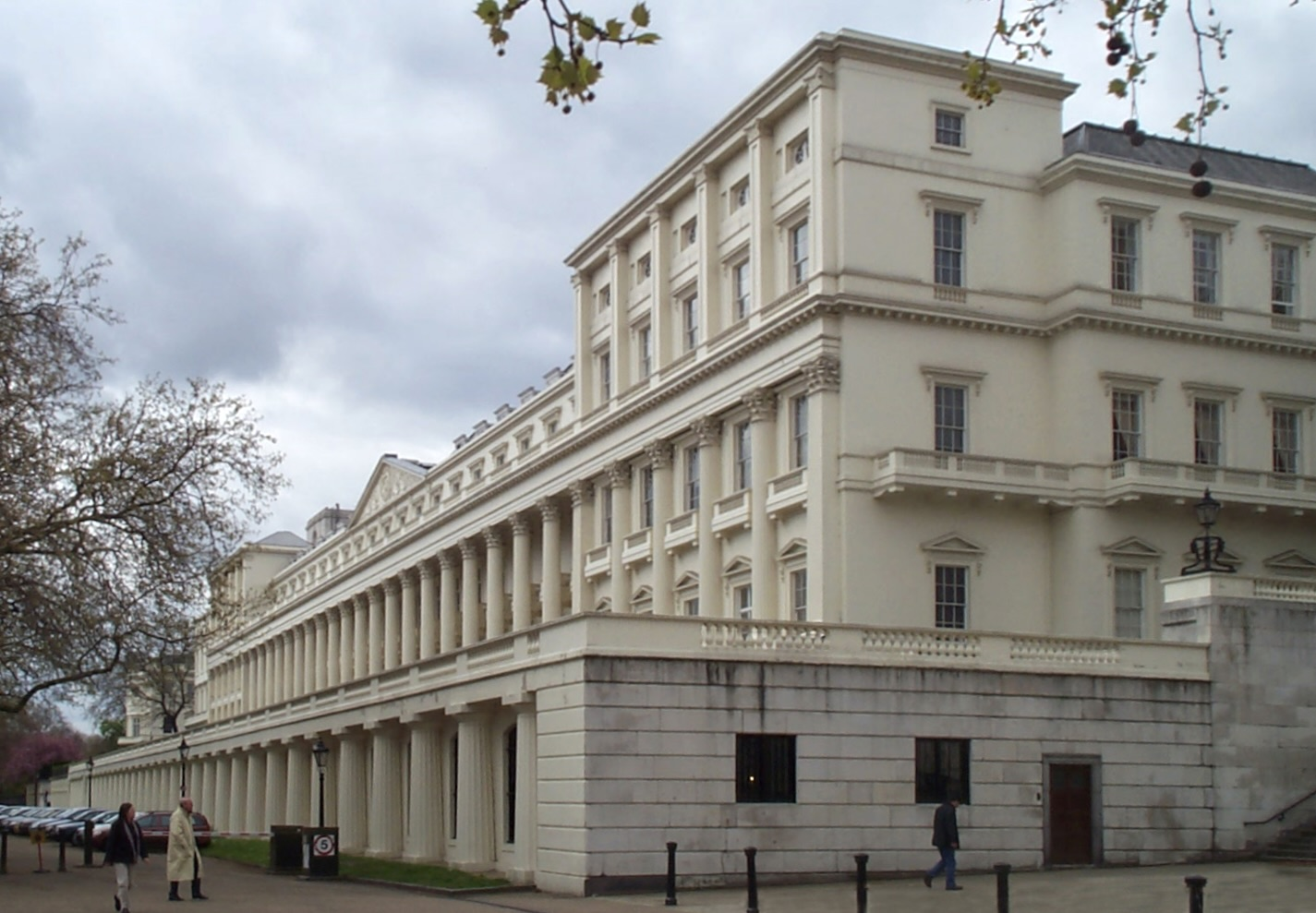
- Carlton House Terrace, from the Mall
- Formation: 1861; 165 years ago
- Type: Gentlemen's club
- Location: London, SW1
- Coordinates: 51°30′21″N 00°07′58″W

The Turf Club is a London gentlemen's club, established in 1861 as the Arlington Club. It has been located at 5, Carlton House Terrace since 1965.

== History ==
The Turf Club was founded in 1861 as the Arlington Club, with premises in Bennett Street, Piccadilly. It was while there that a committee of the Arlington, consisting of George Bentinck, Sir Rainald Knightley, Charles C. Greville, H. B. Mayne, John Bushe, G. Payne, and Colonel Pipon, under the chairmanship of John Clay MP, drew up the laws of whist, officially sanctioned by the Portland Club in 1864.

Members had originally wished to call themselves simply The Club until it was discovered that they had been beaten to it: a hundred years or so earlier the name had been claimed by Dr Johnson and Sir Joshua Reynolds for their renowned dining society.

The Turf Club moved in 1875 to the corner of Piccadilly and Clarges Street. The new building at 85 Piccadilly, designed by John Norton, remained the clubhouse for ninety years until the Club decided to sell the extremely valuable freehold.

In 1965, the Turf Club moved to its current home at 5 Carlton House Terrace, SW1Y 5AQ, overlooking the Mall. Carlton House Terrace itself was designed and built by John Nash, the successful Regency architect, between 1827 and 1833. The freehold of Number 5 belongs to the Crown Estate and the lease was held by the Earls of Caledon from 1830 until 1929, and its residents included Lord Palmerston; John Hay, the U.S. Ambassador; Emerald, Lady Cunard (mother of Nancy Cunard); and Harry Gordon Selfridge, founder of Selfridges.

== Notable members ==
The following is a list of notable present Turf Club members with year of birth in brackets.

- Adrian Ward-Jackson, CBE (1950)
- Thomas Fermor-Hesketh, 3rd Baron Hesketh, KBE, PC (1950)
- John Livingstone-Learmonth (1950)
- Anthony Fane, 16th Earl of Westmorland (1951)
- Hon. Peregrine Moncreiffe of that Ilk (1951)
- James Spencer-Churchill, 12th Duke of Marlborough (1955)
- Lt. Gen. Sir Barney White-Spunner, CBE (1957)
- Michael Bowes-Lyon, 18th Earl of Strathmore and Kinghorne (1957)
- Alastair Morrison, 3rd Baron Margadale (1958)
- Christopher Taylour, 7th Marquess of Headfort (1959)
- David Manners, 11th Duke of Rutland (1959)
- Hon. Rupert Soames, OBE (1959)
- Patrick Meade, 8th Earl of Clanwilliam (1960)
- Charles Hay, 16th Earl of Kinnoull (1962)
- Maurice Roche, 6th Baron Fermoy (1967)
- George Bingham, 8th Earl of Lucan (1967)
- Harry Lawson, 7th Baron Burnham (1968)
- Clifton Wrottesley, 6th Baron Wrottesley (1968)
- Andrew Balding (1972)
- Frederick Hervey, 8th Marquess of Bristol (1979)
- Sir Michael Palin

== See also ==
- List of London's gentlemen's clubs
