= Peter Shalson =

British businessman (born 1957)

- Born: February 1957 (age 69)
- Education: Hendon County School
- Occupation: Businessman
- Spouse: Polly Shalson (m. 2003)
- Children: 4 daughters

Peter Shalson (born February 1957) is a British businessman.

== Early life ==
Peter Shalson was born in February 1957. He was educated at Hendon County School, and left at 16.

== Career ==
Shalson made his first fortune in coat hangers and packaging materials.

In 2005 he owned 800 pubs, and had a net worth of £60 million.

== Personal life ==
Shalson has three daughters from his first marriage, and one from his second.

In 2003, he married for the third time, spending £5 million, hiring the Roundhouse in Camden for several weeks, and the musical entertainment was provided by Elton John (for £2 million) and Kool and the Gang.

Shalson lives in St John's Wood, London, and in 2011 received 200 hours' community service after he twice fired at a neighbour's burglar alarm with a shotgun, and then forced his way into the house and smashed it.

Shalson has been "hugely active" with the Presidents Club charity. He donated £1.5 million to the London Academy, a school in Edgware.
