= Anthony Yadgaroff =

British entrepreneur

Anthony H. Yadgaroff
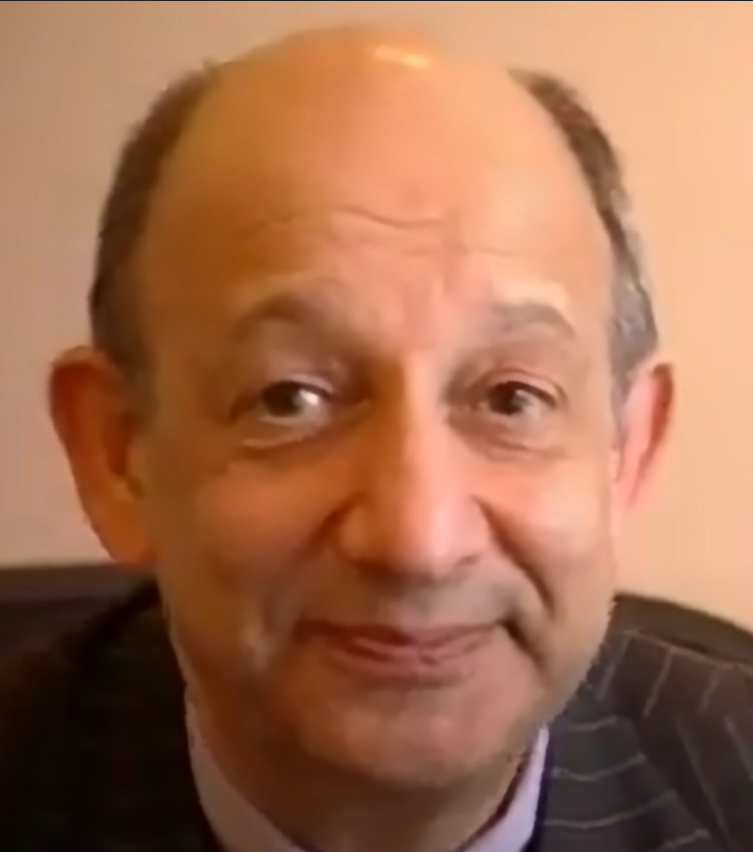
- Yadgaroff in 2010
- Born: 1949 (age 76–77)
- Occupations: Entrepreneur, community leader
- Spouse: Karen Yadgaroff
- Children: 2 daughters, Camilla, Pandora
- Relatives: Pierre Assouline

Anthony H. Yadgaroff (born 1949) is the founder of Allenbridge Group PLC, which is based in Old Jewry, London. Allenbridge was acquired by MJ Hudson, the asset management consultancy, and constitutes its investment advisory arm. Its CEO is Odi Lahav.

== Background ==
Anthony Yadgaroff is of Bukharian Jewish descent. His parents were both born in Bukhara, where his grandfather, Abraham H Yadgaroff, left in 1921. His father was Major Rahamin Yadgaroff who served in the British Army during World War II. His mother, Dora Yadgaroff, was the daughter of Aaron Abramoff, who spent the war years in Paris, where he was helped by Asaf Achildiev (listed previously). He has a brother Lewis Raphael Yadgaroff and two sisters: Odette Yadgaroff and Angela Assouline who is married to the well-known French author and broadcaster, Pierre Assouline.

== Career ==
In 2010 he won the award for the Best Hedge Fund Investment Advisory Firm at the European HFM Week. He has been short listed for Hedge Fund Consultant of the Year in Institutional Investor magazine's 8th Annual Hedge Fund Industry Awards, which recognize the institutional investors, hedge fund managers and consultants who stood out for their innovation, achievements and contributions to the alternatives industry in 2009. After some high-profile battles with large financial institutions who Yadgaroff successfully took on on behalf of investors, he gained the nickname "The Dragon Slayer".

== Jewish community ==
Yadgaroff is an integral member of the Jewish community in London. He served as Vice-President of Western Marble Arch Synagogue and is currently the treasurer of the Western Charitable Foundation, the largest Jewish burial society in the United Kingdom. Other positions Yadgaroff holds in the community include being a Director of the Simon Wiesenthal Center, an international Jewish human rights organisation, and a Governor of Tel Aviv University.

== Personal life ==
Anthony Yadgaroff lives in London with his wife Karen and has two daughters Camilla and Pandora. He is a passionate Spurs fan.
