= Mark Prince =

British boxer and charity founder (born 1969)

Mark Prince OBE
Personal information
- Born: 10 March 1969 (age 57) London, United Kingdom
- Weight: light-heavyweight

Boxing career

Mark Prince OBE (born 10 March 1969) is a British boxer and knife-crime charity founder.

== Life ==
Mark Prince was born on 10 March 1969 in London, United Kingdom.

Prince won the WBO intercontinental light-heavyweight title in September 1997.

In 2006, Prince's son, Kiyan, was killed in a stabbing incident. Following Kiyan's death, Prince founded the Kiyan Prince Foundation (KPF), a charity in memory of his son, with the aim to use boxing to deter people from getting involved in knife crime.

In 2016, Prince was awarded an honorary doctorate in Ministry by Excel University.

Price was honoured in the 2019 New Year Honours list with an OBE after his work with the KPF on tackling knife crime.

On 17 December 2024, Prince won the Helen Rollason Award at the BBC Sports Personality of the Year 2024 ceremony at MediaCity, Salford. He was given the honour as recognition for his work at the KPF.
