= Maison Novelli =

Restaurant in central London

- Location within London Borough of Islington

Restaurant information
- Established: 1996; 30 years ago
- Closed: January 24, 2003; 23 years ago
- Head chef: Richard Guest
- Chef: Jean-Christophe Novelli
- Food type: French cuisine
- Rating: Michelin star (1997)
- Location: 29 Clerkenwell Green, London, United Kingdom
- Coordinates: 51°31′22″N 0°6′23″W

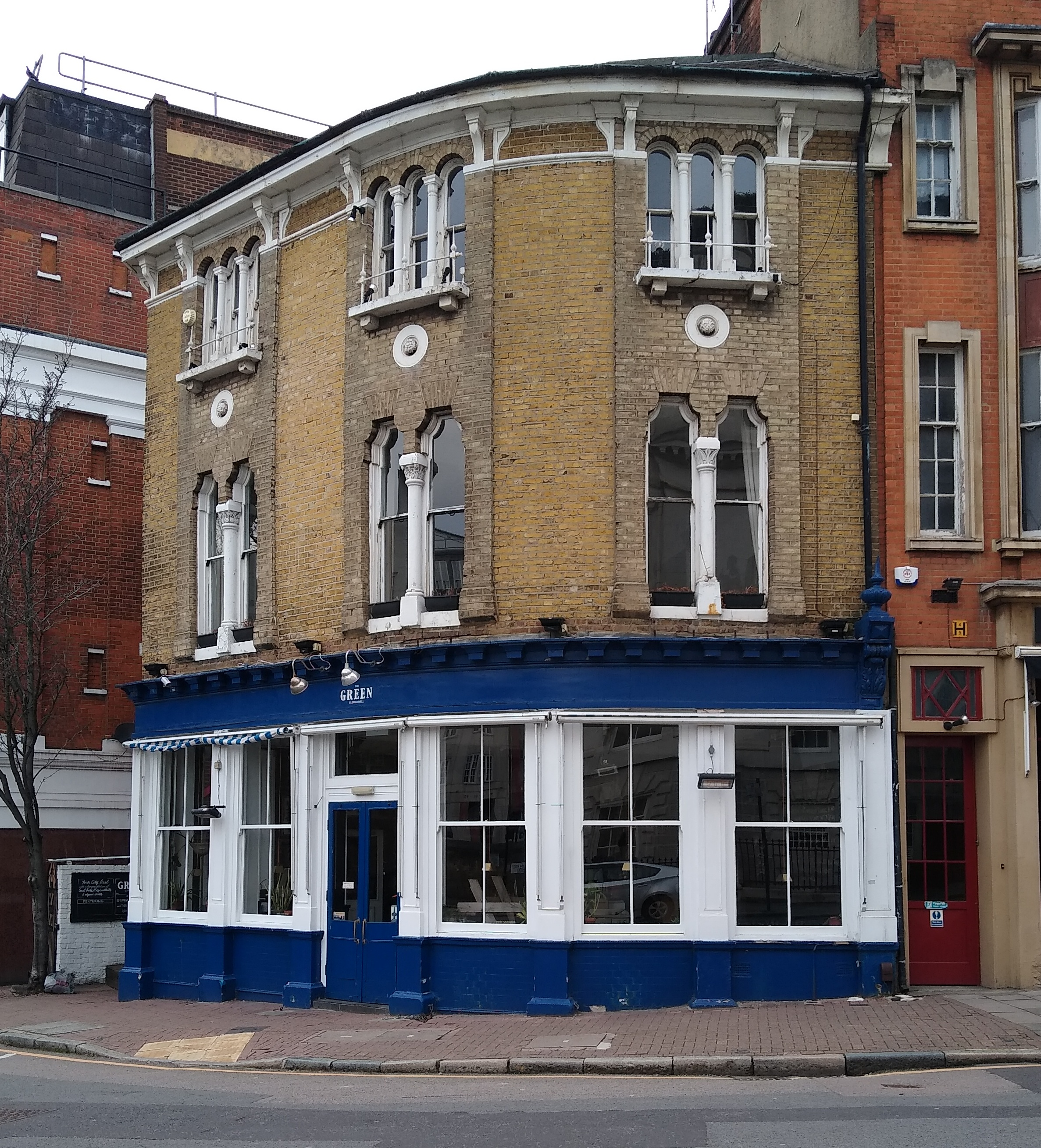
29 Clerkenwell Green, former location of Maison Novelli, pictured in 2021

Maison Novelli was a restaurant in Clerkenwell, Central London, located opposite the Old Session House. It was opened by chef proprietor Jean-Christophe Novelli, and held a single Michelin star in the 1997 Michelin Guide. The restaurant's holding company went into liquidation in 2000, and the restaurant was sold to JJ Restaurants with Novelli remaining on the staff as a consultant and advisor. Maison Novelli was closed in 2003.

== History ==
It was established by French celebrity chef Jean-Christophe Novelli in 1996, his first to be opened. He was chef proprietor, while Richard Guest was head chef, having worked under Novelli at the Four Seasons. The restaurant located at 29 Clerkenwell Green was formerly the Cafe St Pierre before its conversion into a high-end restaurant in the summer of 1996. The Cafe St Pierre location was sold to Novelli by Jimmy Lahoud, who had previously backed a number of restaurants, including those of Marco Pierre White. White was also one of the investors in the restaurant.

The restaurant was managed by Monsieur Irénée, who stated that he "wanted to create a friendly, informal atmosphere at Maison Novelli, while providing the very best levels of service." Irénée had previously worked at La Truffe Noire, another London restaurant. Eric Patton followed as restaurant manager at the end of 1997 and left in the summer of '98 to run Novellis bistro aptly named The Ark based in Notting Hill.

Maison Novelli was awarded a Michelin star in the 1997 guide. Chef Novelli left the restaurant as the resident head chef later that year to join Les Saveurs de Jean-Christophe Novelli, and Maison Novelli subsequently lost its Michelin star in the following year's guide. Following the closures of his other restaurants, Novelli returned to Maison Novelli in 1999 and announced that he would be concentrating on it, while Guest left the restaurant during the same year.

The restaurant's holding company, Maison Novelli Limited, went into voluntary liquidation on 30 June 2000. It had accumulated a debt of £200,000 against assets of £13,000. The business was sold by the liquidators to JJ Restaurants for just over £100,000, with the site reverting to the ownership of Jimmy Lahoud. The restaurant remained open following the liquidation. In 2002, Novelli left the London restaurant scene to become head chef at Auberge du Lac in Hertfordshire. He remained on the staff at Maison Novelli as an advisor and consultant. The restaurant closed in January 2003. Max Renzland looked to open his restaurant Chez Max on the site occupied by Maison Novelli later that year, but cancelled the plans and instead took over the location formerly used by City Rhodes, a Gary Rhodes restaurant. In July 2005, pitch black restaurant Dans le Noir? opened on Maison Novelli's site.

Notable guests at Maison Novelli have included Rod Stewart and Salman Rushdie. In 2006, Novelli kicked food critic Michael Winner out of his gastropub, the White Horse, in response to an incident at Maison Novelli where Winner reportedly upset several members of staff. Winner criticised the action and thought it was a set up by Novelli as a media team were ready to film him being removed.

== Reception ==
The AA criticised Novelli's initial business venture, saying in a 2000 review that "it looks as if it were created on a shoe-string (it was). But change is in the air, and Jean-Christophe Novelli was planning a revamp of the entire Clerkenwell premises as we went to press." However, The New Yorker stated "Jean-Christophe Novelli is one of the heroes of the Mod Brit movement, and his restaurant has drawn gastronomes from the day it opened. Head Chef Richard Guest gets the juices flowing."

The restaurant was nominated for Best New Restaurant at the Good Food Awards, but lost out to L'Oranger run by Marcus Wareing. The Independent said of Novelli and the restaurant, "even at lunchtime when people are hurrying to get back to their offices and most restaurants wouldn't expect even half of their customers to order a third course, Novelli has an astonishing 85 per cent take-up of sweets, easily putting him at the top of this particular league."
