= Apprenticeship Ambassadors Network =

British government sponsored employer group to promote apprenticeships in England

- Predecessor: Apprenticeship Task Force
- Formation: 2006; 20 years ago
- Founder: Sir Roy Gardner
- Type: Government supported employer-led association
- Legal status: Body
- Purpose: Promoting apprenticeships to employers and others and helping with their take up
- Location: London, United Kingdom
- Region served: England
- Services: Support and coordination
- Owner: Government of the United Kingdom
- Website: www.apprenticeships.gov.uk

The Apprenticeship Ambassadors Network is a British employer-led body sponsored by the Skills Funding Agency in England. Its remit is to encourage more employers to become involved in apprenticeships in England.

== History ==
The Network is the successor body to the Apprenticeship Task Force established by the Chancellor of the Exchequer. It was founded in 2006 under the chairmanship of Sir Roy Gardner (chairman, Compass Group plc).

David Meller, of the Meller Group, was chair from 2014 - 2018 followed by Jason Holt CBE of the Holts Group of Companies from 2018 to 2022. The previous chairman was Sir Roy Gardner, Chairman of Compass Group Plc. Members include ex-apprentice Mike Turner CBE Chairman of Babcock International and companies as diverse as Asda, British Gas, BT and Toyota.

The Network has presented Honorary Apprenticeship Awards to prominent people who have served an Apprenticeship and/or have had significant involvement in work based learning or achieved success via social enterprise or their profession. These Honoraries in turn then act as role models for young people and other employers.

In June 2007, at 11 Downing Street, Honorary Apprenticeships were awarded to Gary Rhodes OBE, Charles Worthington MBE, and Kamal Basran.

Recipients in 2009, at an event at 10 Downing Street, were Sir Alex Ferguson, CBE, Sir John Cassels CB, Mike Turner CBE, Alan Titchmarsh MBE, Brian Turner CBE, and Margaret Gildea OBE.

In 2011, recipient Sir Alan Jones, former chairman, Semta, received his award during the National Apprenticeship Service Awards in June. Boris Johnson, Mayor of London, Frances O'Grady, TUC Deputy General Secretary, Allan Cook CBE, Chairman Atkins Plc, and John Armitt, chairman, Olympic Development Authority also received Honorary Apprenticeship Awards for 2011 at a ceremony at Lancaster House on 14 December 2011.

On 10 July 2013, Ross Brawn OBE, Theo Fennell, Christine Gaskell MBE, Michel Roux Jr, Pete Waterman OBE and Baroness Wall of New Barnet received Honorary Apprenticeships, presented by Deputy Prime Minister Rt Hon Nick Clegg, at Admiralty House.

== See also ==
- National Apprenticeship Service
- Apprenticeships
