= Mount Street, London =

Street in London, England

Coordinates: 51.5097°N 0.1510°W

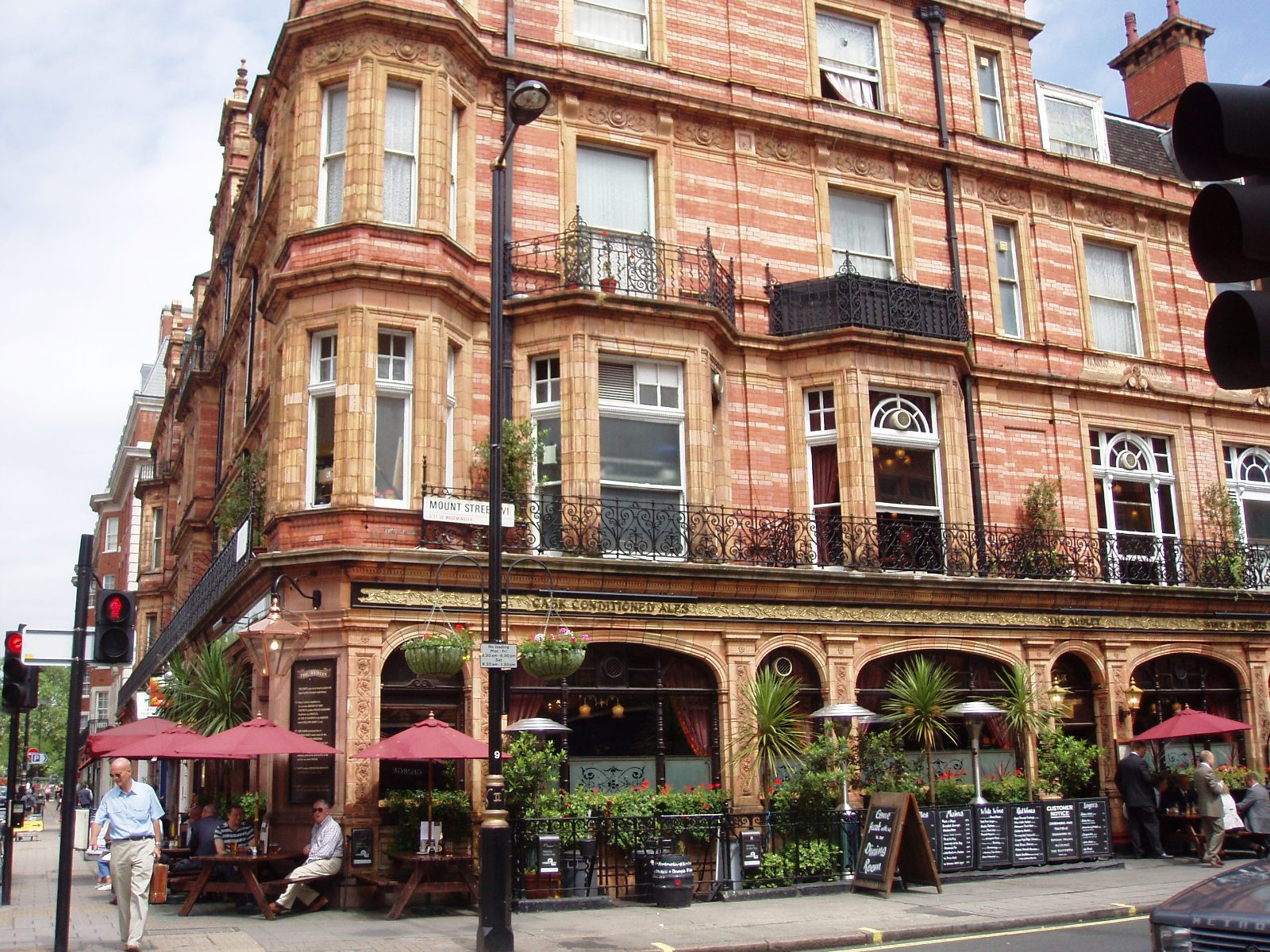
The Audley public house (pub-restaurant), co-fronts Mount Street.

Mount Street is an east–west street in Mayfair, London.

== Location ==
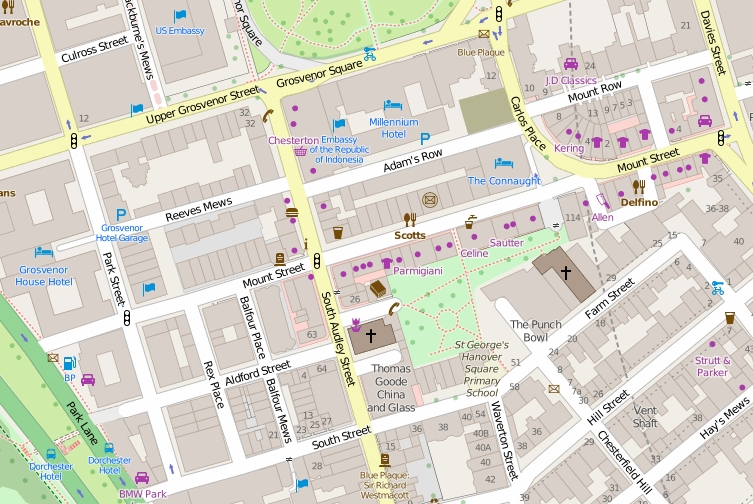
The immediate vicinity of Mount Street.

Mount Street runs from Park Lane in the west to Davies Street in the east. It is crossed by Park Street in the east and South Audley Street midway. On the south side Rex and Balfour Places branch off. In the east it leads to Berkeley Square and Carlos Place, Mount Street Mews and Carpenter Street branch off.

A area has been set aside to the south of the middle section, a canopy-covered public lawn with benches, Mount Street Gardens.

== Notable residents ==
- H. H. Asquith, politician.
- Jack Buchanan, at No. 44
- Fanny Burney, at No. 102
- David Carritt (1927–1982), art historian, dealer and critic, at No. 120
- Lady Mary Coke, at No. 34
- David Meller (born 1959), businessman, at No. 79
- Winston Churchill (1874–1965), statesman, at No. 105
- Rev. Dr. John Lockman, Canon of Windsor
- Adrian Ward-Jackson (1960–1991), art consultant and administrator, at No. 120.
- Frederic Morgan, 5th Baron Tredegar (1873–1954), Welsh peer and landowner who lived at No. 127.

== In popular culture ==
- W. E. Johns's creation 'Biggles' had a flat on Mount Street.
- In the "Raffles" stories written by E. W. Hornung, the character Bunny Manders has a flat in Mount Street.
- In Georgette Heyer’s 1949 publication 'Arabella' the wealthy Mr. Beaumaris lived on Mount Street. This book is set in the Regency era, 1817.

== Sources ==
- Jenkins, Roy (1964). Asquith (first ed.). London: Collins. OCLC 243906913.; online
