= London Academy =

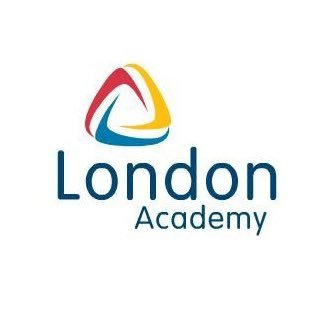

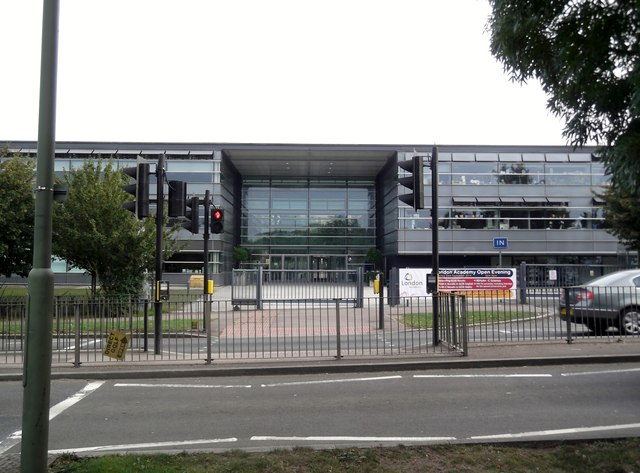
- Main entrance

Location
- Spur Road; Edgware, Greater London, HA8 8DE; England; 51°37′19″N 0°17′20″W

Information
- Type: Academy
- Motto: Leaders for Tomorrow
- Established: 1 September 2004; 21 years ago
- Department for Education URN: 134798 Tables
- Ofsted: Reports
- Principal: Alexander Warburton
- Gender: Mixed
- Age: 4 to 18
- Enrolment: 1,419
- Website: www.londonacademy.org.uk

London Academy (formerly Edgware School) is a mixed all-through school and sixth form for pupils ages 4 to 18. It is located in Edgware in the London Borough of Barnet, England.

== History ==
Formerly "Edgware School", it opened as the London Academy on 1 September 2004. The London Academy was one of 5 DfES Academies opened in 2004. Academies are all-ability schools established with sponsorship from business, faith or voluntary groups. The first 3 opened in 2002, and 9 more in 2003. Sponsorship of £1.5 million was provided by the chairman of a venture capital company, Peter Shalson. Money was also raised by resale of part of the old site.

On 18 May 2006, pupil Kiyan Prince was stabbed and killed outside of the school gates following an altercation with a fellow student.

The process of finalising a new school building with full occupancy was completed on schedule in September 2006. However, the toilets are regularly flooded and some of the facilities do not work.

The school experienced rapidly rising grades in the years after conversion to an academy: In 2005 the school achieved the best results ever with 49% A*-C grades at GCSE. In 2006 this rose to 56% and 78% in 2008.

In 2016, construction started for a new primary school on-site, which made it a 4-18 all-through school.

London Academy was graded as good in the latest Ofsted report published on 6 June 2018.

== Subjects ==
=== Key Stage 3 ===
- English
- Mathematics
- Science (Biology, Chemistry, Physics)
- Computer Science
- Design and Technology
- Religious Studies
- Geography
- History
- Art
- Music
- Drama
- Physical Education (PE)
- Languages (Spanish & French)

=== Key Stage 4 ===
- English
- Mathematics
- Science (Double or Triple)
- French or Spanish (exceptions for certain individuals)
- Religious Studies (exceptions for certain individuals)
- PE (compulsory for non GCSE exam students)
- PSCHE (Personal, Social, Citizenship & Health Education)
- Geography or History (Or Both if chosen)

GCSE Additional Subjects

- Computer Science
- Electronics
- Psychology
- Media Studies
- Drama
- Music
- Construction

== Notable former pupils ==
- Kiyan Prince (Professional footballer)
