= Western Marble Arch Synagogue =

Synagogue in London, United Kingdom

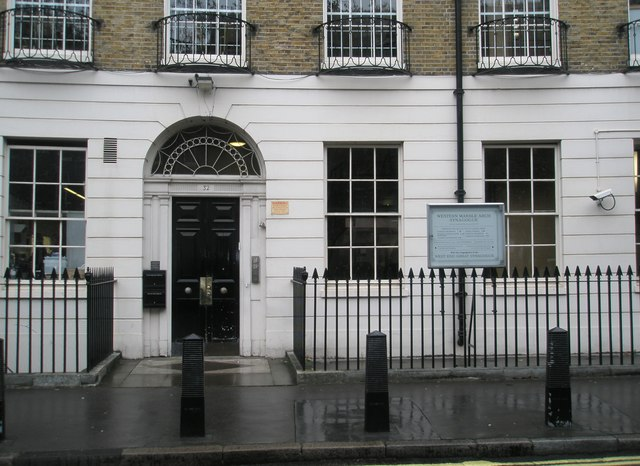
- Western Marble Arch Synagogue

- Location of the synagogue in Central London

Religion
- Affiliation: Orthodox Judaism
- Rite: Nusach Ashkenaz
- Ecclesiastical or organizational status: Synagogue
- Leadership: Rabbi Daniel Epstein; Rabbi Lionel Rosenfeld (Emeritus)
- Status: Active

Location
- Location: 1 Wallenberg Place, City of Westminster, Central London, England W1H 7TN
- Country: United Kingdom
- Interactive map of Western Marble Arch Synagogue
- Coordinates: 51°30′54″N 0°09′33″W

Architecture
- Established: 1991 (merged congregation): 1761 (Western); 1957 (Mable Arch)
- Completed: 1961

Website
- marblearch.org.uk

The Western Marble Arch Synagogue is an Orthodox Jewish congregation and synagogue, located at 1 Wallenberg Place, in the City of Westminster, in Central London, England, in the United Kingdom.

The congregation was formed in 1991 as the result of a merger between the Western and the Marble Arch Synagogues, with the former congregation dating from 1761. It is a leading Modern Orthodox congregation and offers religious and social activities to its members and the wider community. The congregation worships in the Ashkenazi rite.

== History ==
The Western Synagogue was founded in 1761 in Great Pulteney Street, Westminster. The congregation, formally named the Ḥevra Kadisha shel Gemilluth Ḥasadim (Hebrew: חברה קדישא של גמילות חסדים, lit. 'Holy Congregation of Acts of Charity') first met in the home of Wolf Liepman, a prosperous immigrant merchant from St. Petersburg. A series of leased spaces followed until 1826 when the congregation built an elaborate synagogue in St. Alban's Place, Haymarket and renamed itself The Western Synagogue.

The Western Synagogue and Marble Arch Synagogue, the latter founded in 1957, merged in 1991.

The building has been Grade II listed since 2024.

== Notable members ==
- Constance, Lady Battersea
- Barrington Black
- Lord David Gold
- Sir Samuel Montagu, Lord Swaythling
- Hannah Primrose, Countess of Rosebery
- Sir Gerald Ronson
- Sir Stuart Samuel
- Viscount David de Stern
- Anthony Yadgaroff

== See also ==
- History of the Jews in England
- List of Jewish communities in the United Kingdom
- List of synagogues in the United Kingdom
