= David Ritchie (surgeon) =

Scottish surgeon (1920–1993)

- Born: Horace David Ritchie; 24 September 1920; Falkirk, Scotland
- Died: 21 December 1993 (aged 73); Tenterden, Kent, England
- Education: University of Glasgow; Magdalene College, Cambridge; University of Edinburgh
- Occupation: Surgeon
- Known for: Professor of surgery, the Royal London Hospital
- Spouses: Jennifer Prentice; Elizabeth "Peggy" Thompson
- Children: 3 sons, including Bruce Ritchie

Horace David Ritchie FRCS FRCSE (24 September 1920 - 21 December 1993) was a Scottish surgeon and professor of surgery.

== Early life ==
David Ritchie was born on 24 September 1920 in Falkirk, Scotland, one of four children of a grocer in the town.

He had planned to become a Presbyterian minister, and earned a master's degree in Latin, Greek, and theology from the University of Glasgow, but then studied medicine at Magdalene College, University of Cambridge, and the University of Edinburgh, where he qualified in 1947.

== Career ==
In 1951, Ritchie passed the FRCS (Edinburgh), won the Crichton Research Scholarship and subsequently attempted to construct an artificial heart. In 1953, he received an MRC scholarship in Liverpool where he ultimately did perform a pig heart transplant. The pig survived for 30 days. In 1955, after lecturing in Dundee, he travelled to the Mayo clinic where he worked on surgical jaundice, for which he later won a gold medal. In 1958 he joined the Royal London Hospital as a senior lecturer. Along with John Blandy, who he persuaded to take up transplant surgery, Ritchie used Kolff's twin coil for dialysis, a procedure he was appointed to set up three years earlier. He was made reader in surgery in 1960 and on the retirement of Victor Dix in 1964 was appointed professor.

Ritchie pioneered the use of hyperbaric oxygen, which he used to save the frostbitten fingers of the climbers Chris Bonington and Dougal Haston, despite them managing to climb out of the tank and repair to a nearby pub.

In 1968, Ritchie supervised Richard Earlam who had moved to the London Hospital as a lecturer.

He was co-editor of Bailey and Love's Short Practice of Surgery for the editions of 1975 and 1981.

== Personal life ==
In 1953, he married Jennifer Prentice, and they had three sons, Gordon, Andrew and Bruce. That marriage ended in divorce in 1983, and in 1990, he married Elizabeth "Peggy" Thompson. He died in Tenterden, Kent, on 21 December 1993.
