= David Meller =

British businessman

David Meller CBE
- Born: David Robert Meller; December 1959 (age 66)
- Occupation: Businessman
- Known for: Co-chairman, Presidents Club

David Robert Meller CBE (born December 1959) is a British businessman, and the sponsor of an academy trust, and a member of the Department for Education's board of directors, until the scandal surrounding the Presidents Club, of which he was the joint chairman, led to his resignation in January 2018.

== Early life ==
David Robert Meller was born in December 1959. He is the son of Percival Meller (1919–2016), and his wife Anita. He has a brother, Michael Meller.

Meller has said that he attended a comprehensive school, earned four O-levels and "struggled with dyslexia".

== Career ==
In 1987, Meller was the joint chief executive of Julius A. Meller Ltd of London, a "diversified manufacturing company", from which his father had retired. The company was founded by his grandfather, Julius Aaron Meller.

In 2013 he was chairman of the Meller Group, a cosmetics firm. As of 2018 Meller was helping to "run his family's company", described as "a luxury goods company."

Meller founded the Meller Educational Trust, which runs four schools and a university technical college.

In June 2013, Meller joined the Department for Education as a non-executive board member. He also served as chair of the Apprenticeship Ambassadors Network and co-chair of the Apprenticeship Delivery Board from January 2016.

In 2009 he set up the Meller Educational Trust. The trust runs four schools and a university technical college, and served as chair of the National Apprenticeship Ambassador Network and the Apprenticeship Delivery Board. In 2013, he was the "main backer" of a new school opening that autumn in Elstree.

In January 2018 a scandal arose surrounding the Presidents Club, of which Meller was the joint chairman. Following calls by MPs and others, he resigned from the Department for Education's board of directors, and the apprenticeship delivery board, the day after the story broke in the Financial Times. Meller also resigned as a trustee of the Mayor's Fund for London.

== Honours ==
Meller received a CBE in the 2018 New Year's honours list.

== Politics ==
Meller has been a "generous Conservative party donor".

Meller was a trustee of the think tank Policy Exchange, founded by Michael Gove, and finance chair of Gove's 2016 Conservative leadership campaign.

== PPE Contracts ==
During the COVID pandemic, Meller's company, Meller Designs, was awarded six PPE contracts worth £164m through the VIP lane.

== Personal life ==
On 24 October 1987, Meller married Wendy Susan Frumkes, the daughter of Herbert M. Frumkes of New York, president of Tradex Brokerage Service Inc, at New York's Metropolitan Club.

In May 2015, Meller sold a 10,000-square-foot (930 m^{2}), six-storey Grade II listed Arts and Crafts-style brick house at 79 Mount Street, Mayfair, London to the Qatari Royal Family for £40 million.
