= Kiyan Prince =

English footballer (1990–2006)

- Born: 25 November 1990
- Died: 18 May 2006 (aged 15); Edgware, London, England
- Cause of death: Stabbing
- Education: London Academy

Kiyan Josiah Prince (/ˈkaɪæn/ "KYE-ann"; 25 November 1990 – 18 May 2006) was an English footballer who played for the Queens Park Rangers youth academy. Described as "a prodigious footballing talent" and "an outstanding and upstanding boy", Prince was fatally stabbed outside his school (London Academy in Edgware, London) on 18 May 2006, while trying to stop the bullying of another boy.

== Murder ==
On 18 May 2006, Prince was involved in an altercation with 16-year-old fellow London Academy pupil Hannad Hasan outside the school gates. Hasan managed to get Prince in a headlock before stabbing him once in the heart with a penknife. A Metropolitan Police Sergeant from the local Edgware Safer Neighbourhood team found Prince; he was transferred by air to the Royal London Hospital in Whitechapel where he was pronounced dead two hours later. Two days later Hasan was charged with Prince's murder.

=== Trial ===
On 2 July 2007, following a trial at the Old Bailey, during which Hasan denied murdering Prince but admitted manslaughter, he was convicted of murder and sentenced to life imprisonment with a minimum of 13 years to be served. Hasan claimed he carried the penknife "like a toy". It was not revealed to the jury that a few days prior to Prince's stabbing, Hasan had used the knife to threaten a schoolgirl on a bus during an argument.

The then-Mayor of London, Ken Livingstone, in response to the killing, said that he would encourage the Home Secretary and the Lord Chancellor to impose maximum imprisonment sentences for those who carry knives. In addition to this, the Violent Crime Reduction Act 2006 was enacted that increased the age at which a person can purchase a knife from 16 to 18.

== Aspiring footballer ==
Prince playing for Queens Park Rangers's youth team

Prince, who signed for Queens Park Rangers's youth team in 2004 has been described as a prodigious talent; he was due to collect a players' award shortly after his death. QPR's first team coach at the time, Gary Waddock, paid tribute to Prince saying: "The whole club is mourning the loss of one of our own. We are all devastated. Kiyan was certainly one for the future, a very talented lad who wanted to forge a career in football." The club later revealed they planned to sign him as a professional. In memory of Prince, QPR established an annual award called the "Kiyan Prince Goal of the Season", which is awarded to the player who scores QPR's best goal of each season.

Since June 2019, following a fan vote, QPR's ground at Loftus Road was renamed the Kiyan Prince Foundation Stadium in memory of Prince and the anti-knife crime charity established by his father. On 25 November 2020, the date that would have marked his 30th birthday, the club encouraged all supporters to wear something blue and something white in memory of Prince.

On 18 May 2021, on the 15th anniversary of his death, EA Sports added him to FIFA 21 as a tribute. QPR also stated he would also be included in their squad list for the 2021–2022 season.

== Foundation ==
In response to Prince's death, his father, former boxer (and ex-International IBF and WBO Champion) Mark Prince, founded the Kiyan Prince Foundation (KPF) in early 2007. The not-for-profit organization is committed to using Kiyan's legacy to combat knife crime and other forms of youth violence. Its mission is to:

"work with young people to increase awareness and address the consequences of gun and knife crime through education. It aims to empower young people by promoting a sense of belonging, self-worth and purpose that can be found outside of gang culture and offending behaviour through providing access to diversionary and preventative activities".

Mark Prince was made an OBE in the 2019 New Year Honours for "services to tackling knife and gang crime in London".
