= Park Street, Mayfair =

Street in Mayfair, London

Coordinates: 51°30′40.23″N 0°9′17.08″W

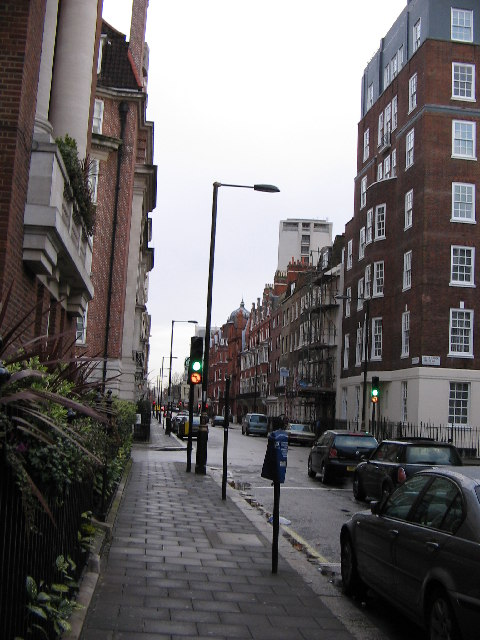
Park Street in 2005

Park Street is a street in Mayfair, London, England. It is the longest street on the Grosvenor Estate.

It is a one-way street running south to north from a t-junction with South Street to a crossroads with Oxford Street, where it continues north as Portman Street.

It was formerly known as Hyde Park Street. House building on the street began in the late 1720s, and was completed in the late 1770s, and the only surviving original properties are nos 70 to 78.

== Notable residents ==
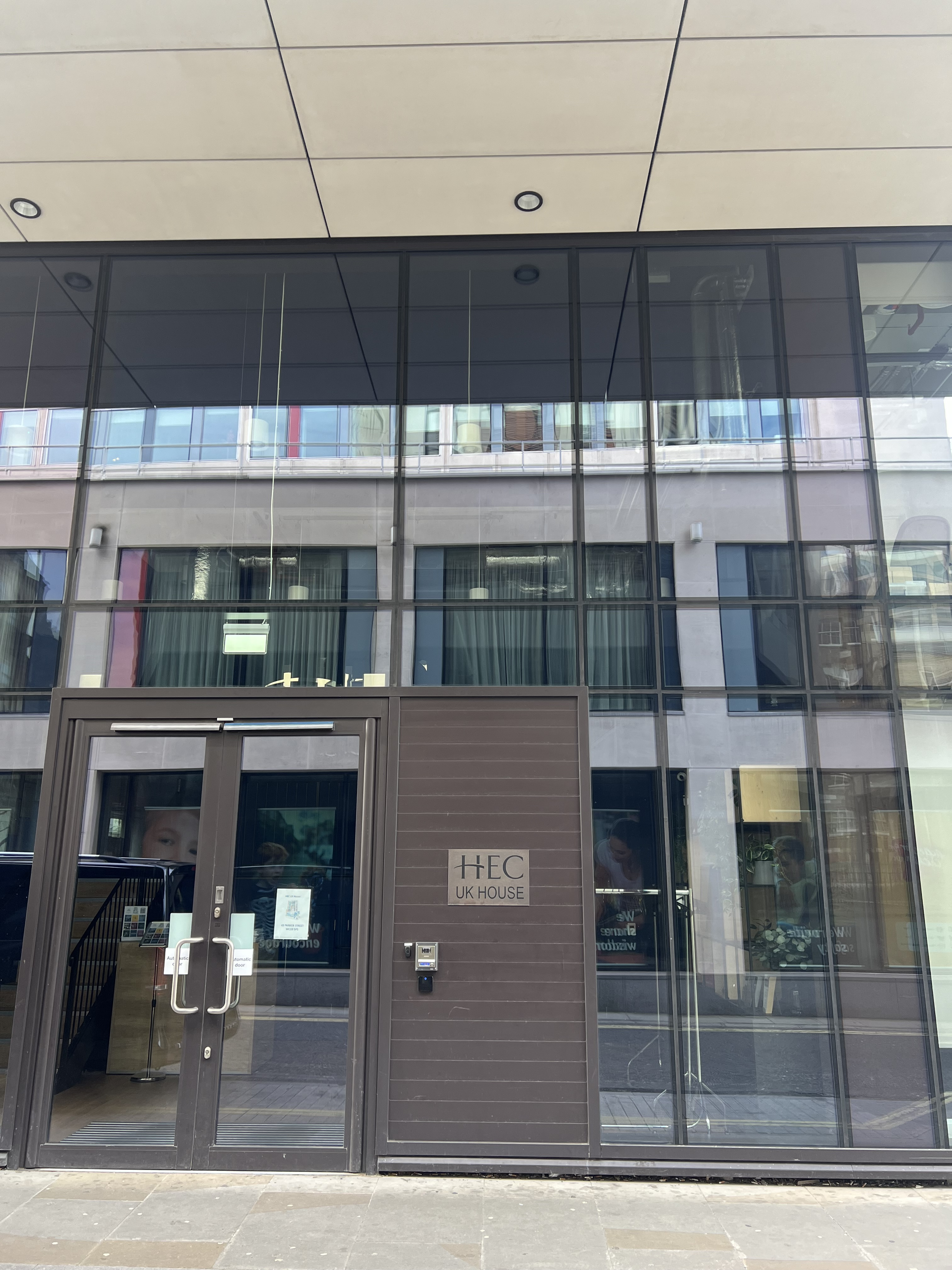
HEC UK House entrance

- 43 HEC UK House
- 58 Sir Rufane Donkin, from 1827
- 64 Richard Teage, from 1729
  - Stanley Cousins, 1926-28
  - John Dewar, 2nd Baron Forteviot, 1928-36
- 91 Kenneth Mackay, 2nd Earl of Inchcape, 1936–39
- 93 Sir Louis Baron, 1st Baronet, 1931–34
- 101 Robin Vane-Tempest-Stewart, 8th Marquess of Londonderry, 1934–41
- 103 Robert Vansittart, 1st Baron Vansittart, diplomat, 1925–31
- 103A Alan Burns, 4th Baron Inverclyde, 1930–33
- 108 Albertha Spencer-Churchill, Duchess of Marlborough, ex-wife of George Spencer-Churchill, 8th Duke of Marlborough, 1903–32
- 110 Thomas Cundy III and his son, Thomas Elger Cundy, 1889–92
- 114 Dowager Lady Vernon, widow of 6th Baron Vernon, 1892–98
- 115: James Hamilton, 3rd Duke of Abercorn (1894–1922); Mary, Dowager Duchess of Abercorn (died 1929); Sir Patrick Hastings (until 1952)
- unknown: James Lind
- unknown: Jean-André Deluc
