= Jimmy Lahoud =

Lebanese businessman and restaurateur

- Born: June 1949 (age 77); Lebanon
- Occupations: Businessperson, restaurateur
- Years active: 1970s–2000s
- Known for: Ownership of Quo Vadis, L'Escargot; association with Marco Pierre White

Jimmy Lahoud (born June 1949) is a Lebanese businessman and restaurateur in London, England. He has owned restaurants such as Quo Vadis, L'Escargot, and Café St. Pierre (which became Maison Novelli). Lahoud is credited for launching the career of celebrity chef Marco Pierre White. With White, Lahoud established the company White Star Line Ltd, which owned restaurants L'Escargot, the Belvedere, Criterion, The Mirabelle, Drones and Quo Vadis. In 2007, The Mirabelle, Drones and Quo Vadis were sold to Conduit Street Restaurants, owned by Stephen Schaffer and Joseph Ettedgui.. Lahoud is also an art collector, and artworks by artists including Pablo Picasso, Joan Miró, Marc Chagall, Andy Warhol and Henri Matisse have been displayed in at least one of his restaurants.

== Career ==
Lahoud developed his restaurant business in London during the 1970s and 1980s, becoming associated with a number of establishments in Soho and central London. By the 1990s, he was involved in the ownership and operation of several well-known restaurants, including L'Escargot and Quo Vadis. In 1999, he formed White Star Line Ltd with Marco Pierre White, through which a group of restaurants were brought under shared ownership and management. The company's portfolio included L'Escargot, the Belvedere, Criterion, The Mirabelle, Drones and Quo Vadis, and in 2007 part of this portfolio was sold to Conduit Street Restaurants, backed by Stephen Schaffer and Joseph Ettedgui.
