= James Lind (disambiguation) =

James Lind (1716–1794) was a Scottish physician.

James or Jim Lind may also refer to:

- James Lind (naturalist) (1736–1812), natural philosopher, Scottish physician, Frankenstein inspiration, cousin of James Lind (1716–1794)
- James Lind (Royal Navy officer) (1765–1823), captain in the Royal Navy, son of James Lind (1716–1794)
- James F. Lind (1900–1975), American politician
- Jim Lind (politician) (1913–1980), Canadian Member of Parliament
- Jim Lind (American football) (born 1947), American football coach
- J. D. Lind (James Douglas Lind, born 1985), Canadian curler
