= James Lind (naturalist) =

Scottish philosopher and physician (1736–1812)

James Lind FRSE FRCPE
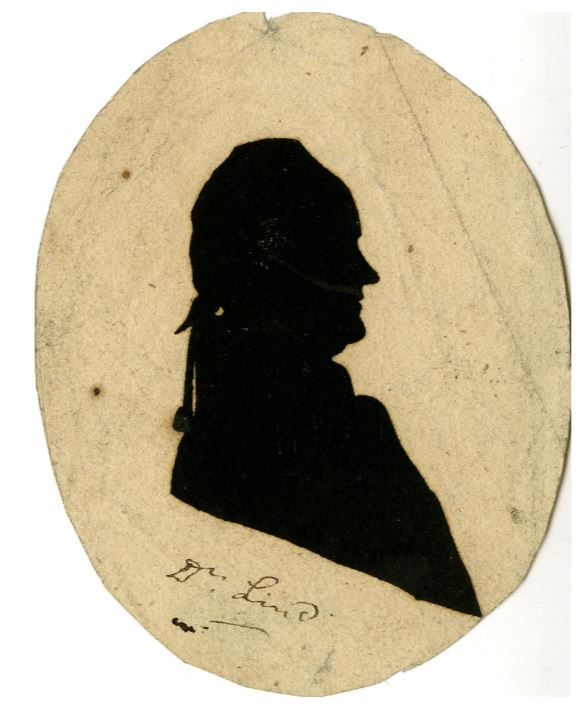
- Born: 17 May 1736; Gorgie, Edinburgh, Scotland
- Died: 17 October 1812 (aged 76); Russell Square, London, England
- Education: Edinburgh University (MD 1768)
- Relatives: James Lind
- Medical career
- Profession: Natural philosopher Physician
- Institutions: Surgeon, East India Company; Fellow of the College of Physicians

James Lind FRS FRSE FRCPE (May 17, 1736 – October 17, 1812) was a Scottish natural philosopher and physician.

== Life ==
James Lind was born in Gorgie, Edinburgh on 17 May 1736.

=== Family ===
James Lind was the son of Alexander Lind of Gorgie, FRSE, (who was the son of George Lind of Gorgie, Sheriff Deputy of Edinburgh, and Jean Montgomery of Smithton) Lind's great-grandfather was John Lind IV (who was the son of Mary Boyd of Pittfinde). John Lind IV and Isabel had five children. Their other notable descendants included James Keir, and George Lind (who was Lord Provost of Edinburgh, and Member of Parliament for Edinburgh), and Colonel John Lind, and Major-General John Lind (1733 - 1795), and Anne Lind (who was the wife of Richard Cooper), and the distinguished physician James Lind of Haslar (1716 – 1794) (who is the namesake of the James Lind Alliance), and Sir James Lind, and John Lind (barrister), and Sir James Grant.

The surname Lind, of which the motto was Semper Virescit Virtus, is derived from Lynne of Ayrshire in Scotland. Synonymous variations include Lynne, Linn and Lind used by free Barons from the earliest of recorded history. There were Linns of that Ilk in Ayrshire, and Linns of Pitmade in Perthshire. James Lind is descended from the Linds of Ayrshire. King John Balliol mentions William de Lynne of that Ilk in a donation, who is a direct forefather in the Lind lineage. Lind's mother, Helen Allardice (1697 - 1746) was daughter of Sir George Allardice, Member of Parliament and Master of the Mint of Scotland, through whom James Lind was 10th in descent from James II of Scotland.

Lind married Ann Elizabeth Mealy on 07 Nov 1778. She is mentioned in Burney's Diary, she mentioned his wife as "a fat handsome wife who is as tall as himself and about six times as big". Charlotte Papendiek referred to her as "needlewoman and everything to the Duchess of Portland at Bulstrode". Mealy was daughter of John Mealy of Middlesex and Elizabeth Parry of Perveddgoed. whose pedigree included lineage from David Daron who was the Dean of Bangor in 1399. Ann died at the age of 48 from an apoplectic fit. Lind had at least four children by Ann Elizabeth Mealy: Their notable children included: Lucy Maria Lind (1783-1858, later Sherwill after marrying Guard Officer and mountaineer Markham Eeles Sherwill) who profiled Princess Amelia of the United Kingdom; Dorothea Sophia Banks Lind (1786 - 1863), who married Isaac Gosset (1782 – 1855), and whose daughter Helen Dorothea or Dorothy Gosset married William Driscoll Gosset; Alexander Francis Lind (1797 - 1832), who was a civil servant for Lord Ailesbury and for Queen Charlotte, and who was Judge of Mirzapur, and who married Anna Maria Macan (1802 - 1862) who was the daughter of Robert Macan High Sheriff of Armagh in 1814.

=== Personality ===
Lind is widely regarded as having an eccentric personality, and considered to be reckless with spending money as captured by the following dialogue: "Why, Dr. Lind, you spend a whole seas of gold", to which Lind replied, "Madam, 'tis true, my very name, behold, Begins with pounds and ends, alas, with pence"

Charles Burney described Lind as extremely thin, tall, with grey hair as seen around age 70 ('a mere lath'). Lind was generally acknowledged to have a sweet disposition, and Fanny Burney cast doubt whether he obtained much of a private medical practice: "his taste for trickes, conundrums and queer things makes people fearful of his trying experiments on their constitutions, and think of him a better conjuror than a physician; though I don't know why the same man should not be both".

Percy Shelley said Lind to be, "...exactly what an old man ought to be. Free, calm-spirited, full of benevolence, and even of youthful ardor: his eye seemed to burn with supernatural spirit beneath his brow, shaded by his venerable white locks, he was tall, vigorous, and healthy in his body; tempered, as it had ever been, by his amiable mind. I owe to that man far, ah! far more than I owe to my father: he loved me, and I shall never forget our long talks, where he breathed the spirit of the kindest tolerance and the purest wisdom,"

In A Sketch of My Life, Lind's son Alexander Frances Lind wrote: "Would that my feeble pen could render better justice to my father's memory; and would that I had been older to have profited by the instructions he was so peculiarly fitted to afford. I have been told, and I believe it, that few men existed of more universal knowledge; and that very few could be met, whose conversation was do instructive, and whose life and manners were more gently, and unassuming."

=== Social memberships ===
==== Freemasonry ====
Lind was involved in freemasonry in Scotland. He was initiated in the Canongate Kilwinning, Lodge No. 2, on 2 August 1758. He was also active in the Grand Lodge of Scotland, of which he was Senior Grand Warden between 1769 – 1771.

==== Intellectual societies ====
- Fellow of the College of Physicians, Edinburgh, admitted 6 November 1770
- Founding Fellow of the Royal Society of Edinburgh, formerly known as the Philosophical Society of Edinburgh, on 03 November 1783.
- Edinburgh Musical Society, member from 12 December 1771 to 27 June 1772, and 21 June 1773 until 2 December 1776.
- The Royal Society of London on 18 December 1777.

Lind was also a corresponding member of the Lunar Society.

In 1773 he was a founding member of the Aesculapian Club.

== Death ==
Late in life, a portrait of Lind was painted by John Keenan in 1807. Keenan was the portrait painter to Queen Charlotte in 1809.

Lind died at the house of his son-in-law, William Burnie, in Russell Square, London, on 17 October 1812. Alexander Francis Lind indicated the cause of death was, "of a suppression of urine, which for nearly five years before his death kept him in ceaseless agony". He is buried in at St George's Church on Bloomsbury Way, London in the crypt, coffin 6084.

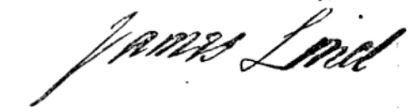
James Lind's signature

== Career ==
In addition to medicine, Lind was interested in a variety of sciences (botany, astronomy, meteorology, geology, chemistry, mathematics, etc.), collected antiques and drawings, and was a silhouette artist and played the bassoon and flute.

As a member of the Society, Lind was closely acquainted with many prominent scientists of his era exemplified by James Watt. Watt confided in Lind in discussing his steam engine, and in Watt's publication, Description of a New Perspective Machine, he opens by referring to Lind: "The perspective machine was invented about 1765, in consequence of my friend Dr. James Lind having brought from India a machine [...] invented by Mr. Hurst."

In A Sketch of My Life, Lind's son, Alexander Francis Lind, described Lind's laboratory as, "resembling a wizard’s or alchemist’s laboratory, crammed with telescopes, galvanic batteries, electrical machines, chemical apparatus, and even antique daggers"

=== Career highlights ===
==== Education ====
Dr. James Lind (1736-1812) Dissertation: De Febre Remittente Putrida Paludum quæ grassabatur in Bengalia (On the Putrid Remittent Marsh Fever Which Raged in Bengal)

Lind studied medicine at Edinburgh University under William Cullen and Joseph Black. In 1766, he then joined the East India Company as surgeon. In 1768 he received his doctorate (MD) from Edinburgh upon completing a dissertation on marsh fever (malaria), De Febre Remittente Putrida Paludum quæ grassabatur in Bengalia - by Jacobus Lind (On the Putrid Remittent Marsh Fever Which Raged in Bengal - by James Lind). The university Principal, Gulielmi Robertson S.S.T.P. (Sacrosanctae Theologiae Professor), is listed on the dissertation title page as the authority for granting the degree.

Lind was regarded as the young protege of David Hume and the Edinburgh intellectual circle. Hume encouraged Benjamin Franklin to meet with Lind in 1772.

In 1774, Lind applied to professorship at Edinburgh competing against Andrew Duncan, William Buchan, Daniel Rutherford and others, but Lind was not selected for the position.

==== Naval voyages ====
As a naturalist, Lind collected plant specimens during voyages aboard East Indiaman Drake (1762-1763) and Hampshire (1765-1767) with significant collections made at the Cape and the Comoros en route to India and south-east Asia. Lind visited:

- Canton, China in 1766, bringing back a specimen of lemon grass that was sampled in tea; in 1789 Lind would visit Joseph Banks at Soho Square to draft a remarkable manuscript that cross-referenced, in tabular form, Chinese plants from Chinese and Latin texts in Banks' library (Lind spoke Chinese in addition to his knowledge of Latin, used for his dissertation), thus enabling botanists to place accurate orders of exotic flora. Lind also contributed to Fanny Burney's efforts to develop a chapter on Chinese music in the fifth volume of the History of Music. Furthermore, Lind prepared a book representing every part of a Chinese monastery including buildings, utensils, Gods, priests, and idols in vivid detail, as well as a Chinese dictionary. Lind's witty sarcasm is showcased as he told Pieter Camper "the Chinese do not wish to bring up their children, but drown them in the river". Lind was later requested to join the Macartney Embassy in China in 1792 but Lind declined. David Lord Cardross directed Thomas Birch to assist Lind with the China expedition on 3 Dec 1765.
- Iceland in 1772 with Joseph Banks, Uno von Troil and Daniel Solander where they were among the first to reach the summit of Hekla volcano, and Lind measured the height of Geysir in Haukadalur with a quadrant.
- South Africa in 1779. Spent three months at Cape of Good Hope en route to India, collected plants around False Bay which are now at the British Museum.

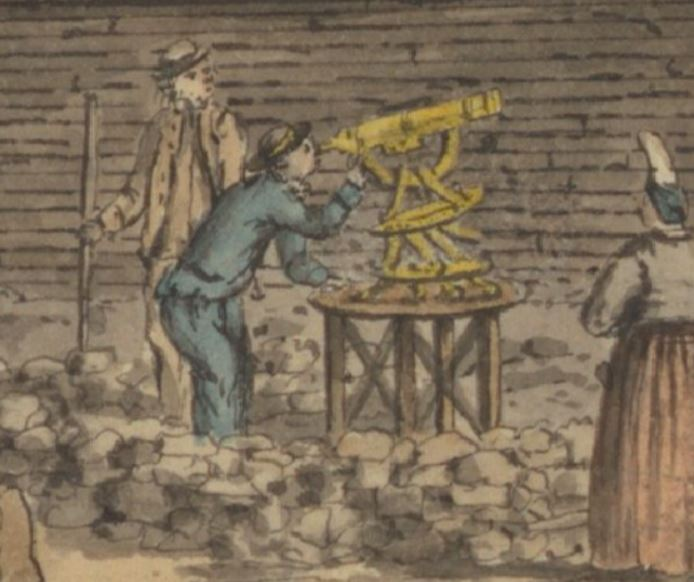
James Lind in Iceland making an observation with an equatorial made by Ramsden

The Icelandic expedition of 1772 took place after initial unsuccessful plans for both Banks and Lind to sail with James Cook on his second voyage as mentioned in A Voyage Round the World; Lind was to be hired as astronomer and to receive £4000 for the voyage. Consistent with the misidentification of the James Lind cousins, some sources credit the cousin James Lind (1716-1794) as the astronomer candidate for Cook's second voyage, however there is no doubt regarding the identity of James Lind (1736-1812) as noted in his son's memoirs A Sketch of My Life, and supported with the following excerpts from the Society minutes:

Dr James Lind is recommended to the Board of Longitude ‘as a person who will be extremely useful in the intended voyage for discoveries in remote parts; on account of his skill and experience in his profession, and from his great Knowledge in Mineralogy, Chemistry, Mechanics, and various branches of Natural Philosophy; and also from his having spent several years in different climates, in the Indies'.-R.S.,
It was not really Cook but Joseph Banks who wanted Lind as part of his large entourage, and after Banks had failed to get his will with regards to the expedition ships of Cook's second voyage and decided not to go, they went to Iceland, the Hebrides and the Orkney Islands together instead in 1772.

Lind is likewise credited with being the first to determine the latitude of Islay. He created a map of the island which was accepted by the geographical authority of the era; Lind gave the map to Thomas Pennant. In reference to intellectual curiosity and government funding opportunities, Lind said, " [...] I am turned Longitude mad and I have go a most novel Sextant made by my friend Ramsden, which altho only Six inches Radius it is divided to half seconds. A magnifier magnifies the nonius and Telescope magnifies the Observation."

Lind is mentioned in the Bengal Consultations, official minutes of the Council of Fort William (Calcutta Council), in a report from 15 Nov 1762 when Assistant Surgeon Peter Smith faced an examination board for promotion to surgeon which included Lind, Clement Crooke, Christopher King (Surgeon of the Hardwicke).

==== Inventions ====
Anemometer designed by James Lind (1736-1812)

Lind's Anemometer

Anemometer designed by Dr. James Lind of Windsor

Lind invented the Lind Type Tube Anemometer (portable wind gauge) in 1775, a prototype of which he had sent to Sir John Pringle. Lind's invention became the foundational base design for future anemometers such as William Snow Harris's in 1858.

Lind also designed a rain gauge as well as a barometer which he took to the summit of Arthur's Seat in collaboration with William Roy.

Illustration of Lind's Quadrant appearing in A Synopsis of Practical Mathematics by Alexander Ewing

Lind's Quadrant

Furthermore, Lind designed a quadrant in 1770 which appears in the text A Synopsis of Practical Mathematics by Alexander Ewing. Four units of the Lind's Quadrant known to be located at: National Museums of Scotland, History of Science Museum in Oxford, Museum Boerhaave, and one in a private collection.

==== Windsor ====
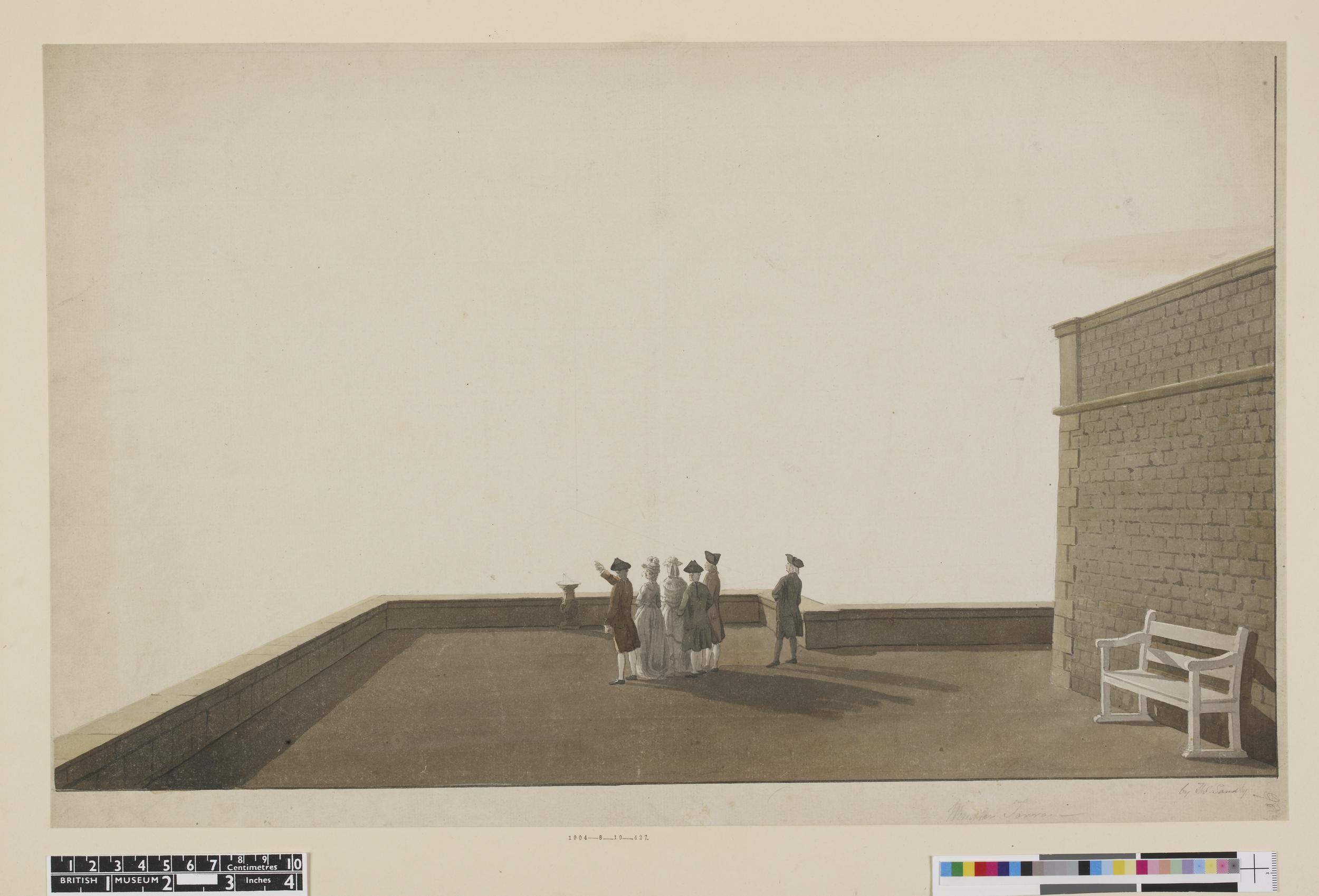
The 1783 Great Meteor at Windsor Castle with figures including: Tiberius Cavallo, Dr Lind, Dr Lockman, Caroline Herschel, and Thomas Sandby looking out towards the meteor on 18 Aug 1783

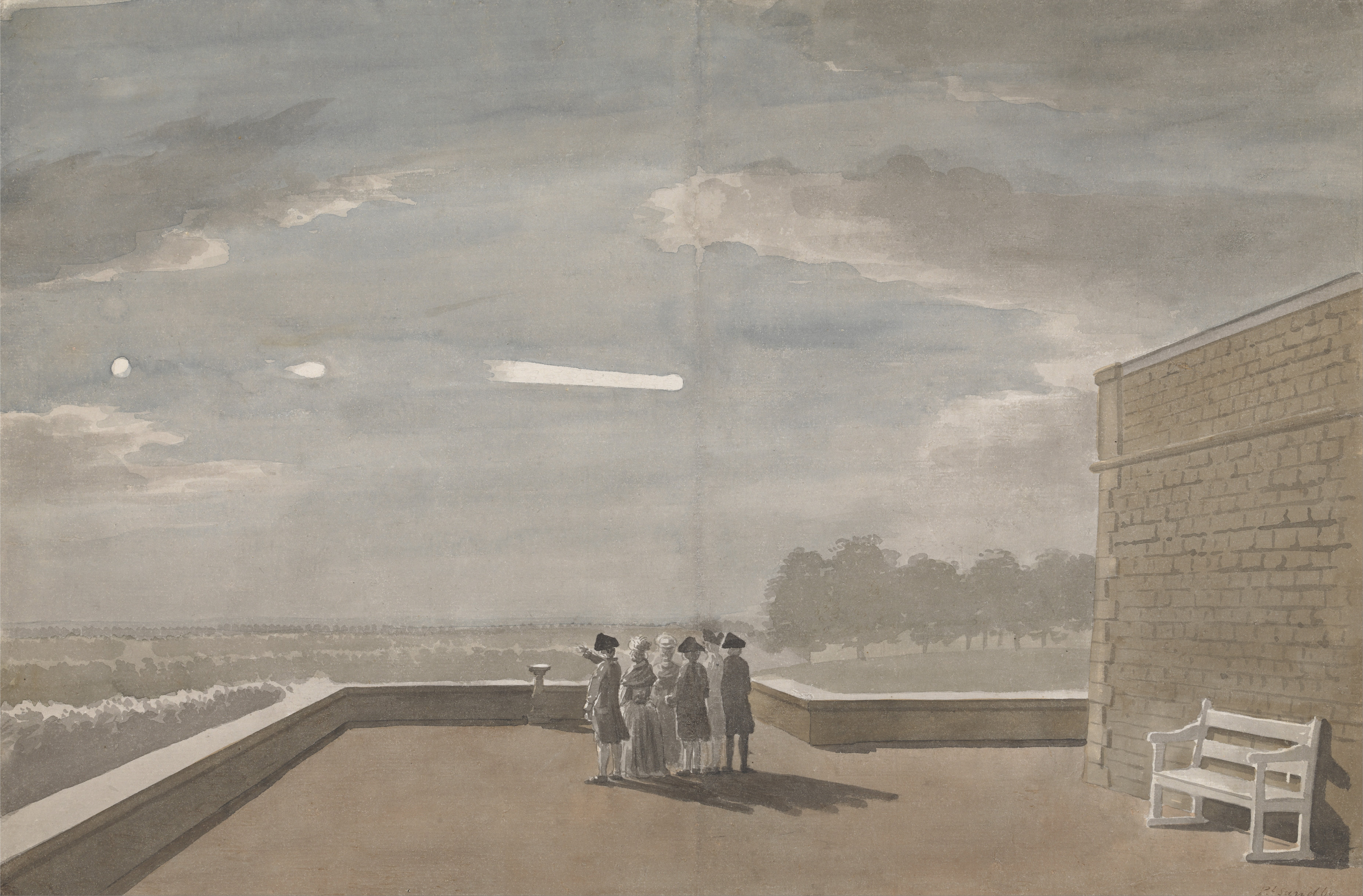
The 1783 Great Meteor, as seen from the East Angle of the North Terrace, Windsor Castle, Paul Sandby's original watercolour. Note the hazy environment of the image, associated with the Laki volcano eruption in that year.

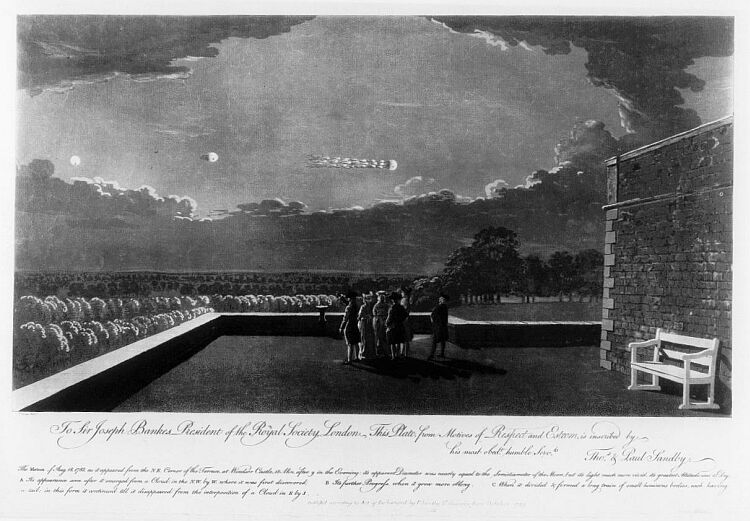
The 1783 Great Meteor, original at the Hunterian Museum and Art Gallery

Lind was elected a Fellow of the Royal Society of London 18 December 1777. Around the same time he seems to have settled at Windsor, where he later became physician to the royal household for King George III. Lind lived on Park Street, Mayfair and was a neighbor of Jean-André Deluc.

Among miscellaneous tasks the King had assigned to Lind, in Jan 1782 Lind planted at cabbage garden intended to protect hares over winter. Lind also advised Joseph Banks, who was George III's adviser for the Royal Botanic Gardens, and Major William Price on agricultural projects such as growing mangelwurzel and lima beans. He helped Queen Charlotte curate and expand scientific collections at the Frogmore House in collaboration with Kew's head gardener William Aiton. In 1795, Lind received a letter from John Lewis Guillemard describing flora and fauna of America and other topics about colonial America. Additionally, specimens Lind collected during voyages to Cape of Good Hope, Comoros Islands, St. Helena, China, Iceland and South Africa were pressed and deposited into the British Museum herbarium. He had corresponded with Carl Linnaeus pertaining to plant classification and specimens from his previous voyages.

Lind was interested in forensics. When the coffin of Edward IV was opened and remains examined at Windsor in 1789 or 1799, Lind made an analysis of the remains and liquid found in it, noting: "The appearance of this liquor was very much like that of walnut-pickle. A dark brown colour, which was rendered very dense by a quantity of matter, principally consisting of very small particles of a woody substance [...] It was inodorous and tasteless, excepting a small degree of roughness or astringency; just like water which has remains some time in a rotten wooden vessel".

==== Astronomy ====
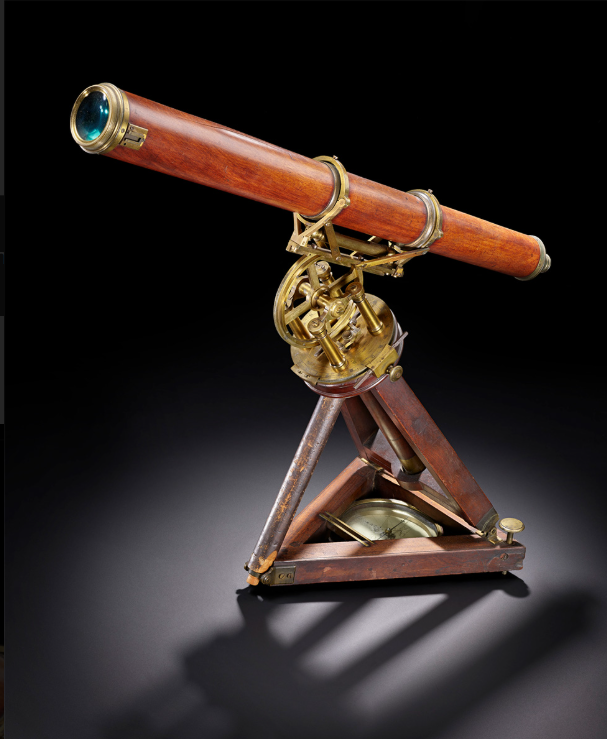
James Lind's telescope from the King George III Collection at the London Science Museum

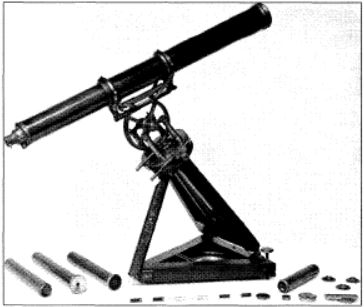
James Lind's 2-foot refracting telescope made by Jesse Ramsden with a lens by Peter Dollond and mounting by John Miller. Used by Lind to view the 1769 transit of Venus.

Letter to Dr. Lind to depart Hay Market for Hawkhill with mention of Jesse Ramsden, Nevil Maskelyne, and John Mitchell

In astronomy, Lind utilized a telescope to observe the transit of Venus from Hawkhill and reported his account to the Royal Society in 1769, and printed with remarks from Nevil Maskelyne. Reverend John Mitchell, Jesse Ramsden and Lind met at Haymarket, London before proceeding to Hawkhill. The telescope is currently part of the King George III Collection at the London Science Museum. Lord Alemore had built Lind an observatory at his house in Hawkhill for this purpose (as noted in a letter from Lord Loudoun) also known as "the observatory of Hawk-hill westward". Lind likewise observed an eclipse of the moon at the same location, the account of which was likewise read to the Royal Society. Lind kept up a correspondence with Patrick Wilson about William Herschel's astronomical works. Lind also traveled with Caroline Herschel to view a comet in Slough. Like William Herschel, Lind believed in cosmic pluralism.

Lind's wife, Ann Elizabeth Mealy, was suggested to have been the first to observed volcanic activity on the moon despite Herschel receiving credit for the observation. The red flashes they observed were later determined to not be volcanic.

On 18 August 1783, Lind observed the 1783 Great Meteor. The bolide was observed from Windsor Castle by Lind, Tiberius Cavallo, John Lockman, Thomas Sandby, and possibly Caroline Herschel. The event has recently has been suggested to have been a historic UFO observation. The artwork by Thomas Sandby and Paul Sandby has prints in the collection at the Hunterian Museum and Art Gallery, British Museum, Yale Center for British Art - Paul Mellon Collection, and others.

==== Military ====
Lind assisted General David Dundas and Major General William Roy with topographical mapping and military triangulation through his astronomy instruments and scientific precision. The Ordnance Survey was commissioned after the Jacobite rising of 1745. In 1771, Roy wrote to Lind about measurements and calculations from Calton Hill, Arthur's Seat, and Kirknewton.

In 1776, Lind and Captain Alexander Blair developed the first rifled cannon. It fired a special one pound led shot and was equipped with a telescopic sight. It was not successfully adopted, although the technologies described became widely used in future weapons.

In 1778, Lind published "Arming Trading Vessels, an Attempt to improve the Method of".

===== Publishing =====
While at Windsor, Lind also had a private press where he published numerous works including Sir Robert Douglas's Peerage of Scotland and The Genealogy of the Families of Lind and the Montgomeries of Smithson, as well as miscellaneous other books, pamphlets, and experimented with typography. Lind also wrote several mysterious encrypted books in characters regarded as "Lindian Ogham" which was suggested by Charles Knight (whose father was acquainted with Lind) to have been an encryption for Illuminati correspondence. Furthermore, Lind collected autographs and may have been interested in phantasmagoria.

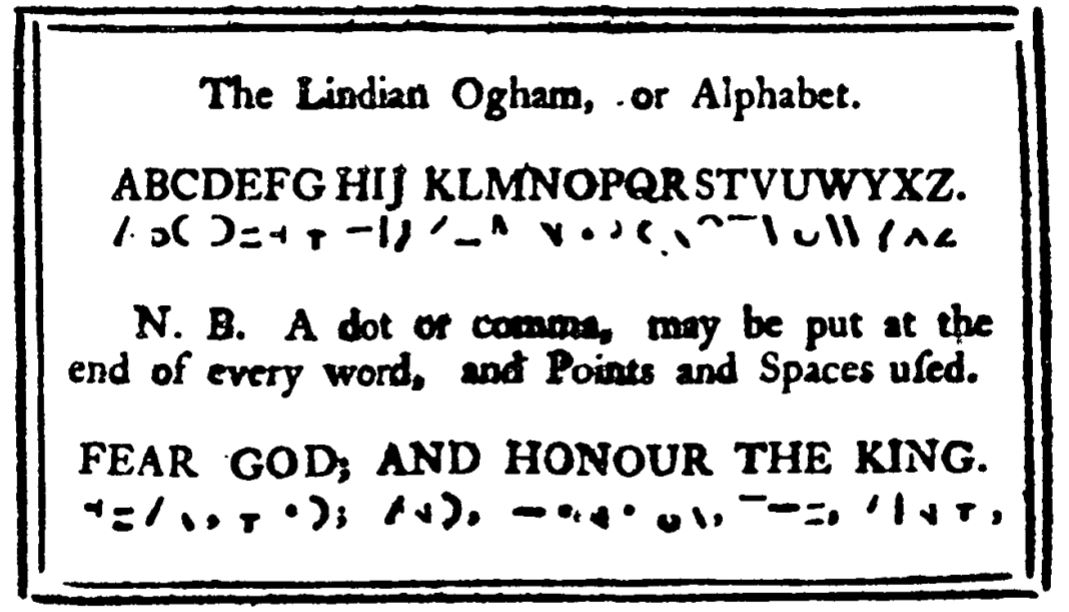
Lindian Ogham

Lind communicated extensively with Cavallo. For example, Lind communicated with Cavallo on the art of silhouette making and made silhouette portraits of George III and Queen Charlotte using the 'Lind process'. Lind made profiles of Frederick the Great, Thomas Paine, Benjamin West, David Hume, Mary Delany, Daniel Solander, Sir Joseph Banks and others. Topics he discussed with Cavallo included paper thickness and black/gold varnish for verre églomisé frames.

===== Scientific and medical experiments =====
Lind suggested the use of electroshock therapy to treat insanity (particularly in the context of treating George III's mental illness) as he had extensively studied and experimented with galvanism, and communicated with Tiberius Cavallo on the subject. In one correspondence, Lind reported successful treatment of a condition similar to postpartum femoral neuropathy (leg paralysis after birth) using 'medical electricity'. Lind may have designed a primitive cardiopulmonary resuscitation machine to revive a patient. In a letter to James Watt, Lind references an electric machine that treats ophthalmia. Lind also believed "animal electricity" was a vital life force. Along the same lines, Guillemard wrote to Lind from the American colonies about Benjamin Rush's part in building The Philadelphia Hospital for the reception of Lunatics as a wing of the Pennsylvania Hospital in 1795.

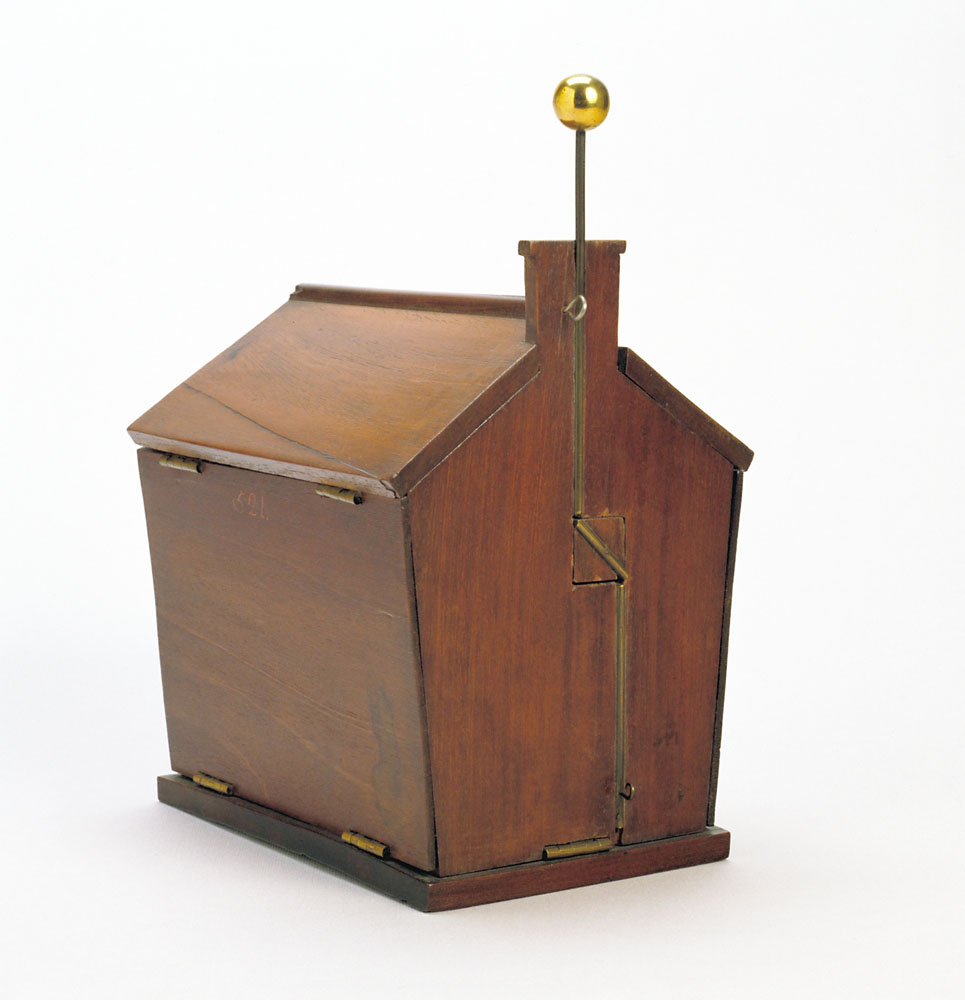
A thunder house in Museo Galileo invented by Lind.

Lind had also invented the "Thunder House" which repeated and verified Benjamin Franklin's lightning rod experiments, and he also attached a long rod to his chimney with a long chain connected to the ground, with a wire connected to the chain entering him room to charge electric Leyden jars and also to make to bells ring. The relationship between Lind and Franklin is documented in letters to James Watt, as well as letters between David Hume and Franklin where Lind is referred to as Brother Lin. Lind also experimented with Franklin's sparking electrostatic machine to animate reptile muscles. Lind made demonstrations of using electricity to make frog legs twitch and "dance" for George III, Queen Charlotte and the royal family.

Lind constructed an earthquake machine (seismograph) which Hugh Davies Griffith of Chester inquired if Lind detected seismic activity after an 1801 earthquake. Lind had a general interest in geology and mineralogy having regularly communicated with James Hutton. Hutton once wrote to Lind and proclaimed, "a bag of gravel is a history to me." Lind was also affiliated with John Michell who had expertise in geology and seismology.

Lind also experimented with distillation. He conducted "Experiments upon the Waters at His Majesty's Dog-Kennel".

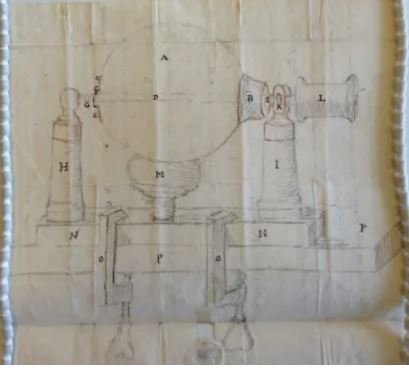
Letter from James Lind to James Watt: Dear Watt I have perfected my great Electrical machine as also a small one which as it pleases much I have sent you a sketch of it as big as the life. I made five of them and they were all taken from me so I believe they will be very saleable – they may be made for 6 or 7 shills. And are worth a guinea in my opinion * – Discription [sic] A the Ball, B a brass cape, C a flat one, D an iron axes, E a shoulder for the brass cap B to rest against, F an Iron nut to screw the ball fast the part of the axes G being screwed, H a pillar with a brass head for the one end of the spindle to run in, I another with the brass head notched for the other end to run in, K a pin to keep it in, L a thorel' to give it its motion with a Drill bow, M the cushion which rises and falls with a screw –N. N the piece of Mahogany into which all is fixed – NB the pillars and cushion screw out at pleasure, O, O, two holdfasts for fixing it to any table without spoiling it. They are noble instruments for the use intended and for a thousand other uses yea. They are more usefull than Putty, P is the table. I have bottle filled with Dutch leaf and coated on the outside with tin leafe and that coating covered with Gold paper. There is also a little scarlet bag for this bottle to keep it in and one for the Ball. When I want a conducter I set a book having a pin in one corner to take the electric Aether. On this book I dance men charge Ellectric bottles etc etc [hole in paper] is thus filled it is very gentile and compleat apparatus – and fit for the pocket of ye Curious. I set out for London in a few weeks. I shall carry two or three of the Drawing Instruments to India with me for part of my venture. I should also be glad to have a dozen of alarms from you which please send soon for my flight may be......[hole in paper] I shall give the money a home. Write me your present life and opinions – and I shall remain ever Mr Watt's Humble servant James Lind Intend one of ye little electrical machines for a present to Dr Franklin. Please procure for me one of Dr Wilson's thermometers for boiling water if possible. Madrass and China is my destination. Perhaps I might sell some machines (perspective) for you at London – perhaps some may wish to carry some to Bengall. * This they may stand you – one about ½ a Guinea [ref. MS 3219/4/56/1], James Watt archives at the Library of Birmingham, https://theironroom.wordpress.com/2019/02/18/watt-2019-february/

In 1787, Lind experimented in treating inflammation and gastrointestinal disorders with mercury. He also invented a "plaster for the cure of White-Swelling" among other medical advancements.

In a letter written in 1796 to Cavallo (originating from Windsor) and published in Cavallo's An Essay on the Medicinal Properties of Factitious Airs (1798), Lind recognized the therapeutic potential of carbon monoxide as hydrocarbonate for treating lung inflammation, the mechanism of which was recently elucidated in 2000 via the mitogen-activated protein kinase pathway and remains a focus of pharmaceutical development efforts. Lind's discovery for the beneficial effects of carbon monoxide to treat inflammation is regarded as a piece of historical irony since Lind is considered to be the inspiration of Dr. Frankenstein, yet, throughout the 1920s (due to widespread cases of carbon monoxide poisoning from civilization's expanding industrial activities, illuminating gas leaks, automobile exhaust exposure, etc.) several medical scientists condemned carbon monoxide as "Frankenstein's monster". Lind's discovery is a significant origin for the field of gasotransmitters in the context of carbon monoxide's neurotransmitter properties and pharmaceutical development of carbon monoxide therapeutics. In the same work, Lind designed a novel inhaler for delivery of hydrocarbonate therapeutic gas.

Inspired by Cavallo, Lind was also interested in ballooning and aerial aerostation flight in the late 1790s. He wrote extensively to James Watt and Joseph Black about hydrogen gas, Antoine Lavoisier's chemistry, and practical balloon improvements such as Boulton's exploding balloon trials. Along these lines, in 1783 George III also sent Lind with Jean-André Deluc to Barnet to inspect a "Machine in the shape of a Bird, which was supposed to be capable of carrying a weight of 800 lbs. thro' the air".

==== Retirement ====
Lind was a peripatetic natural philosophy tutor associated with Eton College while in semi-retirement. Around 1809, he tutored Percy Bysshe Shelley, husband of Mary Shelley, and introduced him to science and the writings of Plato, Voltaire, Franklin, Condorcet, Albertus Magnus, Paracelsus, William Godwin, and others. He was an expert in Pliny and Lucretius.

===== The Revolt of Islam and Frankenstein =====
Percy alluded to Lind in two poems from 1817, the old man or Hermit who rescues Laon in The Revolt of Islam, and Prince Athanase, where he appears as the wise old teacher magus Zonoras. A blind old man also appears in Shelley's posthumous prose work "The Coliseum".

Percy was fascinated with Lind's experiments and demonstrations of galvanism (e.g. using electricity to animate the muscles of dead frogs causing them to jump, or causing the jerking of reptile muscles), hence Lind has been suggested to have been an inspirational origin of Frankenstein. Specifically, it is thought Mary Wollstonecraft Shelley had a nightmare while staying with Percy Shelley at Byron's House in Lake Geneva due to Percy reminiscing about Lind's bizarre experiments. Lind is also thought to be the source for the character of the blind old man, De Lacey, as well as Doctor M. Waldman in the novel Frankenstein. It has been suggested that Lind had an interest in demonology.

Lind is also thought to be a trace influential origin of Dracula.

=== Publications ===
- 1762 - Lind's inaugural dissertation, De Febre Remittente Putrida Paludum quæ grassabatur in Bengalia
- 1768 - dissertation published at Edinburgh.
- 1768 - An Essay on diseases incidental to Europeans in hot climates, with the method of preventing their fatal consequences.
- 1772 - Lind produced a translation of dissertation, Treatise on the Fever of 1762 at Bengal.
- 1769 - In three papers for the Royal Society, Lind discussed: the 1769 transit of Venus observed at Hawkhill, near Edinburgh; an eclipse of the moon, same place and year, with remarks by Nevil Maskelyne
- 1775 - portable wind gauge.
- 1776 - A description of rifled ordnance; Fitted with Sectors, Telescopes, &c. In which is contained, an Account of the Nature and Properties of rifles in general.
- 1787 - An Account of the Efficacy of Mercury in the Cure of Inflammatory Diseases, and the Dysentery.
- 1789 - A catalogue of such Chinese and Japanese plants whose Chinese characters are known and are botanically described.
- 1798 - A letter from Lind appears in Tiberius Cavallo's An Essay on the Medicinal Properties of Factitious Airs.
- 1800 - A Sketch for medical education, emphasized importance of mathematics and scientific rigor in British medical training
- 1803 - Copy of a Letter to the late Thomas Pennant of Downing on Typhus Fevers

==== Letters ====
- "Unpublished Remains of Eminent Persons", p. 239-246, "Thirteen letters, never before published, from the late James Watt, esq. FRS, the celebrated Mechanician, to Dr. James Lind, FRS of Windsor." The Monthly Magazine, Volume 50, Part 2, 1820.
- "A Letter from Dr. James Lind to Mr. Cavallo", p. 475-476, 1784.
- "A bag of gravel is a history to me", p. 56, letter from James Hutton to James Lind, 1772
- "a new machine to pump water", letter from George Dempster of Dunnichen to Lind, 1787
- Letter from John Macgowan, 1788
- Miscellaneous letters between Lind and residents of Birmingham, such as John Carmichael of Birmingham General Hospital (who was formerly engaged to Anne Boulton), are stored in the archives of the Library of Birmingham

==== Miscellaneous ====
- Ticket for Dr. Lind to attend the funeral procession of Vice Admiral Horatio Nelson, 1st Viscount Nelson
- "The Real Shelley: New Views of the Poet's Life, Volume 1", alternative perspective on Lind's mischievous behavior and use of profanity, p. 94-113.
- "Proceedings of the Society of Antiquaries of Scotland, Volume 12", account disputing Lind's appointment as physician to George III, potentially case of mistaken identity with James Lind M.D. of Haslar, 1817, p. 214
- "James Lind, M.D., of Windsor", biography; clarifies distinction from James Lind M.D. of Haslar, p. 626-628.
- Account suggesting Lind was injured by George III
- "The Influence of James Lind MD, FRS on the Scientific and Philosophical Thought of Percy Bysshe Shelley and his circle" by Christopher Goulding (PhD thesis, University of Newcastle upon Tyne, 2002)""
- "An old, old man with hair of silver white: a more scientific image of Shelley's mentor at Eton" by Christopher Goulding, Keats-Shelley Review 14.1 (2000) ""
- "Shelley's Cosmological Sublime: William Herschel, James Lind and 'The Multitudinous Orb" by Christopher Goulding, Review of English Studies 57.232 (Nov 2006) ""
