= James Lind =

Scottish physician (1716–1794)

James Lind FRSE FRCPE
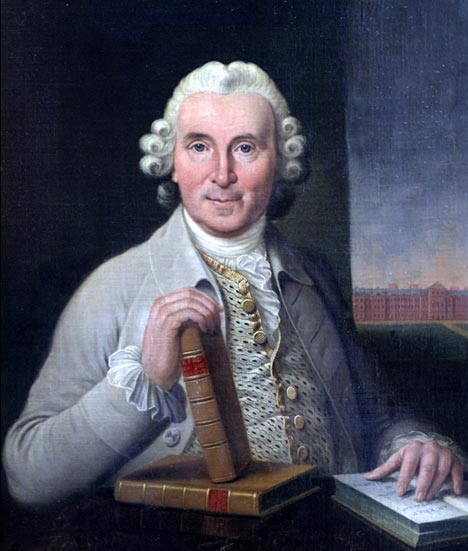
- Born: 4 October 1716; Edinburgh, Scotland
- Died: 13 July 1794 (aged 77); Alverstoke, Hampshire, England
- Education: University of Edinburgh (MD 1748); Royal College of Physicians of Edinburgh (LRCPE)
- Known for: Prevention of maritime diseases and cure for scurvy
- Children: James Lind (naturalist)
- Medical career
- Profession: Military surgeon
- Institutions: Surgeon, Royal Navy (1739–1748); Physician, Edinburgh (1748–1758); Senior Physician, Haslar Naval Hospital (1758–1783)
- Sub-specialties: Naval hygiene

James Lind (4 October 1716 – 13 July 1794) was a Scottish physician. He was a pioneer of naval hygiene in the Royal Navy. By conducting one of the first ever clinical trials, he developed the theory that citrus fruits cured scurvy. Lind served in the Royal Navy and then went onto private practice. In 1758 he was appointed chief physician of the Royal Naval Hospital Haslar, then one of the largest hospitals in the world. While chief physician, Lind argued for the health benefits of better ventilation aboard naval ships, the improved cleanliness of sailors' bodies, clothing and bedding, and below-deck fumigation with sulphur and arsenic. He also proposed that fresh water could be obtained by distilling sea water. He retired in 1783 and was awarded a large pension by the naval commissioners. Lind advanced the practice of preventive medicine and improved human understanding of nutrition.

== Early life ==
Lind was born on 4 October in Edinburgh, Scotland, in 1716 into a family of merchants, then headed by his father, James Lind. His family were related to a number of prominent Linds in the city, including George Lind and his cousin, James Lind, also a noted physician. His mother was Margaret Smellum, daughter of a merchant and town burgess. He had an elder sister, as well as a younger brother. It is not known for certain where he attended school but he learnt Greek and Latin (some sources suggest that he was educated at the Royal High School, Edinburgh but it is not confirmed).

In December 1731, he began his medical studies as an apprentice of George Langlands, a fellow of the Incorporation of Surgeons which preceded the Royal College of Surgeons of Edinburgh. His duties as apprentice included mixing chemicals and basic medicines, cleaning and general chores, dressing wounds and bleeding lesser patients.

== Royal Navy ==
After some 8 years as an apprentice, Lind decided to go to London to find a job in medicine and, in 1739, he joined the Royal Navy, his younger brother being a junior naval officer. He was examined at the Navy Office and Surgeon's Hall and then appointed to the position of surgeon's mate. Lind spent long periods with ships on blockade and patrol in the English Channel and Atlantic Ocean during the War of the Austrian Succession. Lind served in the squadron of Nicholas Haddock who blockaded the coast of Spain in the early 1740s. This included managing the effects of a major sea epidemic of typhus that affected the fleet. Lind also served in the Mediterranean, off the coast of West Africa and in the West Indies. While at sea, alongside his normal duties, Lind made extensive records and medical observations on everything related to disease and hygiene on ships. He reported back to England on the poor hospital facilities for sick sailors in Mahón.

By 1747, he had become ship surgeon of HMS Salisbury in the Channel Fleet, and had decided to conduct an experiment on the prevention and treatment of scurvy while that ship was patrolling the Bay of Biscay. This was carried out from 20 May 1747 with twelve patients and the application of dietary supplements, that varied by subgroup, including consumption of citrus fruits, herbs, pastes, cider vinegar and other treatments, with those having consumed the citrus fruits the best treated. Shortly after his first scurvy experiment in 1748, Lind retired from active sea service with the Navy.

== Later life ==
After he left the Navy, Lind wrote his MD thesis on venereal diseases (entitled 'De morbis venereis localibus') and subsequently earned his degree from the University of Edinburgh Medical School. He was then granted a licence from the Royal College of Physicians of Edinburgh to practise in Edinburgh. He then practised privately as a physician in Edinburgh. Alongside his private practice, Lind studied and gathered extensive research on the topic of scurvy and published his first treatise on Scurvy in 1753 with the Scottish publisher Kincaid and Donaldson in Edinburgh, dedicating it to Lord Anson.

In the summer of 1758, he was appointed chief physician of the Royal Naval Hospital Haslar at Gosport. The hospital was purpose built to be the primary medical facility for the Royal Navy and had opened officially just over four years earlier, with Lind appointed to as the second holder of the chief physician's post. It is believed that Lord Anson had directly sponsored him for the role and it came with a salary of 200 pounds a year. The position was largely administrative in nature and involved overall responsibility for on average 1,500 patients on the site on a given day. Lind reported directly to the Sick and Hurt Board Commissioners of the Admiralty. In his first two years as chief physician, Lind record 5,735 patients in the hospital, with 1,146 showing signs of scurvy which he ordered treated, conducting research and testing effective remedies while in his role. Lind was able to use his time at Haslar to produce new editions of his great works on scurvy, naval hygiene and tropical medicine.

Lind retired in 1783 and was awarded a large pension by the naval commissioners, with it being recorded this was an unusual arrangement but commensurate with his long medical service. His son John succeeded him as chief physician. In 1783, alongside his cousin, he was one of the founding members of the Royal Society of Edinburgh.

=== Death ===
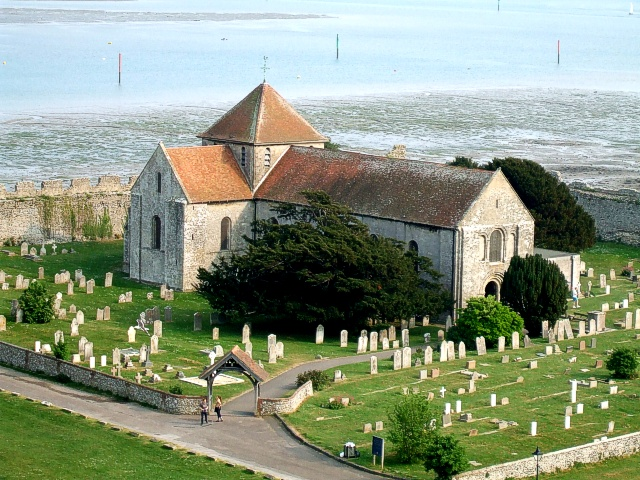
St Mary's Parish Churchyard in Portchester where Lind is buried

Lind died at Gosport in Hampshire on 13 July 1794. He was buried in St Mary's Parish Churchyard in Portchester.

== Family ==
Lind married Isabella Dickie and had two sons, John and James. In 1773, he was living on Princes Street in a brand-new house facing Edinburgh Castle.

John FRSE (1751–1794), his elder son, studied medicine at St Andrews University and graduated in 1777, then succeeded his father as chief physician at Haslar Hospital in 1783. James (1765–1823), also embarked on a career with the British navy. His cousin was James Lind (1736–1812).

James rose to the rank of post-captain, and was notable for his role in the Battle of Vizagapatam in the Bay of Bengal in 1804, for which he was knighted.

== Research, writings and Legacy ==
=== Prevention and cure of scurvy ===
Scurvy is a disease caused by a vitamin C deficiency, but in Lind's day, the concept of vitamins was unknown. Vitamin C is necessary for healthy connective tissue. In 1740, the catastrophic result of then-Commodore George Anson's circumnavigation attracted much attention in Europe; out of 1900 men, 1400 died, most of them allegedly from scurvy. According to Lind, scurvy caused more deaths in the British fleets than French and Spanish arms.

Since antiquity in some parts of the world, and since the 17th century in England, it had been known that citrus fruit had an antiscorbutic effect. John Woodall (1570–1643), an English military surgeon of the British East India Company recommended them but their use did not become widespread. John Fryer (1650–1733) too noted in 1698 the value of citrus fruits in curing sailors of scurvy. Although Lind was not the first to suggest citrus as a cure for scurvy, he was the first to study its effect by a systematic experiment in 1747. It was one of the first reported, controlled, clinical experiments in history, particularly because of its use of control groups.

Lind thought that scurvy was due to putrefaction of the body that could be helped by acids, so he included an acidic dietary supplement in the experiment. This began after two months at sea when the ship was afflicted with scurvy. He divided twelve scorbutic sailors into six groups of two. They all received the same diet, but in addition group one was given a quart of cider daily, group two twenty-five drops of elixir of vitriol (sulfuric acid), group three six spoonfuls of vinegar, group four half a pint of seawater, group five two oranges and one lemon, and the last group a spicy paste plus a drink of barley water. The treatment of group five stopped after six days when they ran out of fruit, but by that time one sailor was fit for duty while the other had almost recovered. Apart from that, only group one showed any effect from its treatment.

In 1753, he published A treatise of the scurvy, which was mostly ignored. When James Cook went on his first voyage, he carried wort (0.1 mg vitamin C per 100 g), sauerkraut (10–15 mg per 100 g) and a syrup, or "rob", of oranges and lemons (the juice contains 40–60 mg of vitamin C per 100 g) as antiscorbutics, but only the results of the trials on wort were published. In 1762, Lind's second publication appeared, An Essay on the most effectual means of preserving the health of seamen appeared. In it he recommended growing salad—i.e. watercress (43 mg vitamin C per 100 g)—on wet blankets. This was put into practice, and, in the winter of 1775, the British Army in North America was supplied with mustard and cress seeds. However Lind, like most of the medical profession, believed that scurvy came from ill-digested and putrefying food within the body, bad water, excessive work, and living in a damp atmosphere that prevented healthful perspiration. Thus, while he recognised the benefits of citrus fruit (although he weakened the effect by switching to a boiled concentrate or "rob", in which the boiling process destroys vitamin C), he never advocated citrus juice as a single solution. He believed that scurvy had multiple causes which therefore required multiple remedies.

The medical establishment ashore continued to believe that scurvy was a disease of putrefaction, curable by the administration of elixir of vitriol, infusions of wort and other remedies designed to 'ginger up' the system. It could not account for the effect of citrus fruits and so dismissed the evidence of them as unproven and anecdotal. In the Navy however, experience had convinced many officers and surgeons that citrus juices provided the answer to scurvy, even if the reason was unknown. Gilbert Blane and Thomas Trotter also naval physicians expanded on Lind's research, advocating for the need for citrus fruits and vegetables to be issued to ship's crew. On the insistence of senior officers, led by Rear Admiral Alan Gardner in 1794, lemon juice was issued on board the Suffolk on a twenty-three-week, non-stop voyage to India. The daily ration of two-thirds of an ounce mixed in grog contained just about the minimum daily intake of 10 mg vitamin C. There was no serious outbreak of scurvy. This resulted in widespread demand for lemon juice, backed by the Sick and Hurt Board whose numbers had recently been augmented by two practical naval surgeons who knew of Lind's experiments with citrus. The following year, the Admiralty accepted the Board's recommendation that lemon juice be issued routinely to the whole fleet. Another Scot, Archibald Menzies, brought citrus plants to Kealakekua Bay in Hawaii on the Vancouver Expedition, to help the Navy re-supply in the Pacific. This was not the end of scurvy in the Navy, as lemon juice was at first in such short supply that it could only be used in home waters under the direction of surgeons, rather than as a preventative. Only after 1800 did the supply increase so that, at the insistence of Admiral Lord St Vincent, it began to be issued generally.

=== Prevention of typhus ===
Lind noticed that typhus disappeared from the top floor of his hospital, where patients were bathed and given clean clothes and bedding. However, incidence was very high on the lower floors where such measures were not in place. Lind recommended that sailors be stripped, shaved, scrubbed, and issued clean clothes and bedding regularly. Thereafter, British seamen did not suffer from typhus, giving the British navy a significant advantage over the French. He published two papers on fevers and infection in 1763.

=== Fresh water from the sea ===
In the 18th century, ships took along water in casks, as well as other drinks such as beer, spirits, cordial and milk in casks. According to the Regulations and Instructions relating to His Majesty's Service at Sea, which had been published in 1733 by the Admiralty, sailors were entitled to a gallon of weak beer daily (5/6 of a British gallon, equivalent to the modern American gallon or slightly more than three and a half litres). As the beer had been boiled in the brewing process, it was reasonably free from bacteria and lasted for months, unlike water. In the Mediterranean, wine was also issued, often fortified with brandy. A typical frigate with 240 men, with stores for four months, carried more than one hundred tons of drinkable liquid. Water quality depended on its source, the condition of casks and for how long it had been kept. The longer the voyage, particularly in a warmer climate would see water become stagnant and in many cases unusable. Furthermore, when water was scarce, it was rationed and rain collected with spread sails. Although fresh water was obtained when possible en voyage at local harbours and beaches, watering places were not always potable and in some places near the sea, were marshy or contaminated with salt, and in the tropics infested with malaria. For this reason, Lind, as well as others had long established attempts to distil fresh water from salt water. In 1759, Lind discovered that steam from heated salt water was fresh and capable for use on ships. He trialled a variety of methods but eventually perfected a conventional plant involving a tea-kettle, musket barrel and cask that allowed one gallon of fresh water to be made every three hours using a small heat source. In 1762, his method was proposed formally before the Royal Society in London and subsequently published in March 1763 on instruction of the Lords Commissioners of the Admiralty for use at sea. Fresh water was distilled on some ships using his method (including on the circumnavigation of HMS Dolphin in 1768) but it was not until later adaptations by others (especially with steam power) that distillation was possible on a useful scale for a whole ship.

=== Tropical disease ===
Lind's final work was published in 1768; the Essay on Diseases Incidental to Europeans in Hot Climates, with the Method of Preventing their fatal Consequences. It was a work on the symptoms and treatments of tropical disease, but was not specific to naval medicine and served more as a general text for doctors and British emigrants. The Essay was used as a medical text in Britain for fifty years following publication. Seven editions were printed, including two after Lind's death.

== Recognition ==
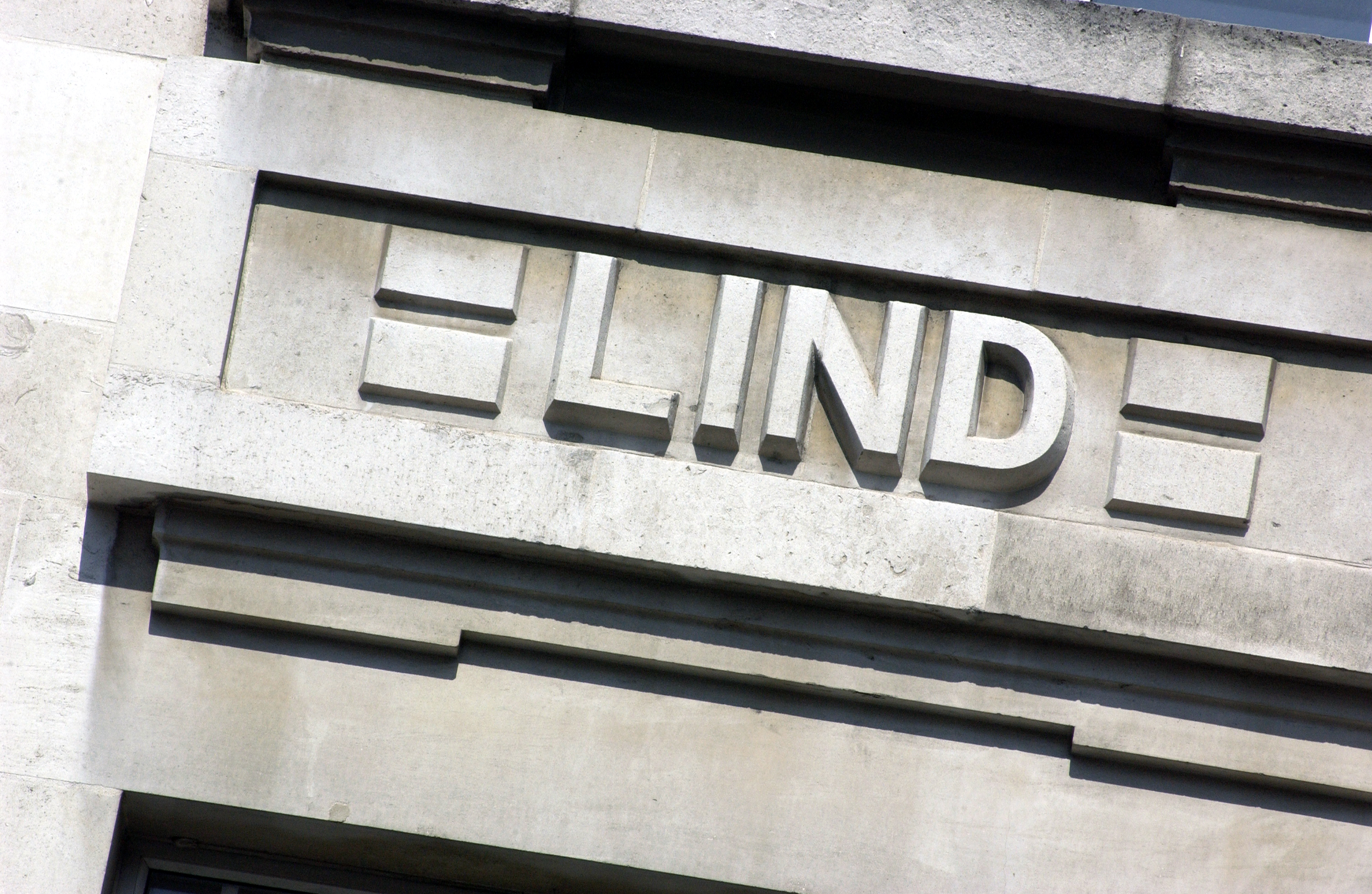
James Lind's name on the Frieze of LSHTM

Lind's is one of twenty-three names on the Frieze of the London School of Hygiene and Tropical Medicine building in Keppel Street, London. Names were selected by a committee of unknown constitution who deemed them to be pioneers in public health and tropical medicine. At University of Edinburgh Medical School there is the James Lind commemorative plaque unveiled in 1953, funded by citrus growers of California and Arizona.

The James Lind Alliance is named after him.

The James Lind Library is a not-for-profit, open-access electronic library on medical treatment, funded by the Swiss National Science Foundation.

== Bibliography ==
- Harvie, David (2002). Limeys: the True Story of One Man's War against Ignorance, the Establishment and the Deadly Scurvy. Stroud: Sutton Publishing. ISBN 978-0-7509-3993-5.
