= Thunder house =

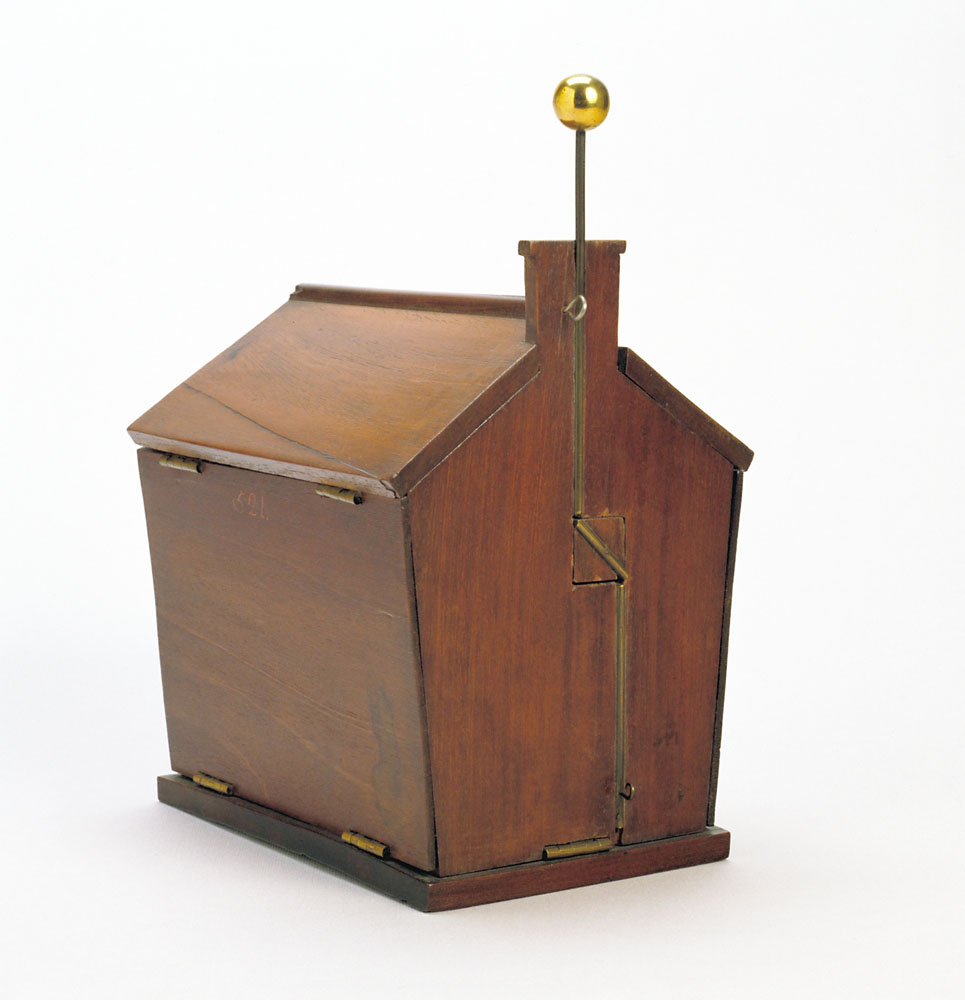
A thunder house in Museo Galileo.

The thunder house is a scientific model invented by James Lind which gives a spectacular demonstration of the destructive effect of a lightning bolt striking a house with an imperfect lightning conductor.

The small wooden house has hinged walls and carries a brass rod representing a lightning rod. A section of the conductor runs along a piece of wood placed on the façade. Inside the house is a spark gap housed in a small brass cylinder containing a small quantity of gunpowder.

When the piece of wood is removed, the lightning-conductor circuit is broken. The lightning bolt, simulated by a spark generated by a Leyden jar, ignites the powder, whose explosion causes the house to collapse. If, instead, the piece of wood is positioned correctly, the electricity will be discharged to the ground, leaving the house intact. Filippo Lucci depicted a similar device in the Stanzino of the Matematiche of the Uffizi Gallery in 1780—clear evidence of the popularity of such demonstrations in the late eighteenth century. The same phenomenon is also visible through the use of a similar instrument called Thunder Obelisk.

== Bibliography ==
- Miniati, Mara, ed. (1991). Museo di storia della scienza: catalogo (in Italian). Firenze: Giunti. p. 248, board n. 50. ISBN 88-09-20036-5.
- Willem D. Hackmann, ed. (1995). Catalogue of pneumatical, magnetical and electrical instruments (in Italian). Firenze: Giunti. p. 140, board n. 163. ISBN 88-09-20732-7.
