= George Lind =

Scottish merchant (1700 - 1763)

George Lind (1700–1763) was an 18th-century Scottish merchant who served as Lord Provost of Edinburgh 1760–1761 and Member of Parliament for Edinburgh 1761–1763.

== Life ==
He was born around 1700 the son of George Lind of Gorgie, then just west of Edinburgh, by his second wife, Jean Montgomery of Smithton. His father was a merchant and bailie in Edinburgh.

In 1761 he was selected as a rival candidate to Alexander Forrester and John Fordyce, banker, as MP for Edinburgh and succeeded in this, then stepping down as Lord Provost. In his role as MP he was conservator to Scottish privileges in the Netherlands. His position as Lord Provost was filled by George Drummond, who had held the role twice before.

He resigned as an MP in May 1763 being replaced by John Home (1722-1808) and died on 11 June 1763.

== Family ==
He did not marry but is thought to be great uncle to the Edinburgh builder David Lind (1797-1856) who was the building contractor for the Scott Monument. He was distantly related to James Lind.
