= James Lind Alliance =

British non-profit

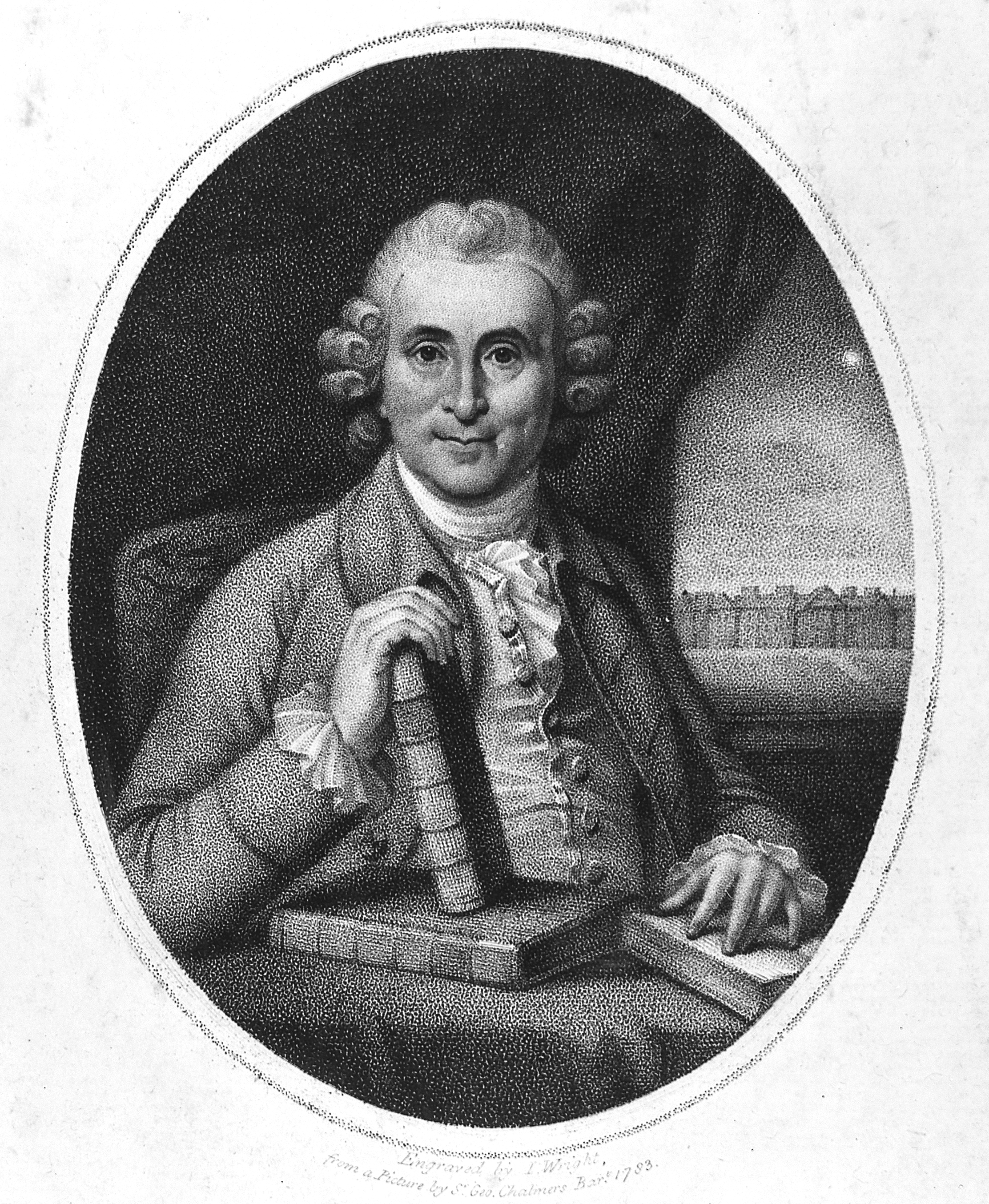
James Lind 1716–1794

The James Lind Alliance is a UK-based non-profit making initiative, established in 2004. It was established to bring patients, carers and clinicians together, in Priority Setting Partnerships, to identify and prioritise unanswered questions or evidence uncertainties that they agree are the most important. The intention is to ensure that those who fund health research are aware of what matters to patients, carers and clinicians who need to use the research in their everyday lives.

The National Institute for Health and Care Research (NIHR) funds the coordination of the JLA, but Priority Setting Partnerships find their own resources to fund their partnership. In 2016 the James Lind Alliance was granted the Societal Award of the Foundation Federation of Dutch Medical Scientific Societies (Federa) for their initiative to bring patients into partnerships for research priorities.

== Background ==
Research on the effects of treatments often overlooks the shared interests of patients and clinicians. As a result, questions they both consider important are not addressed. The pharmaceutical and medical technology industries and academia play essential roles in developing new treatments, but their priorities are not necessarily the same as those of patients and clinicians. For this reason many areas of potentially valuable research are neglected. Bringing patients and clinicians together to jointly prioritise unanswered questions is thought to be rare.

== Method of operation ==
The James Lind Alliance brings together patients and patient representatives, carers and clinicians, as individuals or represented by groups, to form Priority Setting Partnerships, focusing on specific health conditions or settings. For example, the Asthma Priority Setting Partnership was led by Asthma UK and the British Thoracic Society, while the Urinary Incontinence Priority Setting Partnership was led by the Bladder & Bowel Foundation and the Cochrane Incontinence Group, part of the Cochrane Collaboration.

Priority Setting Partnerships work together to gather uncertainties from patients, carers and clinicians. The uncertainties are all checked to ensure they cannot be answered by existing knowledge, research or sources of information.

The uncertainties then go through a process of prioritisation, which culminates in a top ten list of priorities for research, shared by patients, carers and clinicians. To date, the process has been completed for over 160 health areas in the UK and internationally, including Urinary Incontinence, Anaesthesia and Perioperative Care, Living With and Beyond Cancer, Intensive Care, Stroke, Cystic Fibrosis, Oral and Dental Health, Mental Health in Children and Young People, Cardiac Arrest (Canada), Congenital Heart Disease, Problematic Hip Replacement, Palliative and End of Life Care, Veterans' Health, and Surgery for Common Shoulder Problems.

== James Lind ==
The Alliance is named after a pioneer of clinical trials, James Lind (1716–1794). Two hundred and fifty years ago, there were many conflicting ideas and unanswered questions about how to treat the deadly disease scurvy. Lind, a Scottish naval surgeon, decided to confront this uncertainty by treating his patients within a clinical trial comparing six of the proposed remedies. His trial showed that oranges and lemons were dramatically better than the other supposed treatments.
