= James Lind (Royal Navy officer) =

British naval officer

Captain Sir James Lind KCB
- Born: c. 1752
- Died: 12 June 1823 (aged 71); Portsmouth, Hampshire
- Military career
- Allegiance: United Kingdom
- Branch: Royal Navy
- Service years: 1765–1823
- Rank: Captain
- Commands: HMS Wilhelmina; HMS Sheerness; HMS Centurion
- Conflicts: American Revolutionary War; French Revolutionary Wars; Napoleonic Wars; Battle of Visakhapatnam

Captain Sir James Lind KCB (c. 1752 – 12 June 1823) was a Royal Navy officer who served in the American War of Independence and French Revolutionary and Napoleonic Wars. The son of James Lind, a distinguished naval physician, Lind also embarked on a career at sea, but served in a more front line role. After serving on a number of different ships he finally received his own command in 1800, but his first chance to show his ability came only in 1803 when in command of HMS Sheerness. Here he captured a French privateer after his imitation of a merchant ship encouraged the privateer to actually attack his heavily armed frigate. He then revealed the true nature of his ship and the hapless privateer had no choice but to swiftly surrender.

Promoted to command the 50-gun HMS Centurion Lind had another opportunity to distinguish himself, when the convoy under his protection was attacked in the harbour of Visakhapatnam by a heavily armed French squadron under Rear-Admiral Charles-Alexandre Durand Linois. Despite being on shore at the time Lind hurried back to take command and supervise operations to resist the French, who though were able to capture one of the merchants, decided not to risk pressing the attack on the Centurion and withdrew. The survival of the Centurion in the face of overwhelming forces was hailed as a great achievement back home in Britain, with Lind being knighted for his efforts.

== Family and early life ==
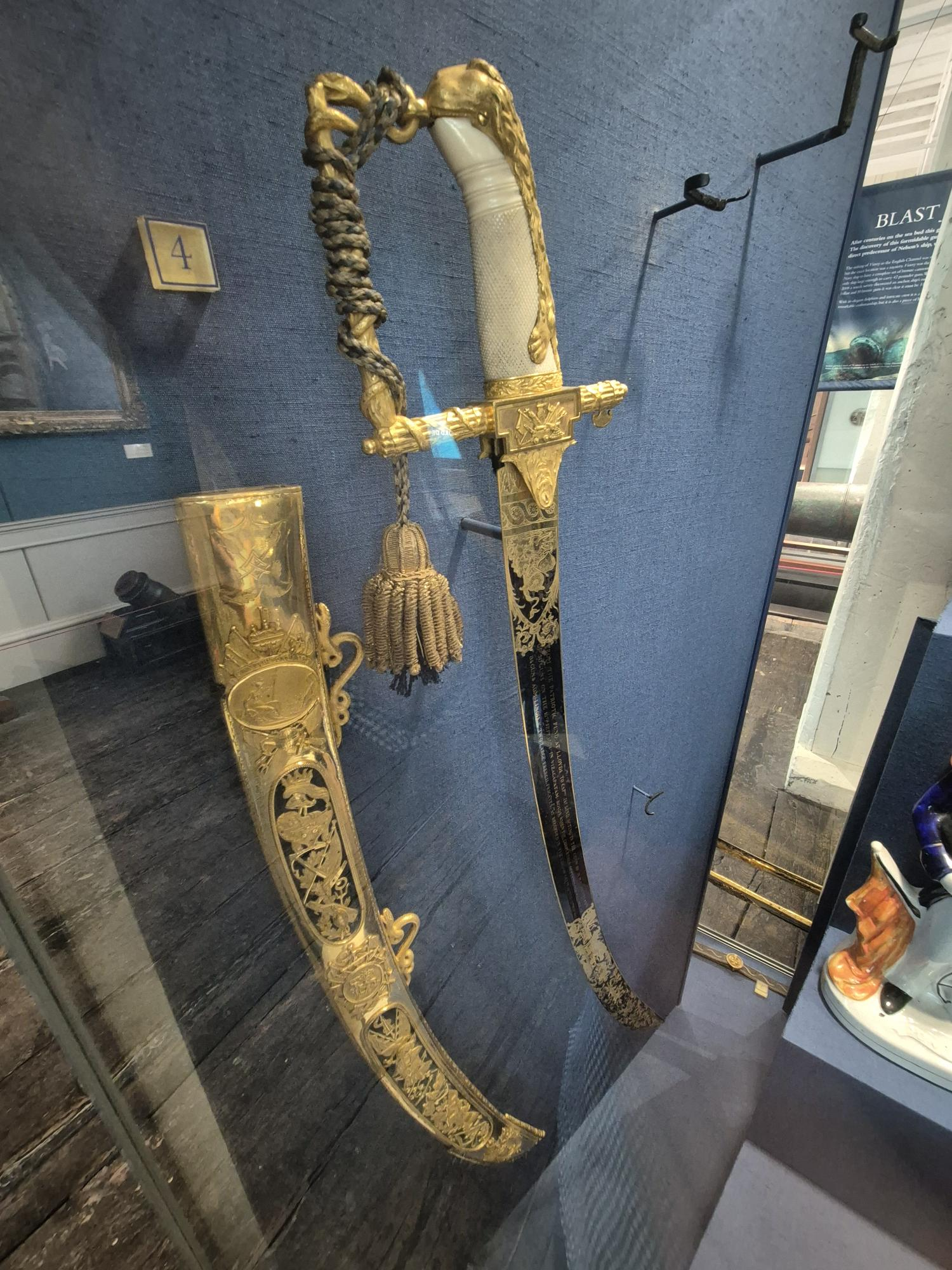
Lloyds sword of £100 value of Captain James Lind, awarded as commander of HMS Centurion, at the Royal Navy Museum

Sir James was the son of James Lind, who was at that time the physician of the Royal Naval Hospital at Haslar and a pioneer into the use of lemon juice as a treatment for scurvy. His mother was Isabel Lind, née Dickie. Sir James was also a cousin to James Lind who was the Royal physician to King George III and a distinguished multidisciplinary natural philosopher. Sir James's grandfather was likewise named James Lind.

He embarked on a naval career, joining Captain Samuel Thompson's 54-gun HMS Rippon on 1 August 1765. Lind spent the first part of his career serving in North American waters, but returned to British waters with his transfer on 20 September 1769 to Captain Michael Clements's 70-gun HMS Dorsetshire. His advancement to midshipman occurred during this time, and by early 1770 he was aboard the 28-gun HMS Carysfort. His service on the Carysfort only lasted a few months, and was followed by a transfer to the 20-gun HMS Dolphin under Captain Digby Dent. Dent was succeeded by Captain Henry Lloyd, who took the Dolphin to the East Indies with Lind still aboard her. Lind transferred again on 10 March 1772, joining the 68-gun HMS Northumberland, which at that time was the flagship of Admiral Sir Robert Harland.

Lind's service on the Northumberland lasted until 29 May 1775, and was followed by service in the English Channel aboard the 32-gun HMS Arethusa, by now under his old captain, Digby Dent. Lind joined Captain Mark Robinson's 64-gun HMS Worcester on 13 February 1776, moving again on 21 April that year to Commodore William Hotham's HMS Preston. Hotham and Lind served on the North American station, with Lind being promoted to master's mate during this time. Late January 1778 brought another new ship for Lind, when he joined Captain George Elphinstone's 20-gun HMS Perseus as an acting-lieutenant. He was still an acting-lieutenant by the time he joined HMS Monmouth, but whilst he was aboard her his commission was confirmed and he joined the 74-gun HMS Alfred under Captain William Bayne on 31 October 1780.

== Inter-war years and return to service ==
The end of the American War of Independence left Lind without a ship, and he spent between 26 July 1783 and 13 May 1790 unemployed. The Nootka Sound crisis in 1790 led to a general rearmament, and Lind joined the 80-gun HMS Gibraltar under Captain Samuel Goodall. Goodall was promoted to rear-admiral in October, and raised his flag aboard the 90-gun HMS London, taking Lind with him when he did so. Lind spent the next few years serving with Goodall on his flagships, the 50-gun HMS Romney from 22 March 1792, and the 98-gun HMS Princess Royal from 24 May 1793. He was second lieutenant aboard the Princess Royal, which was stationed in the Mediterranean, and two years after the start of the French Revolutionary Wars, Lind was promoted to commander on 2 November 1795. Despite this he had to wait five years before he received a ship of his own to command, the troopship HMS Wilhelmina on 26 August 1800.

== East Indies ==
The Wilhelmina was part of a force despatched under Sir Home Popham to pass through the Red Sea and attack the French in Egypt. After this operation Lind remained in the East Indies, transferring to the 44-gun HMS Sheerness on 16 March 1803. He was promoted to post-captain on 6 March 1804, taking command of the Sheerness. On 5 May 1804 the 14-gun French privateer Alfred spotted the Sheerness, but mistaking her for a merchant, closed on her. Realising his opponent's mistake Lind pretended to make an attempt to escape, imitating the actions of a merchant ship. The Alfred caught up, and firing a broadside at the Sheerness demanded that she strike her colours. Lind promptly returned a broadside of his own which killed three of the Alfred's crew and wounded six, revealing the Sheerness to be a fully armed frigate. The crew of the Alfred realised their mistake, but trapped under the Sheerness's guns had no choice but to immediately surrender.

=== Centurion and Visakhapatnam ===
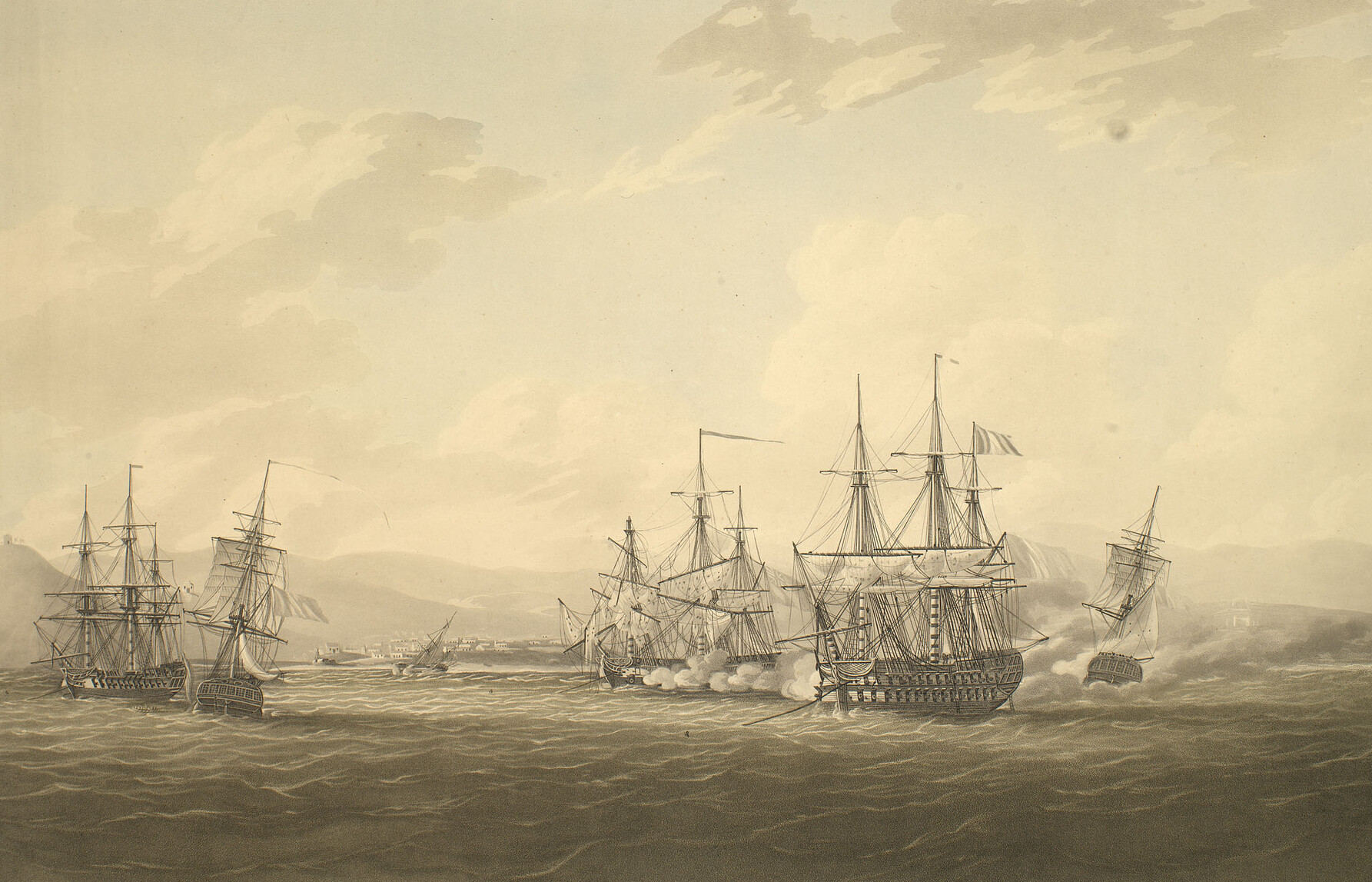
Engraving of the Battle of Visakhapatnam

The commander of the East Indies station, Admiral Peter Rainier had initially assigned Lind's old command, HMS Wilhelmina, to escort a convoy of two East Indiamen. News of the convoy and its light escort reached Rear-Admiral Charles-Alexandre Durand Linois, who was in command of a squadron raiding merchant shipping in the area, and deciding the odds were favourable, decided to attempt to capture the convoy. Unbeknownst to Linois, Rainier had decided to upgrade the convoy's escort and replaced the Wilhelmina with the 50-gun HMS Centurion, placing Lind in temporary command, as Centurion's nominal commander Captain John Spratt Rainier had been taken ill. Lind took command on 9 September, but had gone ashore during a stop at Visakhapatnam when Linois's forces, consisting of the 74-gun Marengo and the frigates Sémillante and Atalante appeared on 18 September.

Lieutenant James Robert Phillips had been left in command while Lind was on shore, and opened fire on the approaching French. As soon as Lind realised what was happening he tried to return to his ship, but the Indian boatmen refused to row him out, until the French moved further away. A brief lull in the fighting allowed Lind to return to his ship, but he found the Centurion's rigging had been too badly damaged to allow him to pursue the French. Instead he anchored between the French and the merchants, placing himself between them but out of range of supporting fire from the shore batteries. He attempted to arrange for cannon to be brought to the beach to provide covering fire, but this proved to be impractical.

The Marengo then returned to the scene, anchoring out of the range of all but Lind's largest guns on Centurion's lower deck. Linois now used his longer range guns to pound the Centurion while the frigate Atalante moved in to harass her at close range. While Lind was thus occupied, the second frigate, Sémillante evaded Centurion and took possession of one of the East Indiamen, sailing her out of the harbour. Having grabbed a prize Linois moved his ships away from the harbour and departed, declining to continue to press the attack on Centurion. The British had lost both merchants, one to the French, while the other had been run aground and wrecked to prevent her capture. However the survival of the Centurion and her spirited fight against overwhelming odds was widely hailed as a victory in itself back in Britain. Lind returned to Britain and received a knighthood on 5 April 1805 for his services. He was awarded a Lloyd's Patriotic Fund presentation sword of £100 value.

== Later life ==
Lind appears to have retired from active service after this. He was appointed a Knight Commander of the Order of the Bath on 2 January 1815, and died on 12 June 1823 at Southampton.
