= Photographers of the American Civil War =

The American Civil War was the most photographed conflict of the 19th century. Images were widely copied and distributed to the public via newspapers, prints, and carte de visite. Roughly 70% of the war's documentary photography was taken by a stereo camera, which produced 3-dimensional images that could be viewed on a stereoscope.

== Historical context ==
The American Civil War (1861–1865) was the fifth war in history to be photographed, the first four being the Mexican–American War (1846–1848), the Crimean War (1853–1856), Indian Rebellion of 1857 and the Second Italian War of Independence (1859).

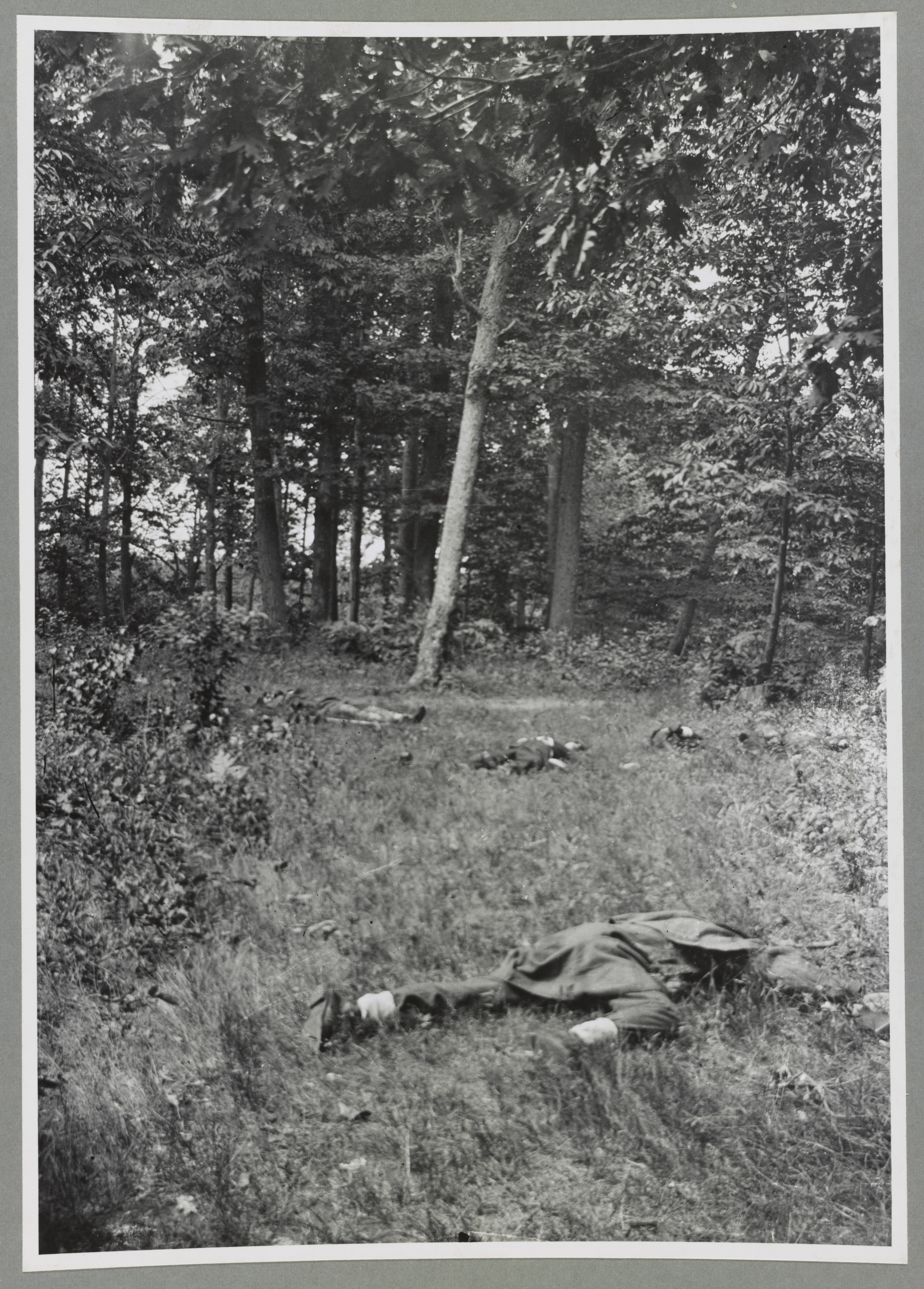
Staged picture with caption "Confederate dead on Matthews Hill, Bull Run" (Brady Handy Collection)

General Hartfrant and staff photographed by Alexander Gardner, 1865, colorized

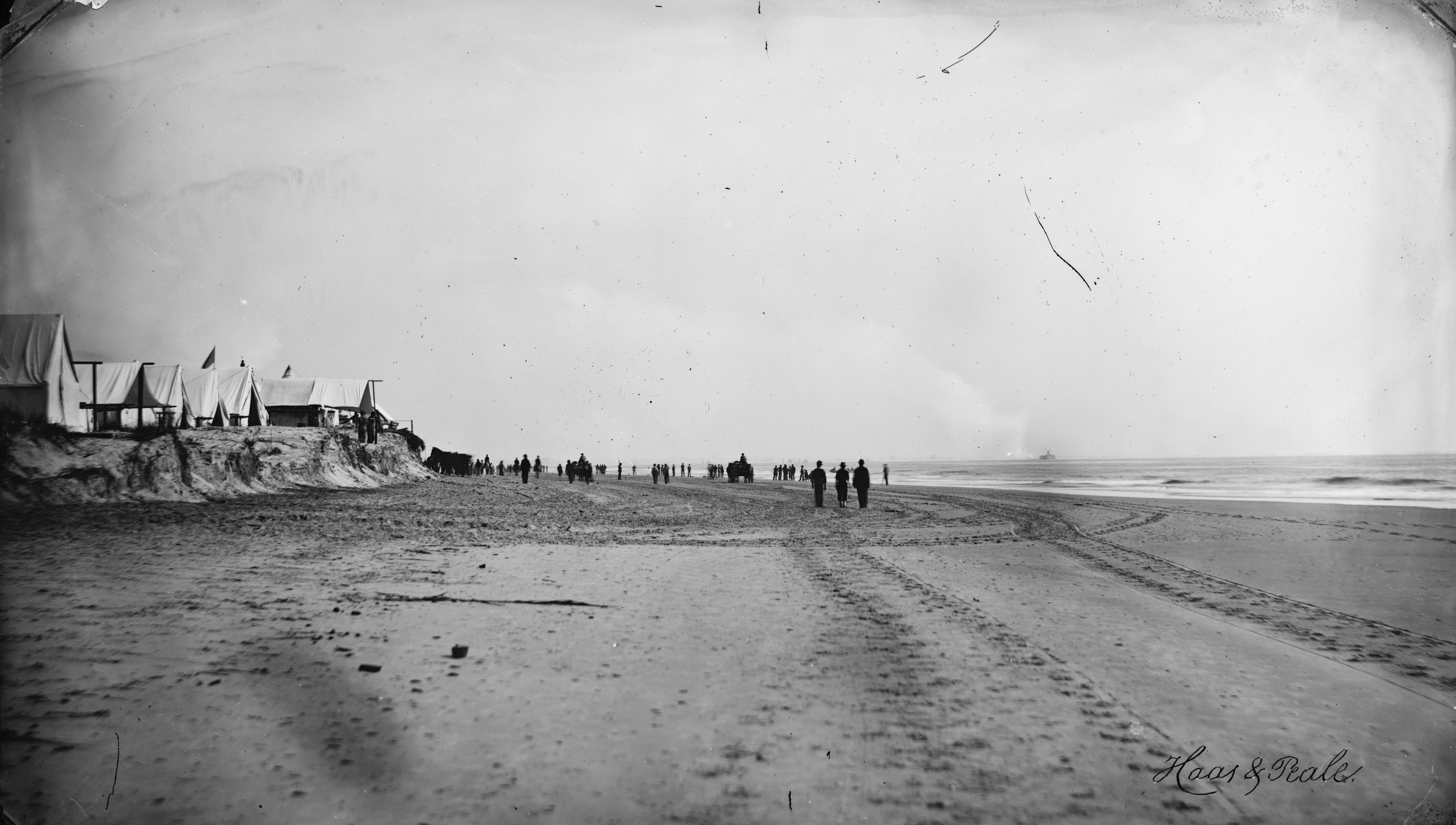
USS New Ironsides and five monitor-class warships engaging Forts Wagner and Gregg in Charleston harbor, S.C., in what is one of the world's first combat action photographs, taken September 5 or 6, 1863 by Haas & Peale

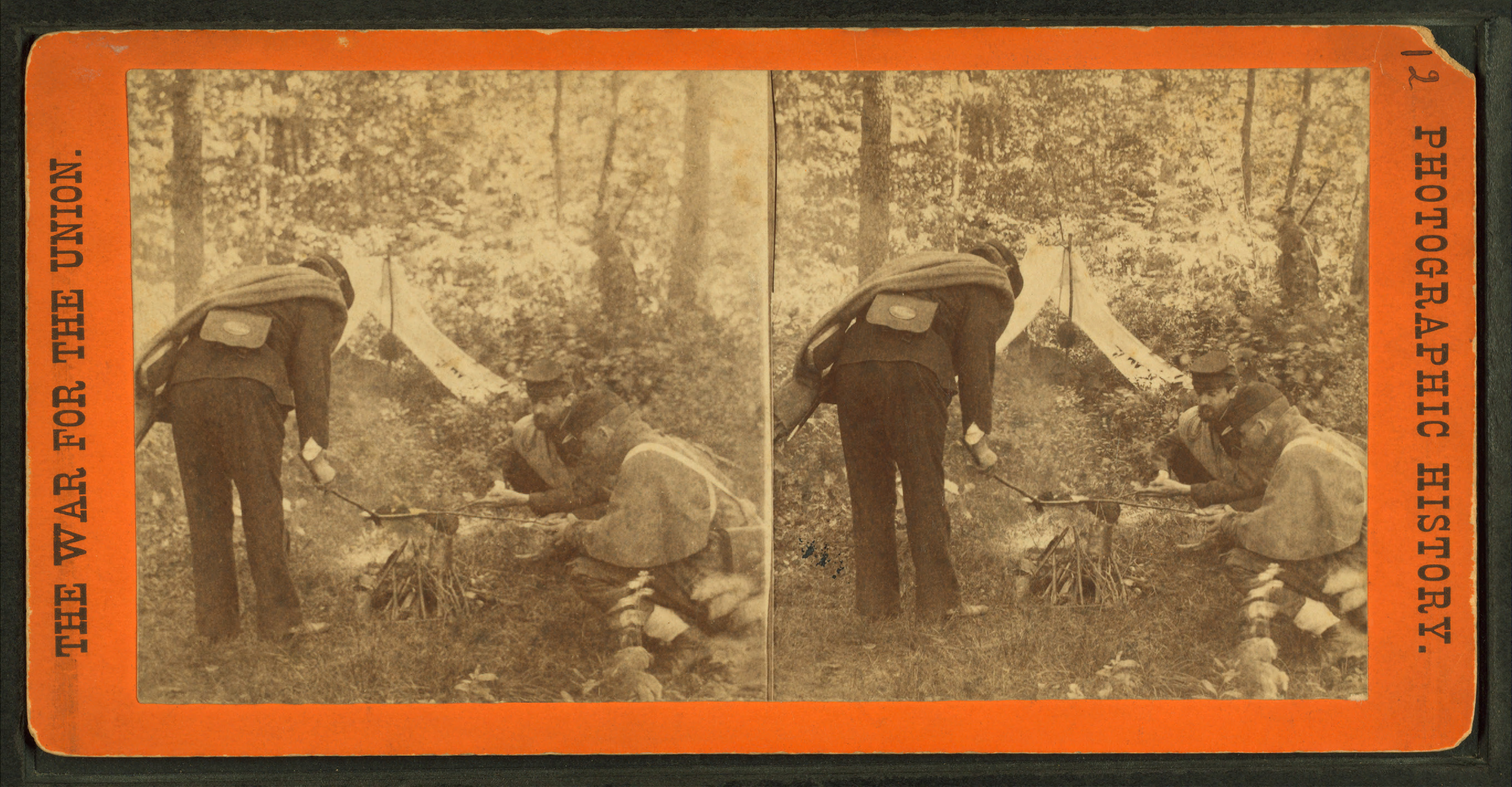
Post civil war picture alleging "Pickets cooking their rations. Reserve picket fort near Fredericksburg, December 9, 1862"

== Northern photographers ==
=== Mathew B. Brady ===
Mathew Brady taken shortly after the First Battle of Bull Run, wearing a sword given to him for defense by a soldier of the New York Fire Zouaves

Mathew B. Brady (May 18, 1822(?) – January 15, 1896), the son of Irish immigrants, was born in Warren County, New York. Brady would spend his fortune to accumulate photos of the war. In the early 1840s, Brady was a manufacturer of "jewel cases" for daguerreotypes in New York City. By 1844 he had opened his own daguerreian gallery at 205 Broadway, the "New-York Daguerreian Miniature Gallery", having with Edward Anthony in 1840 received instruction from Prof. Samuel B. Morse for a fee of $50. Still in his 20s, Brady's next goal was to establish at his hall of fame, a Gallery of Illustrious Americans. "From the first, I regarded myself as under obligation to my country to preserve the faces of its historic men and mothers." Brady returned to New York in May 1852 after a long absence in Europe. While there he sought treatments for an undisclosed illness (mercury poisoning?). In 1856, seeing the tremendous potential for reproducible, enlarged prints and their purpose for the illustrated newspapers, Brady hired photographer and businessman, Alexander Gardner for his Washington City studio.

Mathew Brady's fame derived in part from his self-promotion and his ambition to establish himself as the foremost portrait photographer of his day. He would also become known as the most prominent photographer of the American Civil War. From early on, Brady determined to accumulate as many war views as possible, with the understanding that in the not too distant future a photomechanical means of reproduction would be possible. With this end in mind, he made, exchanged, borrowed and copied prints and negatives, and acquired duplicate views when available. In light of Brady's practice, it is not surprising therefore, that a very large number of war views in his vast collection, that were actually taken by other photographers, came to be associated with his name.

At the beginning of the war, Mathew Brady secured the necessary permissions, purchased rugged cameras and traveling "darkrooms", and sent his employees out to begin documenting the struggle, all at his own personal expense. The First Battle of Bull Run provided the initial opportunity to photograph an engagement between opposing armies, however Brady returned with no known photographs from the battlefield. Following the Federal rout, he arrived back in Washington, D.C., the day after the battle and was photographed at his studio wearing a soiled duster and sword (see photo). Tantalizingly little is known about Brady's life, as he kept no journals, wrote no memoirs and left but few written accounts.

By war's end, Brady estimated he had spent $100,000 to amass more than 10,000 negatives that the public no longer showed an interest in. In 1875, the War Department came to Brady's relief and purchased for $25,000 the remainder of Brady's collection. Anthony Company possessed another immense collection of Brady cartes-de-visite and war negatives, received by them as compensation for Brady's continued indebtedness. From the War Department, the collection devolved to the U.S. Signal Corps, and in 1940 it was accessioned by the National Archives. On January 15, 1896, Brady died penniless in the charity ward of Presbyterian Hospital in New York City. However, in his last days, Brady did not die in isolation. He was visited and comforted often, by friends and admirers up until the very end. His funeral was largely financed by the friends of his adopted regiment, the 7th NYSM.

While it is true that in the beginning, at his own expense, the enterprising Mathew Brady secured the necessary permissions from the War Department for the purpose of documenting the "rebellion", it would largely be others, particularly those photographers who were under the direct supervision of Alexander Gardner, who would follow the armies and ultimately fulfill the difficult task of recording for posterity a timely, consecutive photographic history of the American Civil War.

=== Alexander Gardner ===
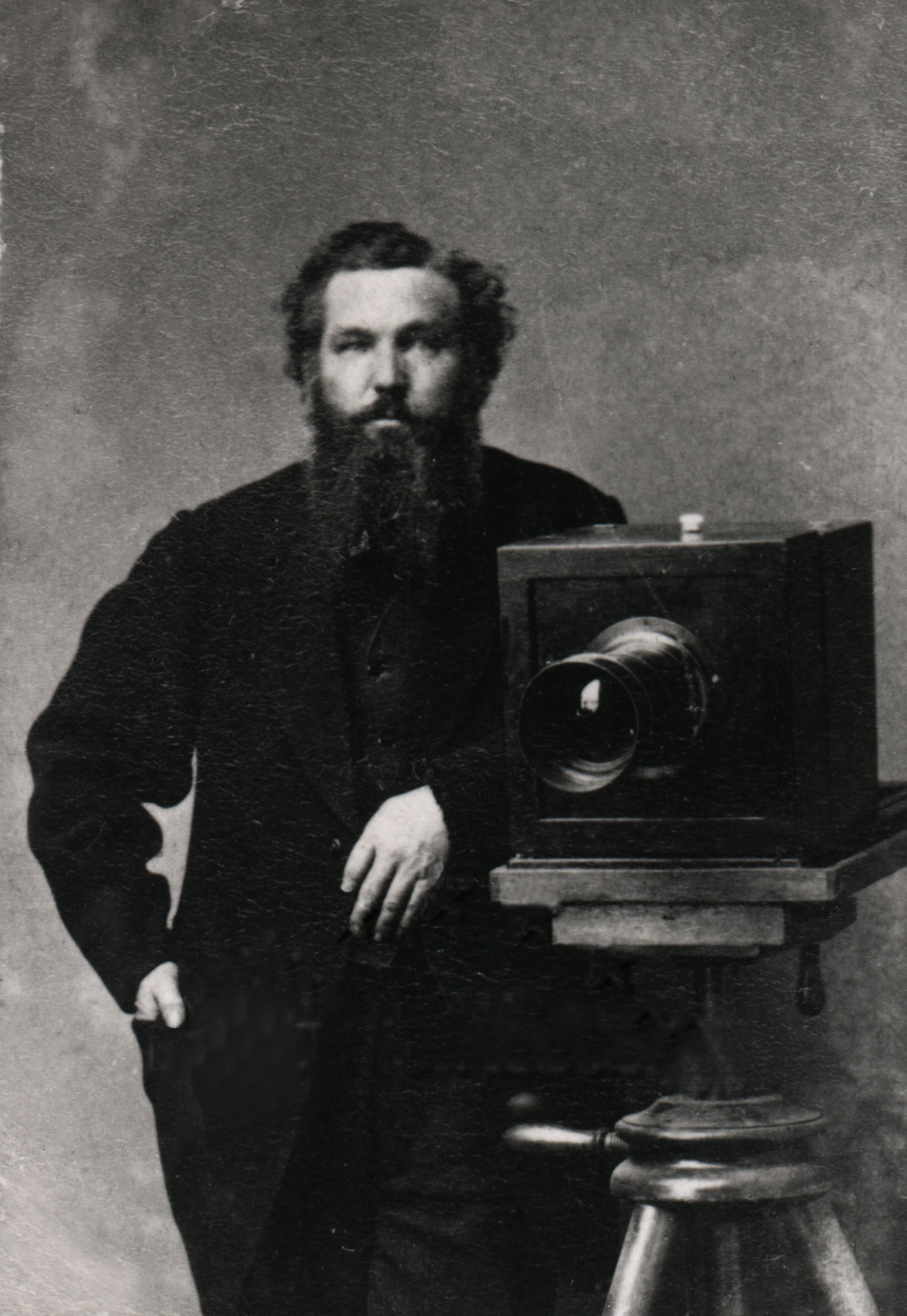
Alexander Gardner, 1856 self-portrait

Alexander Gardner (1821–1882) was born in Paisley, Scotland. He became an apprentice silversmith jeweller at the age of fourteen. Soon, Gardner found out that his interests and talents lay in finance and journalism. When he was twenty-one he left the jeweler's shop for a job on the Glasgow Sentinel as a reporter. After only a year of reporting he was appointed editor of the Sentinel. A love of chemistry soon led him to experiment with photography. Deeply disturbed by the exploitation of the working class, and in the spirit of the early cooperative movements in Scotland, Gardner organized a utopian venture in the US called the "Clydesdale Joint Stock Agricultural and Commercial Company" in Iowa, however by 1853 many at the Iowa colony were sick and dying of tuberculosis (then called "consumption") and the Clydesdale company was dissolved. In 1856, Alex, his brother James and seven others, including Alex's wife, Margaret (1824–?), his son Lawrence (1848–?), his daughter Eliza (1850–?) and his mother Jane, immigrated to the United States. Colleague James Gibson may have been one of the party. Alex sought out the renown Mathew Brady for employment, who hired him to manage the Washington City studio. Gardner's business acumen and expertise at wet-plate photography and particularly the "Imperial Print", a 17 by 21 in (430 by 530 mm) enlargement, brought Brady enormous success. With some reluctance, Brady agreed to let Gardner negotiate with Anthony Co. publishing of the increasingly popular 2 by 3.5 in (51 by 89 mm) "carte-de-visite", or visiting card.

In the fall of 1861, Gardner took a position as official photographer on the staff of General George B. McClellan, the commander of the Army of the Potomac, and was given the honorary rank of captain. This particular assignment lasted until McClellan's demotion in November 1862; however, the title "Photographer to the Army of the Potomac" was used by him to the end of the war. In the year 1862, Gardner and his operators photographed the 1st Bull Run battlefield, McClellan's Peninsula Campaign, and the battlefields of Cedar Mountain and Antietam. Since the battlefields of Fredericksburg and Chancellorsville were Union defeats and remained in enemy hands, Northern photographers were unable to reach the fields.

By May 1863, Gardner had opened his own studio in Washington City with his brother James, taking with him many of Mathew Brady's former staff. Circumstantial evidence suggests that Gardner's split with Brady was not caused by any altruistic concerns over the proper citation in published works. Gardner himself in 1867 acknowledged in a deposition that though a photograph be identified on the mount as a "Photograph by A. Gardner" for example, it simply meant that it was printed or copied in his gallery, and he was not necessarily the photographer. The split seems more likely to have grown out of Brady's incompetent business practices and his failure to regularly meet his payroll.

In July 1863, Gardner and employees James Gibson and Timothy O'Sullivan photographed the fresh battlefield of Gettysburg, Pennsylvania. Grant's Overland Campaign and Petersburg operations were mostly photographed by Gardner's employee Timothy O'Sullivan, "supervisor of my map and field work." By June 1864, the designation of official photographer for Grant's headquarters command had devolved to Mathew Brady.

In April 1865, Gardner photographed Lewis Powell, George Atzerodt, David Herold, Michael O'Laughlen, Edman Spangler and Samuel Arnold, who were arrested for conspiring to assassinate President Abraham Lincoln. Gardner, with the assistance of O'Sullivan, also took photographs of the execution of Mary Surratt, Lewis Powell, George Atzerodt and David Herold as they were hanged at Washington Penitentiary on July 7, 1865. Four months later, Gardner photographed the execution of Henry Wirz, commanding officer at the infamous prisoner of war camp in Andersonville, Georgia.

In 1865 and 1866, "Lincoln's favorite photographer" published his two-volume anthology, Gardner's Photographic Sketch Book of the War. The two editions consisted of two leather-bound volumes each. Both volumes contained 50 tipped-in, imperial size albumen prints each, with accompanying pages of descriptive, letterpress. At $150 per set however, it was not the success Gardner had hoped. When asked about his work he said, "It is designed to speak for itself . . As mementos of the fearful struggle through which the country has just passed, it is confidently hoped that it will possess an enduring interest."

In September 1867 Gardner closed his gallery, and with his son Lawrence and assistant William R. Pywell set out to photograph along the proposed route of the U.P.R.R., taking photographs along the 35th parallel, from Wyandotte to Hays Kansas. After finishing his assignment on October 19, Gardner returned to Washington City and that year published his folio sized anthology, "Across the Continent on the Union Pacific Railway, Eastern Division."

In 1875, the civic-minded Gardner worked at the Washington City Metropolitan Police Department, copying nearly a thousand daguerreotypes to be used as "mug shots", the forerunner of the "Rogues Gallery." In 1879, Alexander Gardner formally retired from photography, devoting his remaining years to improving and enlarging the scope of the co-operative life insurance business model of the "Washington Beneficial Endowment Association." Gardner continued with his involvement in the "Masonic Mutual Relief Association", becoming its president in 1882, and the St Andrews Society, a Scottish relief organization.

=== George N. Barnard ===
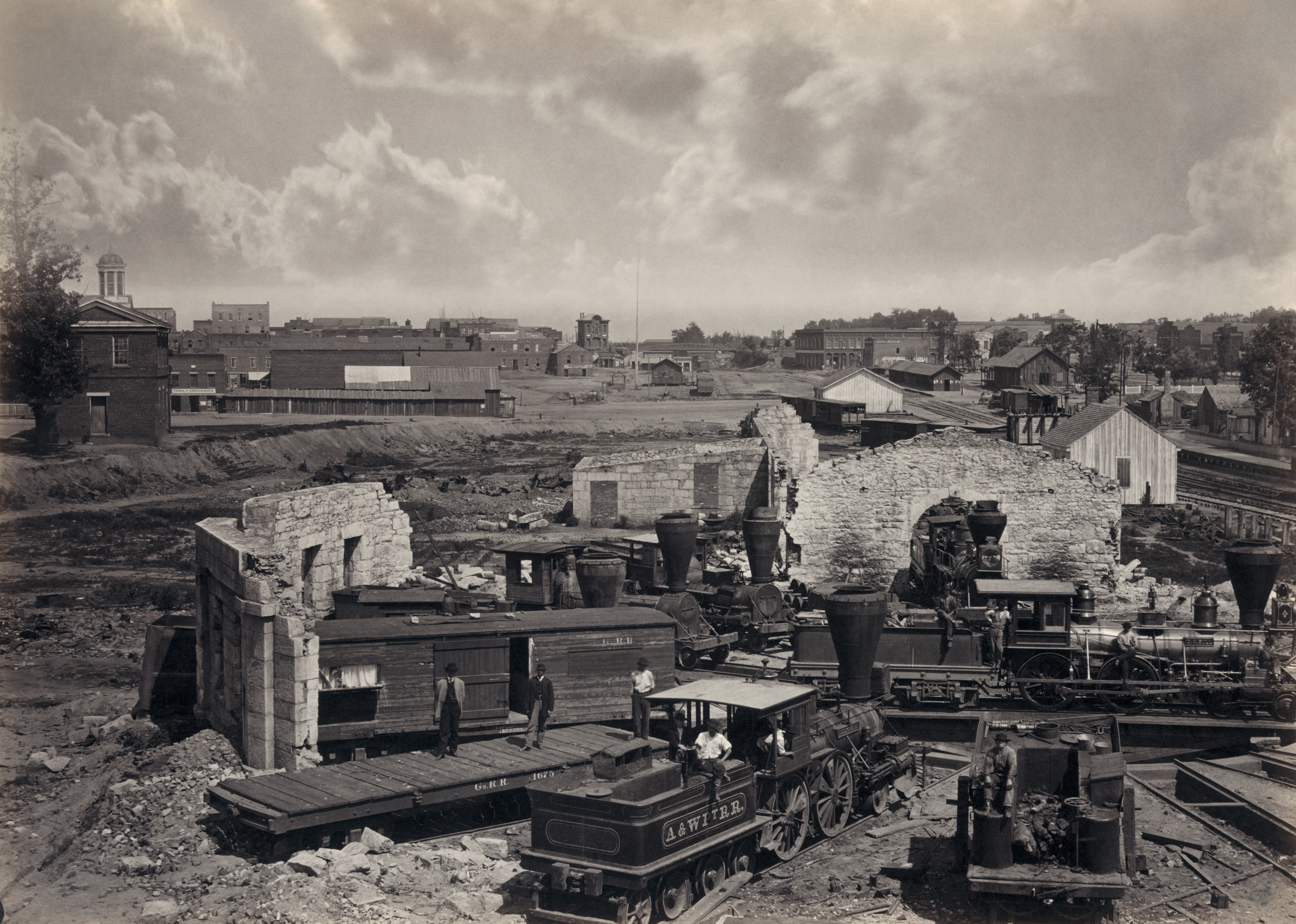
Ruined roundhouse in Atlanta, Georgia, after the Atlanta campaign. Albumen print by George Barnard, 1866. Digitally restored. A distinctive attribute of Barnard's work was to superimpose clouds into an otherwise overexposed sky.

George Norman Barnard (1819–1902) was born in Coventry, Connecticut, and as a child moved to upstate New York. After a brief career in hotel management, he opened a daguerreotype studio in Oswego, New York, becoming nationally known for his portraits. It is not known where Barnard learned his trade. On July 5, 1853, Barnard photographed the conflagration at the Ames flour mills in Oswego, producing what may be the first American "news" photograph. In 1854 he moved his operation to Syracuse, New York, and began using the wet-plate collodion process. In 1859, Barnard joined Edward Anthony's firm. At the outbreak of war, Barnard was working for Mathew Brady in Washington, D.C., and New York City. Barnard, besides doing portraits and photographing the troops around Washington, D.C., was among Brady's initial corps of photographers, who were sent into the field to photograph the battlefields of Northern Virginia, and the Peninsula, including Bull Run and Yorktown, as well as Harper's Ferry. Barnard is best known for his 1866 masterpiece, Photographic Views of Sherman's Campaign, which contains 61 Imperial size, albumen prints embracing scenes from the occupation of Nashville, the great battles around Chattanooga and Lookout Mountain, the campaign of Atlanta, the Great March to the Sea, and the Great Raid through the Carolinas. He continued to photograph after the war, operating studios in Charleston, S.C. and Chicago. His Chicago studio was destroyed by the historic fire of 1871. In 1880 Barnard sold his Charleston studio and moved to Rochester, New York. From 1881 to 1883 he was the distinguished spokesman for George Eastman's line gelatine dry plates. Barnard ventured into his own short lived dry plate manufacturing concern with Robert H. Furman in 1882–83. In 1884, the Barnards moved to Painesville, Ohio and opened a studio with partner, local artist Horace Tibbals, which utilized their own manufactured dry plates. In 1888, George closed his business and his family moved to Gadsden, Alabama. In 1892, he moved for the last time to Cedarville, near Syracuse, New York, where he maintained his interest in photography, taking pictures of friends and family, and taking yearly class pictures of the school children. George Barnard died on February 4, 1902, at the home of his daughter, in Onondaga. He was 82. He is buried in Gilbert Cemetery in Marcellus, New York.

=== Timothy H. O'Sullivan ===
Timothy O'Sullivan photographed by Alexander Gardner, c. 1863

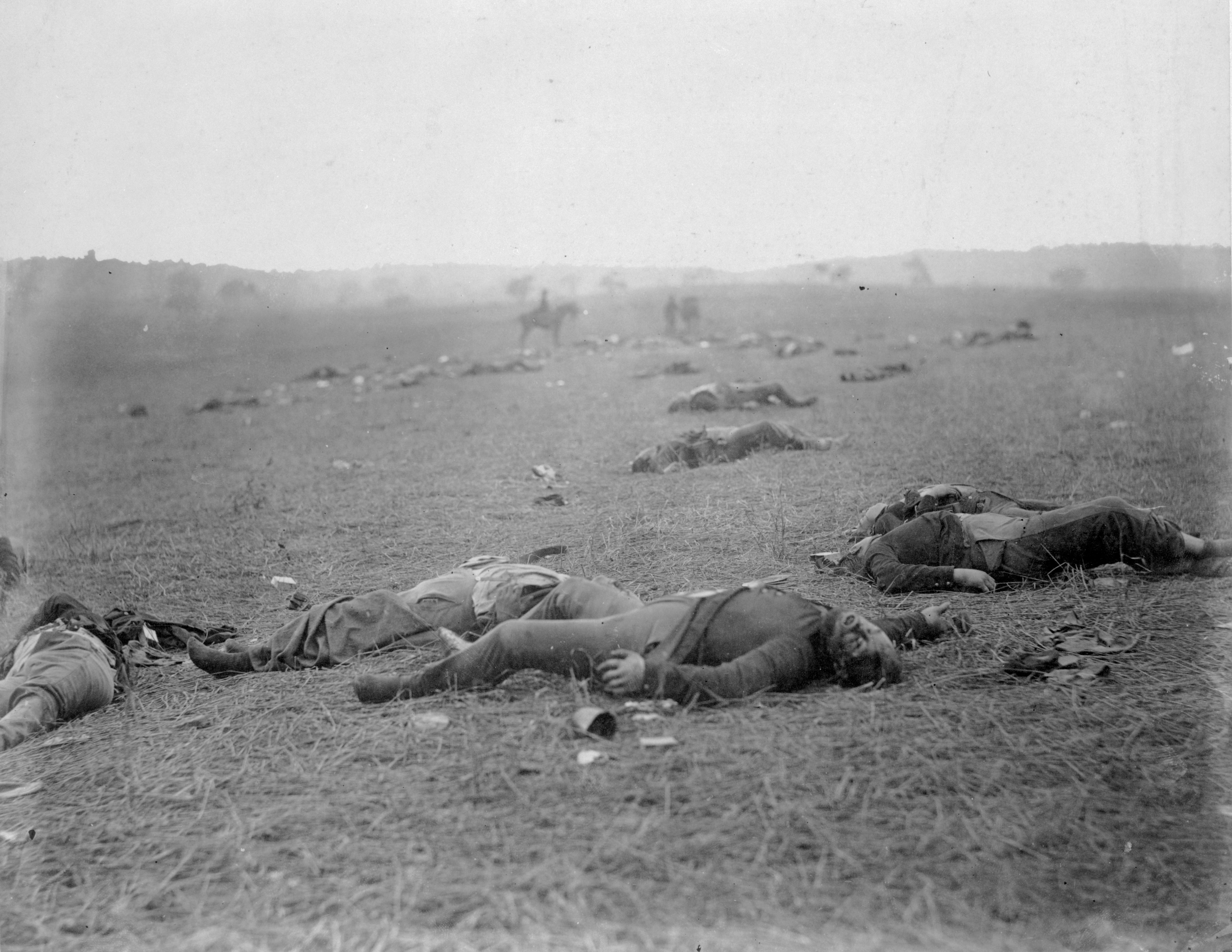
Incidents of the war: "The Harvest of Death", Gettysburg, July, 1863"

Timothy H. O'Sullivan (1840–1882) was born in New York City. As a teenager, he was employed by Mathew Brady and worked for him continuously from 1856 to late 1862, when he was hired by Alexander Gardner as "superintendent of my map and field work." In the winter of 1861–62, O'Sullivan was dispatched to document Gen. Thomas W. Sherman's Port Royal, S.C. operations. In July 1862, O'Sullivan followed the campaign of Gen. John Pope in Virginia. In July 1863, he reached the pinnacle of his career when he took pictures at Gettysburg, PA., most notably, "The Harvest of Death". In 1864, following Gen. Grant's trail, he photographed during the Siege of Petersburg and the siege of Fort Fisher. That brought him to Appomattox Court House in April 1865, and back to Petersburg in May. Fully 45 of the 100 prints in Gardner's Photographic Sketch Book Of The War are credited to O'Sullivan.

At the end of the Civil War, O'Sullivan was made official government photographer for the Clarence King (1867, 68, 69, 72), Isthmus of Darien (Panama 1870) and George Wheeler (1871, 73, 74) Expeditions respectively, during which time he married fellow photographer, William Pywell's sister Laura in 1873. O'Sullivan's pictures were among the first to record the prehistoric ruins, Navajo weavers, and Pueblo villages of the southwest, and were instrumental in attracting settlers to the West. In 1875 O'Sullivan returned to Washington, D.C., where he spent the last years of his short life as the official photographer of the Treasury Department. Just seven years later, at the young age of 42, O'Sullivan died of tuberculosis at his parents' home in Staten Island, New York.

=== James F. Gibson ===
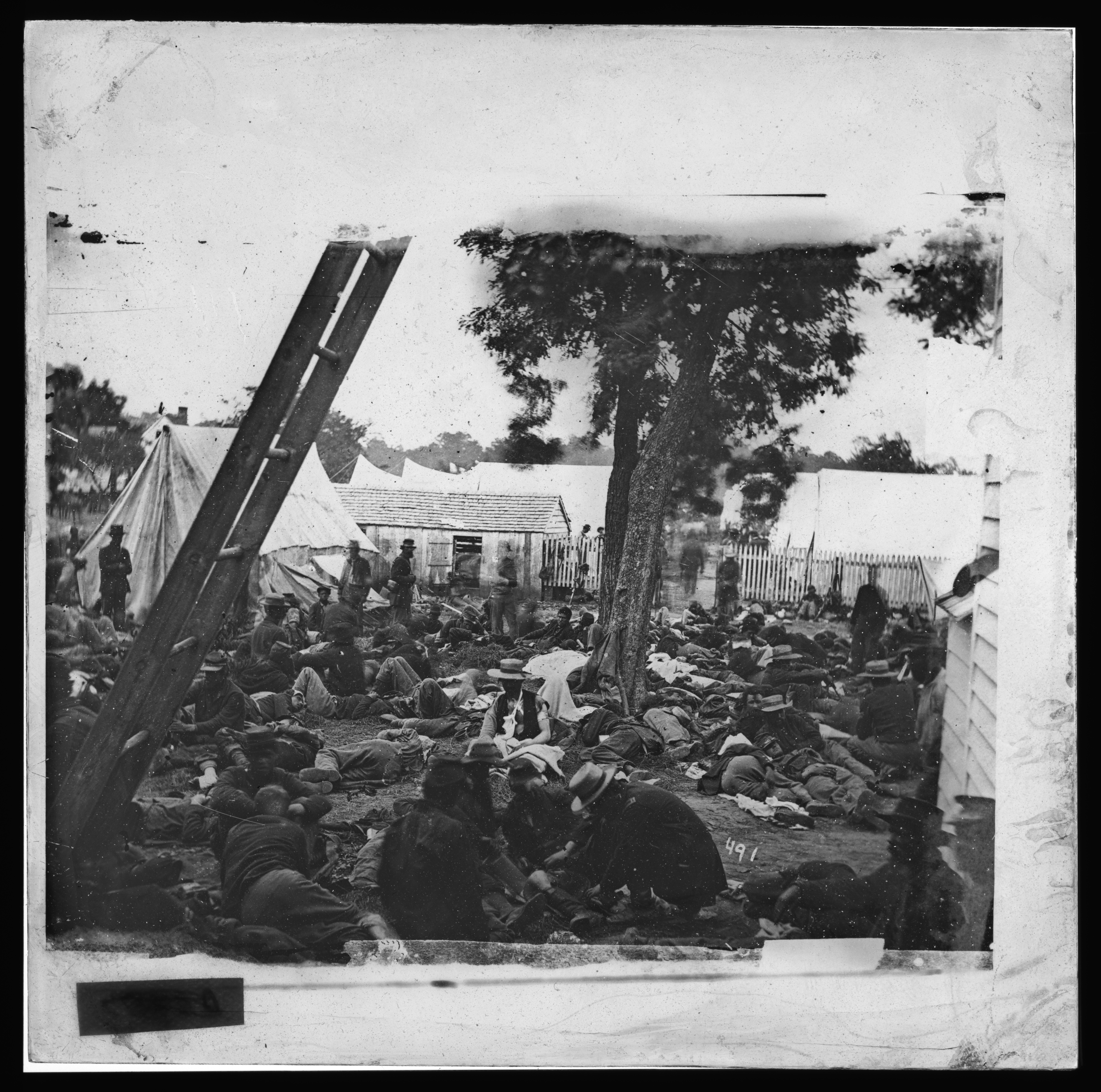
"Savage Station, Virginia Union field hospital after the battle of June 27" – Gibson, June 28, 1862

James Forbes Gibson (1828-1875) is perhaps the least recognized of the war's most significant photographers, despite working closely with Gardner, O'Sullivan, Barnard and Brady. Born in Edinburgh, he was a valet and later steward to Francis Napier, 10th Lord Napier, the minister plenipotentiary to the United States from 1857-1859. In Edinburgh he became friendly with photographer James Good Tunny, and served as a valet to a surgeon in the Crimean War. Gibson partnered with George N. Barnard photographing the city of Washington for Brady's gallery, and later on the Bull Run battlefield in March 1862. He became a talented stereographer and accompanied the Army of the Potomac through the Peninsula campaign. He worked with Gardner at Gettysburg and partnered with him at Sharpsburg, but Gibson's own greatest legacy was the wide array of photographs he took while on the Virginia peninsula, in particular his poignant, landmark photo of the wounded at Savage Station, Virginia. In September 1864 he went into full partnership with Brady, purchasing half the gallery operation for $10,000, with half as a down payment against future receipts. In fact, Brady had severely oversold the value of the operation and Gibson never made enough to pay in full. After a series of court cases the gallery was wound up in 1868. (Gibson also sued Gardner). He returned to Europe with his family for a short while before setting up as a dealer in gentleman's fashion in Kansas City, where he died in 1875.

=== Andrew J. Russell ===
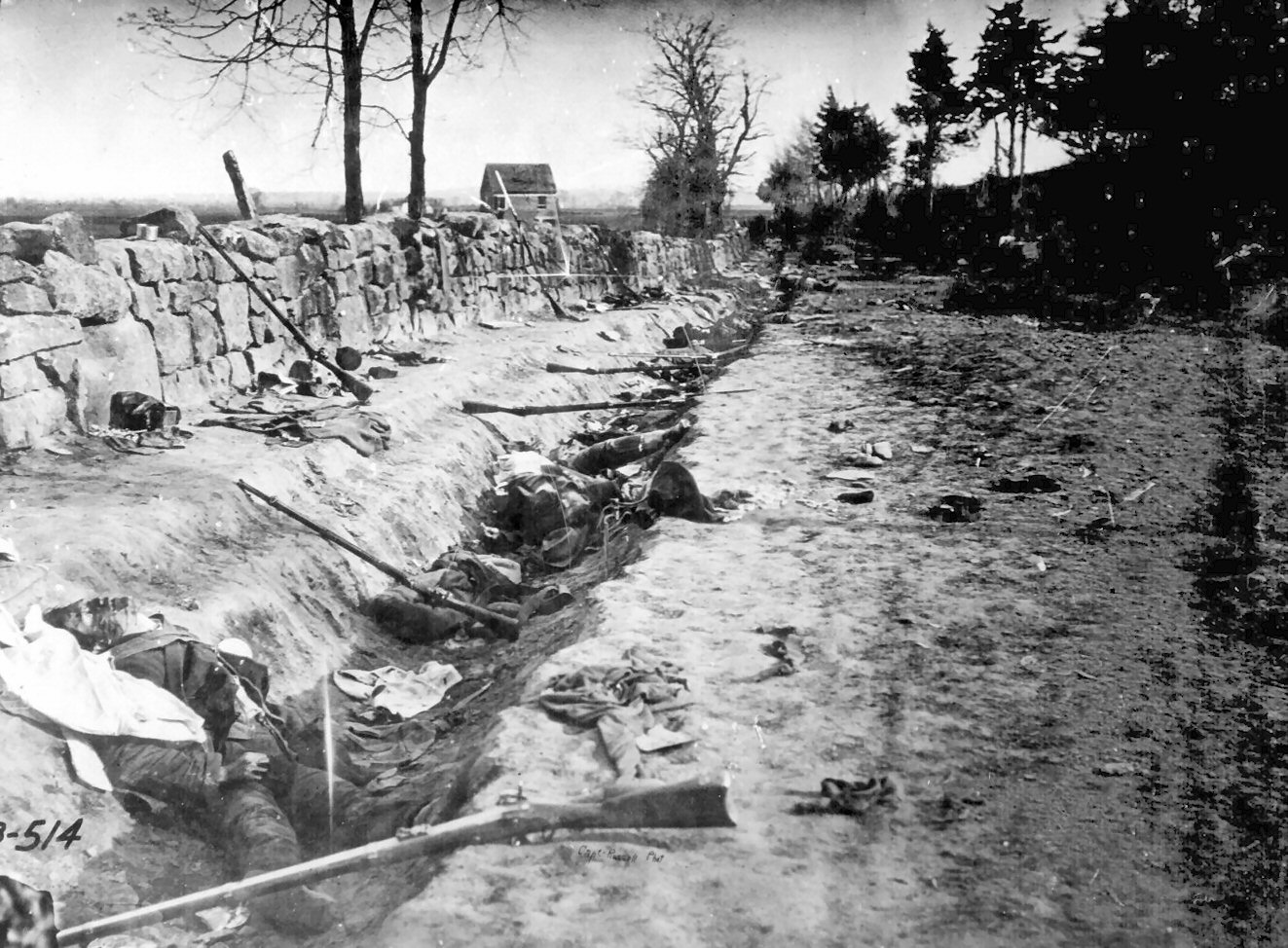
Confederate Dead behind the Stone Wall at Marye's Height's, Fredericksburg VA. May 3, 1863

Andrew J. Russell (1829–1902) was born in Walpole, New Hampshire, the son of Harriet (née Robinson) and Joseph Russell. He was raised in Nunda, New York. He took an early interest in painting, and in addition to executing portraiture for local public figures, he was drawn to railroads and trains. During the first two years of the Civil War, Russell painted a diorama used to recruit soldiers for the Union Army. On 22 August 1862, he volunteered at Elmira, New York, mustering in the following month as a captain in Company F, 141st New York Volunteer Regiment. In February 1863, Russell, who had become interested in the new art of photography, paid free-lance photographer Egbert Guy Fowx $300 to teach him the wet-plate collodion process. Capt. Russell's first photographs were used by Brigadier General Herman Haupt to illustrate his reports. Impressed with his work, on 1 March 1863, Haupt arranged to have Russell detached from his regiment and assigned to the United States Military Railroad Construction Corps, making Russell one of only two, Federal non-civilian Civil War photographers (Pvt. Philip Haas). In his embedded capacity, Russell not only photographed transportation subjects for the War Department, but also likely moonlighted by selling battlefield negatives to the Anthonys. In fact, Russell took over a thousand photos in two and a half years, some of which were distributed exclusively to President Lincoln. He's probably best known for "Stone wall at foot of Marye's Heights, Fredericksburg, Va." showing dead Confederates of Barksdale's brigade, during the battle of Chancellorsville. Andrew Russell died on September 22, 1902, in Brooklyn, New York. He is buried in Cypress Hills Cemetery.

=== Thomas C. Roche ===
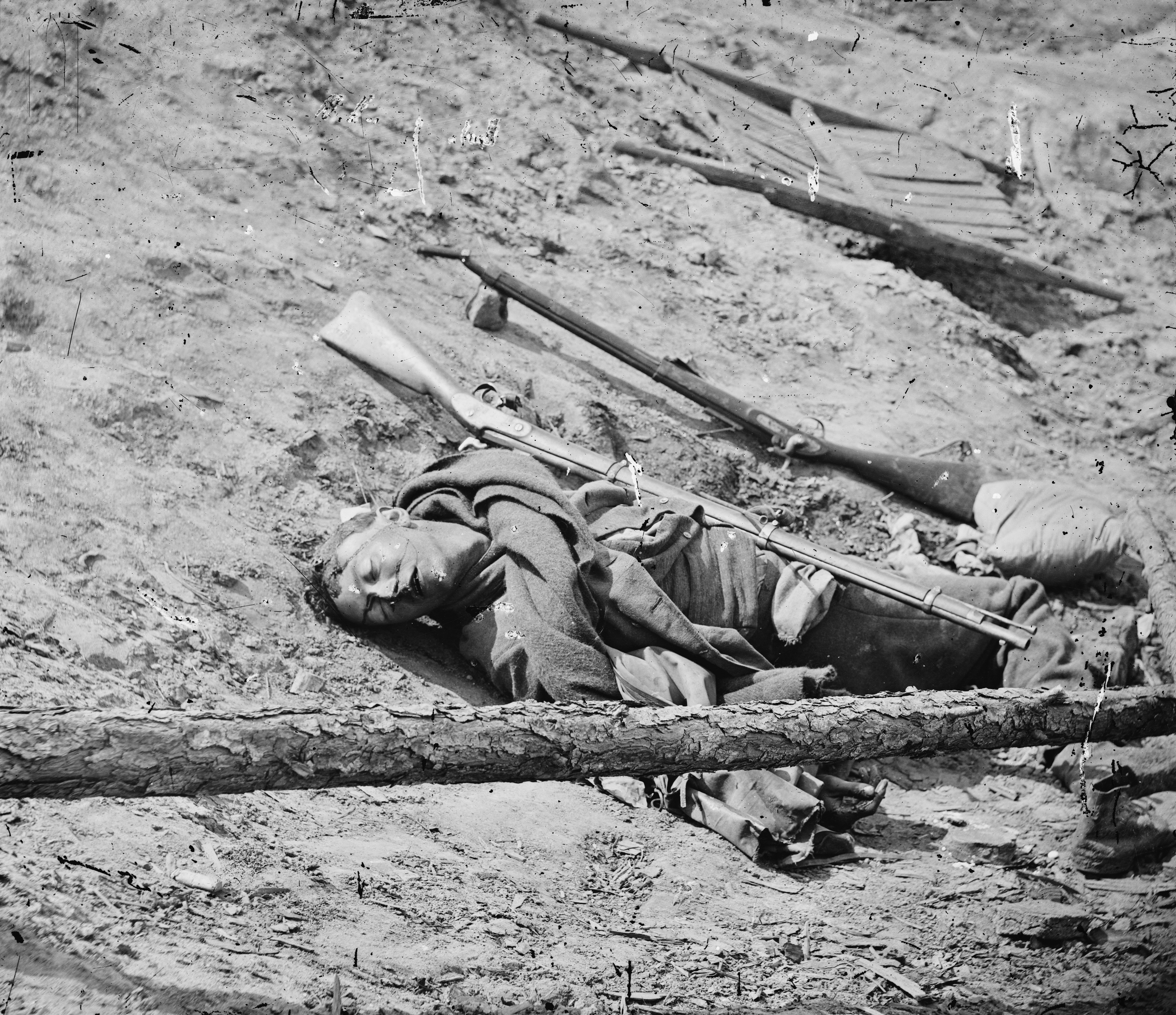
Dead Confederate soldier inside Fort Mahone, Petersburg, Virginia – T. C. Roche, April 3, 1865

In 1858, Thomas C. Roche (1826–1895) became interested in photography and was listed as an agent at 83 South St. in Brooklyn, New York. In 1862 he went to work for Anthony Co., taking the first complete set of Central Park stereoviews published by them. Many early Anthony stereoviews by Roche were published on fragile glass which, not surprisingly, are today extremely rare. Over the years, Roche was Anthony Co.'s principal photographer and senior advisor and one of their most valuable assets, developing many patents for the company's products and processes. Arguably, Roche's most important patent (241,070) was taken out in 1881 for a silver bromide-sensitized gelatin, "dry plate." Roche's process would signal the end of "wet plate" photography. Roche lived well off his many royalties, and continued as technical advisor to the company, sharing his knowledge, wisdom and anecdotes with readers of Anthony's Bulletin up until his death in 1895. Roche is probably best known for, and counts among his many accomplishments, the roughly 50 stereoviews taken on April 3, 1865, following the fall of Petersburg, Virginia. These include the "death studies", at least 20 stereoviews of the dead, allegedly taken inside Fort Mahone The War Department contracts guaranteed the Anthonys the stereo negatives, while furnishing the government with the large format plates.

=== Jacob F. Coonley ===
Spectators watching the fight between Hood and Thomas at Nashville, Tennessee, Dec. 15, 1864 – Jay Coonley

New York Ambrotypist Jacob Frank "Jay" Coonley (1832–1915) was originally a landscape painter who learned the photographic trade from George N. Barnard. He managed Edward Anthony's stereoscopic print shop until 1862, taking assignments in Pennsylvania, New York and Washington, D.C. When war erupted, Coonley remained in Washington, photographing generals soldiers, statesman and the like. In 1862 he briefly moved to Philadelphia to open the portrait gallery partnership of Coonley & Wolfsberger. Six month later, Coonley was back in New York managing Clarke's Union Gallery, corner of Broadway and Bleecker St. In 1864, he was awarded a contract by Quartermaster General Montgomery Meigs, for photographic work along the lines of the railroads in US. possession, in Alabama, Georgia and Tennessee. During this time, Coonley also produced the Nashville series for Edward Anthony. Coonley was also likely responsible for at least fourteen photos archived at the Library of Congress, depicting the April 14, 1865, Fort Sumter Flag-Raising Ceremony, though he is cited as the author of only one. The photographic evidence suggests the Anthony Co. photographer used a stereo camera with a drop-shutter, utilizing two camera locations inside the fort. The only view inside Fort Sumter that actually depicts the garrison flag being raised is the work of photographer William E. James. From 1865 to 1871 Coonley managed C. J. Quinby's Charleston gallery, with George N. Barnard joining as a partner in 1868. Coonley is known to have operated a business at 78 Broughton Street, Savannah, Georgia, dealing in Chromos, engravings and paintings, as well as manufacturing frames and publishing of stereoviews and photographs. Some years later, Cooley spent time in Nassau, Bahamas, at the request of Governor-General, Sir William Robinson. He returned to New York in 1881 and took a position as operator for J. M. Mora. In 1886 Coonley returned to Nassau, establishing a successful business there until 1904, when he sold out and returned to New York. Seventy-two year old Coonley would continue to spend his winters in the Bahamas. A December 1915 article on his death published in the New York Evening World stated that Coonley, who had been an invalid for some time, died after attempting suicide.

=== Sam A. Cooley ===
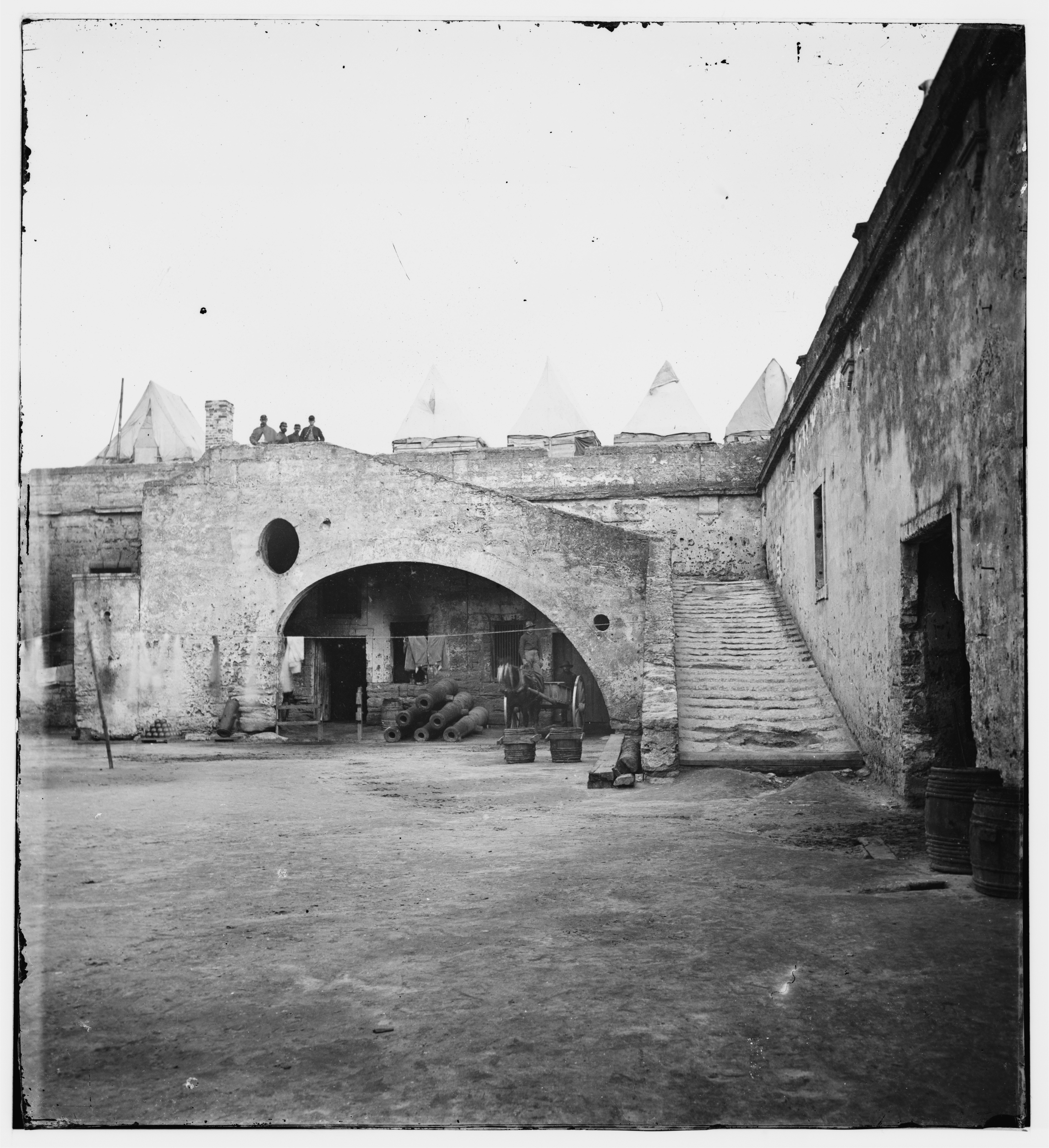
Interior, Fort Marion, St. Augustine, Florida – Sam Cooley, 1864

Samuel Abbot Cooley (1821–1900), from Connecticut, surfaced in the Beaufort area before the war as a photographer. He stayed in the occupied area as a sutler and photographer for X Corps, employing his large format, drop-shutter and twin lens stereo cameras. By 1863 Cooley had a photographic studio above his store located next door to the Arsenal. He sold his photographic business in May 1864 with the intent of returning to the North. He reappeared in Beaufort in 1865, where he opened a mercantile and simultaneously advertised himself as "Photographer, Department of the South", doing contract work for the government. Cooley advertised in the local paper an inventory of over two thousand different negatives, views taken from Charleston, South Carolina, to St. Augustine, Florida, which included card, stereoscopic and large 11X14 views taken for the government. Cooley also opened galleries in Hilton Head, South Carolina, and Jacksonville, Florida. In 1866 he had also established himself as an auctioneer and a town marshal, with his office at the Beaufort Hotel in Beaufort. His account book indicates he sold bread and foodstuffs to various businesses as well as to the General Hospital and the Small Pox Hospital. He eventually returned home to Hartford, Connecticut, in 1869, where he offered at his gallery, an "exhibition of beautiful Stereopticon Views." Sam passed on 15 May 1900 (age 78) and is buried at Old North Cemetery, Hartford, Connecticut.

=== John Reekie ===
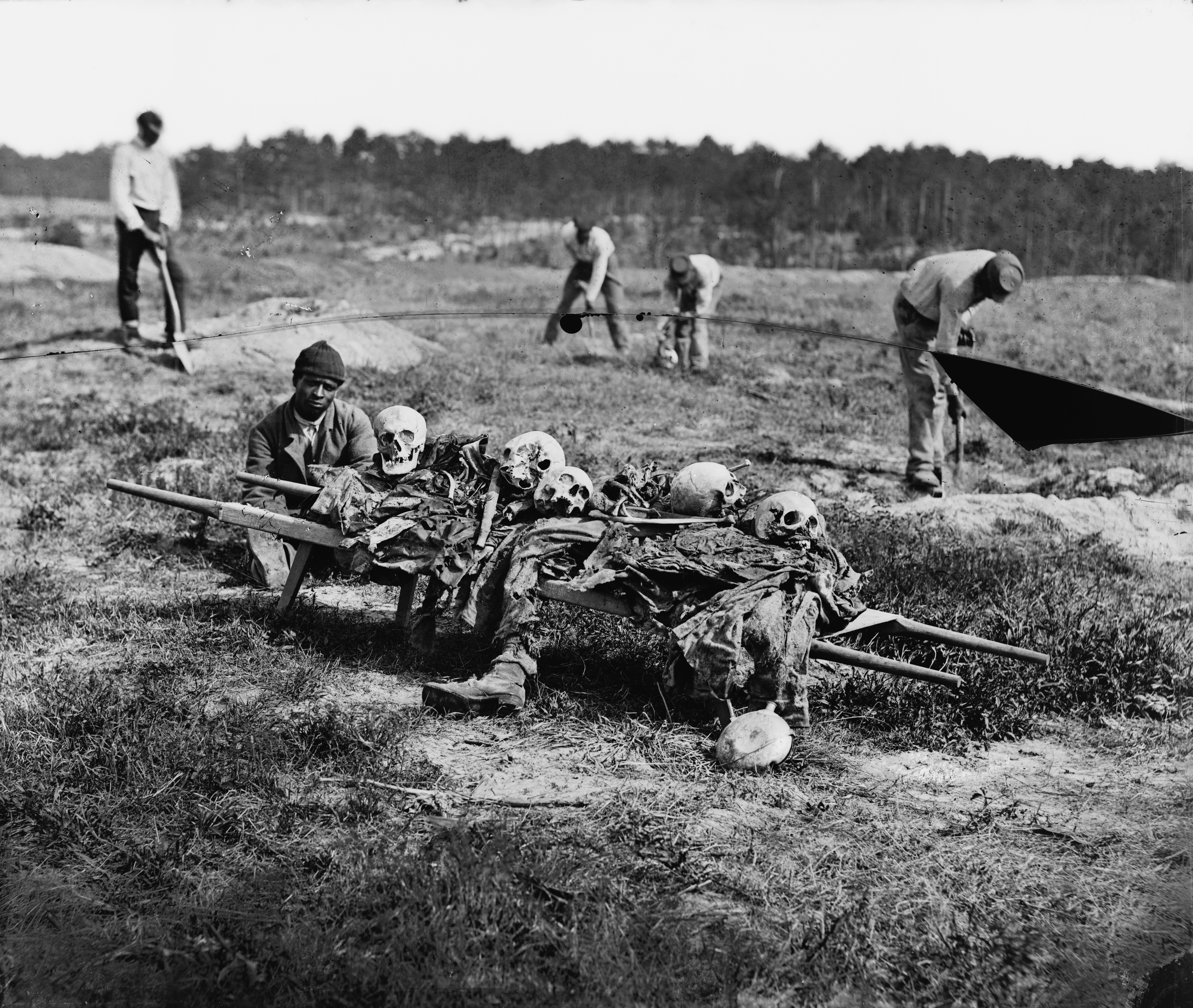
"African Americans collecting bones of soldiers killed at Cold Harbor (by John Reekie; issued as Stereo #918, April 1865)

John Reekie (1829–1885) was another little known Civil War photographer. A Scotsman, Reekie was employed by Alexander Gardner. Reekie was active in Virginia, taking views at Dutch Gap and City Point, and in and around Petersburg, Mechanicsville and Richmond. Reekie's probably best known for his scenes of the unburied dead, on the battlefields of Gaines' Mill and Cold Harbor. One of his most well-known, "A Burial Party, Cold Harbor," was included with six others of his negatives in Gardner's Photographic Sketch Book of the War. It depicts African American soldiers gathering human remains on the Cold Harbor battlefield, almost a year after the battle. This photograph is notable for being one of relatively few images depicting black soldiers at work in the war.
John Reekie was an officer of the Saint Andrews Society, a Scottish relief organization in Washington, D.C., as was Alexander and James Gardner and David Knox. Reekie died on April 6, 1885, of pneumonia and was buried in Glenwood Cemetery (Washington, D.C.).

=== David B. Woodbury ===
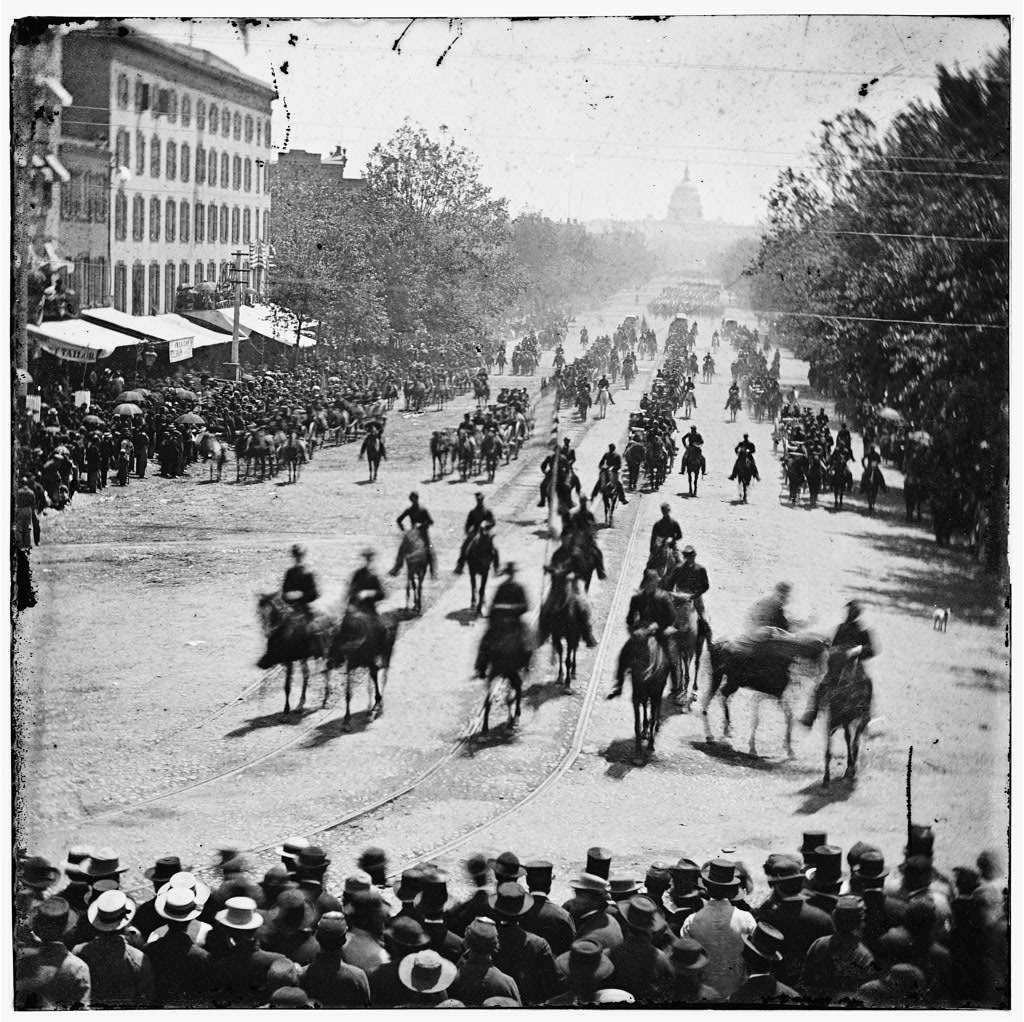
Grandreview of the Union Army. Pennsylvania Avenue Washington, D.C. May 1865

David B. Woodbury (1839–1879) was arguably the best of the artists who stayed with Brady through the war. In March 1862, Mathew Brady sent Woodbury and Edward Whitney out to photograph the 1st Bull Run battlefield, and in May, views of the Peninsula Campaign. In July 1863, Woodbury and Anthony Berger photographed the Gettysburg battlefield for Brady, returning on November 19 to take "pictures of the crowd and Procession" (Nov. 23, 1863 letter to sister Eliza). In the summer of 1864, Woodbury photographed Grant's Headquarters Command for Brady, who had replaced Alexander Gardner as official photographer. On April 24, Woodbury assisted J.F. Coonley on the steps the Treasury Building, for the purpose of photographing the Grand Review of the Army, "the plates being exposed with a drop shutter, this being the nearest thing to an instantaneous exposure with a wet plate." David B. Woodbury died December 30, 1866, in Gibraltar, where he had traveled, seeking a milder climate for his declining health caused by consumption.

=== David Knox ===
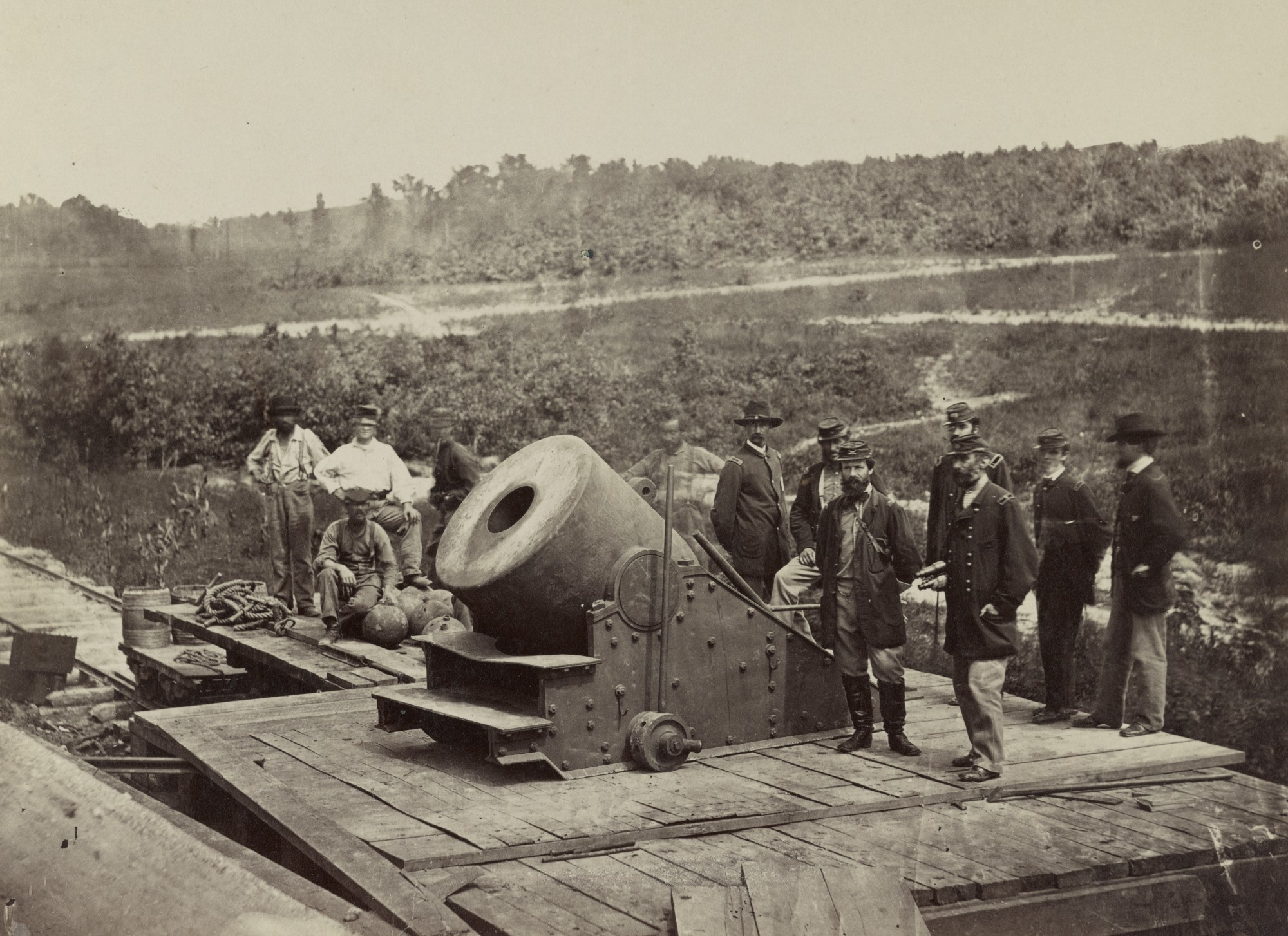
"13 inch mortar Dictator in front of Petersburg, Va" – David Knox, September 1, 1864

David Knox (1821–1895) was born in Renfrew, Scotland. In 1849, with wife Jane older brother John and John's wife Elizabeth, machinist Knox emigrated to America, taking a machinist job in New Haven, Connecticut. Knox became a naturalized citizen on March 22, 1855, just five years after the tragic deaths of 28 year-old Jane and his 7-week-old son David. In 1856, David moved to Springfield, Ill., taking a job as a machinist for the Great Western Railroad. His home was just one block from the residence of Abraham Lincoln. Soon after, Knox relocated his family to Washington, D.C. The first reference to Knox working at the Mathew B. Brady studio is a September 21, 1862, telegram sent from the Antietam battlefield by Alexander Gardner, addressed to "David Knox Brady Gallery", Washington. Knox was likely trained there by Gardner in the use of a large format camera. Historians don't know exactly when Knox left Brady's employ to Join Alexander Gardner's new competing firm. Returns for the June–July 1863 Draft Registration show Knox as a 42-year-old photographer, very near Gardner's gallery. Four of Knox's wartime negatives were included in "Gardner's Photographic Sketch Book of the War."[49] He is probably best known for his iconic plate, "13 inch mortar Dictator, in front of Petersburg, Va." Like his colleagues John Reekie and the Gardner brothers, Knox was an officer of the Washington, D.C., Saint Andrews Society, a Scottish relief organization.[50] On May 7–10, 1868 the Crow, Northern Cheyenne and Northern Arapaho, signed treaties at Fort Laramie, Dakota Territory which were attested to by "Alex. Gardner" and "David Knox" establishing that Knox was engaged there in picture taking with Gardner. In 1870 David Knox and his wife Marion moved to Omaha, Nebraska, where he had apparently finished with photography to pursue regular employment as a machinist. He became head of the Union Pacific Railroad machinist shops. David died on November 24, 1895, and is buried with Marion at Forest Lawn Memorial Park, in Omaha, Nebraska.

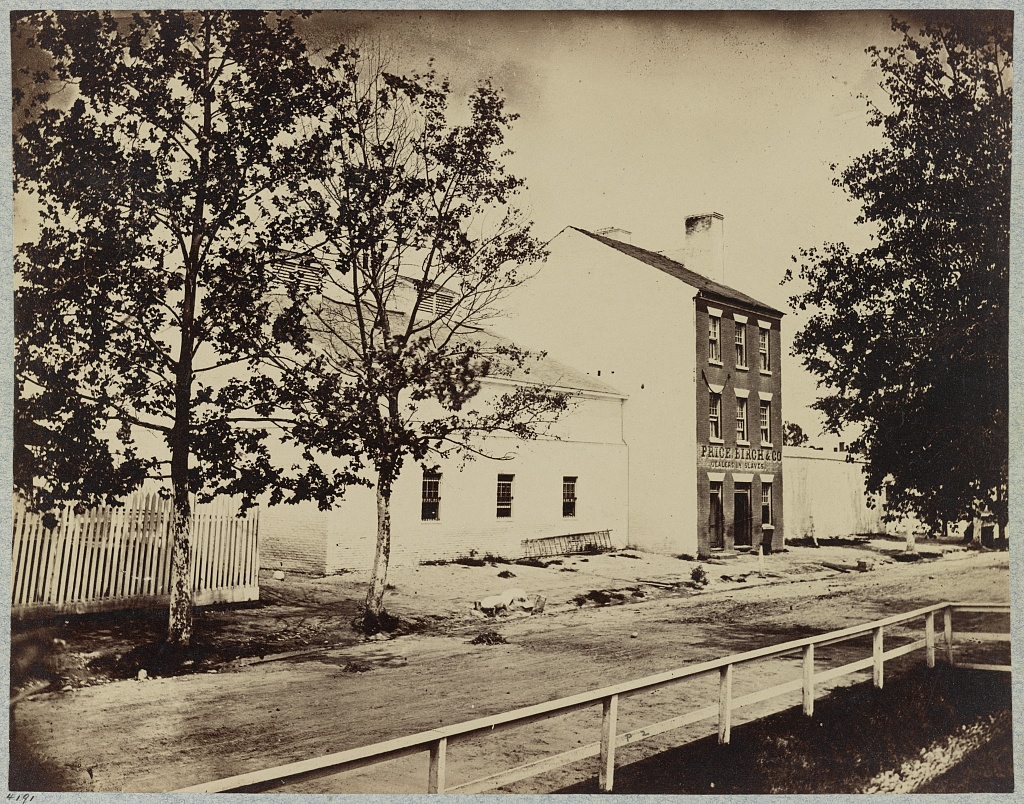
Slave pen buildings of Price, Birch & Co. 1315 Duke Street, Alexandria, Va., used to hold slaves awaiting auction – William Pywell, 1862

=== William R. Pywell ===
William Redish Pywell (1843–1887) worked for both Mathew Brady and Alexander Gardner. Pywell's photographs are an important and integral part of the historic photographic record of the American Civil War. Three fine negatives are credited to Pywell in Gardner's Photographic Sketch Book of the War. Pywell was busy in both the Western Theatre as well as in the East, but is probably best remembered for his early photographs of the slave pens of Alexandria, Va. Between September and October 1867, Pywell assisted Alexander Gardner during the "Kansas Pacific Railway Survey" across the 39th parallel, from Wyandotte, Kansas to Fort Wallace in western Kansas. The result would be Gardner's folio sized album Across the Continent on the Union Pacific Railway, Eastern Division. Six years later, he was the official photographer of the 1873 Yellowstone Expedition to survey a route for the Northern Pacific Railroad along the Yellowstone River, under the overall command of Colonel David S. Stanley, with Lieutenant Colonel George A. Custer as second in command.

=== William F. Browne ===
Detail, Confederate battery on James River at Dutch Gap, Va. – William F. Browne, 1865

William Frank Browne (?–1867) was born in Northfield, Vermont. At the outset of war, Browne enlisted in Company C of the 15th Vermont Infantry at Berlin, Vermont. After the end of his two-year enlistment, Brown began working as a freelance camp photographer for the 5th Michigan Cavalry, part of George A. Custer's Michigan brigade. Browne wintered with them in their encampment at Stevensburg, Virginia while taking some of the earliest photographs of Brigadier General Custer. In 1864–65 Browne began doing contract work for Alexander Gardner. In May 1865, Maj. General Henry H. Abbot assigned Browne to photograph the James River water batteries around Richmond, Va., thus "preserving an invaluable record of their wonderful completeness." After the war, Gardner published 120 of Browne's negatives as "View of Confederate Water Batteries on the James River." Browne returned to his native Northfield, Vermont, where he died of consumption (tuberculosis) in 1867.

=== Isaac G. and Charles J. Tyson ===
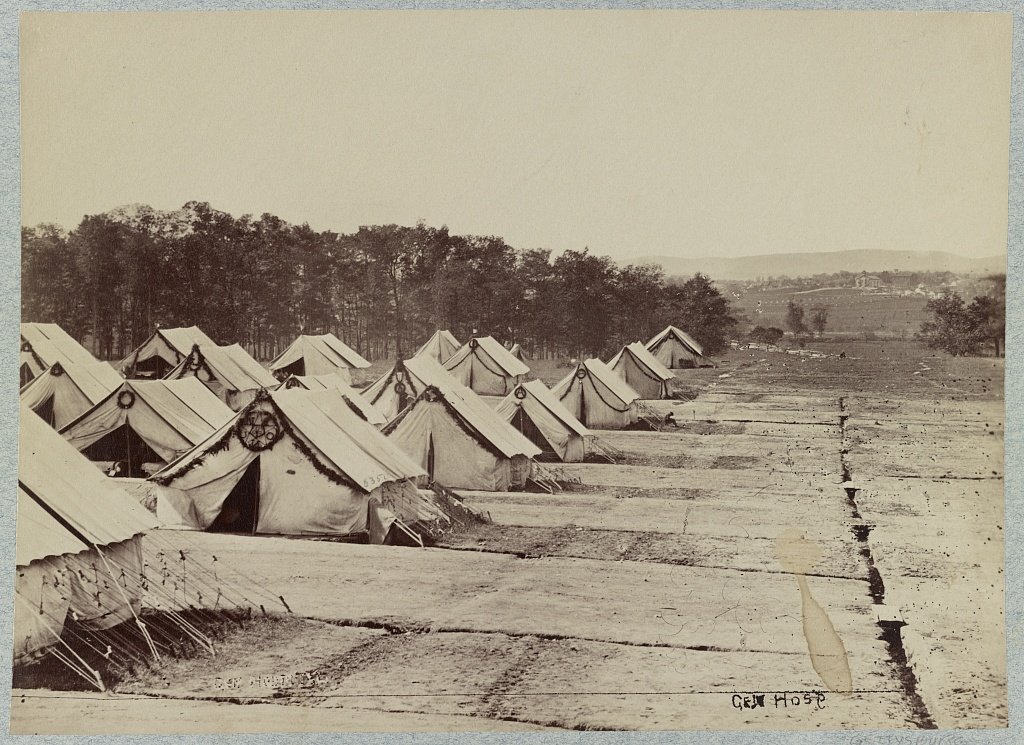
Albumen photograph of a group of tents that were a part of Camp Letterman General Hospital, Gettysburg, PA. – Tyson Bros., August 1863.

Isaac Griffith (1833–1913) and Charles John (1838–1906) Tyson. were residents of Gettysburg, Pa. in July 1863; however, the Tysons' "Tyson's Excelsior Photographic Gallery" wasn't as yet properly equipped to take photographs in the field, for which there was basically no demand at the time. The Tysons evacuated town, as did most of the residents, prior to the Rebel shelling and occupation on July 1. Working in the wake of the July visits to the battlefield by Alexander Gardner and Mathew B. Brady, the Tyson brothers, now fully equipped to take views in the field, by December were offering their "Photographic Views of the Battle-Field of Gettysburg." Then, on November 19, the brothers recorded a number of historic views of the procession to the dedication of the Soldier's National Cemetery, one of which captured President Lincoln on horseback. William H. Tipton, an apprentice of the Tysons, took over the Tyson gallery in 1868.

=== George Stacy ===
Doctors of the 5th NYIR simulating an arm amputation on a Zouave soldier inside Fort Monroe, Virginia – George Stacy, 1861

George Stacy (1831–1897) George Stacy was a Civil War, field photographer and later a prolific publisher of stereoviews, not necessisarily his own. The first reference to George Stacy being a photographer may be in New Brunswick Canada. A photographer by that name placed and advertisement in a Federicton, New Brunswick newspaper dated July 7, 1857. The advertisement stated: "SOMETHING NEW just received in Stacy's Ambrotype room" and advertised stereoscopes and other photographic needs. George Stacy had a storefront at 691 Broadway in New York City, from 1861 to 1865. His earliest confirmed stereoviews are a series he took of the Prince of Whales' visit to Portland, ME. on Oct. 20, 1860. In June 1861 Stacy recorded his renown Fortress Monroe series, where his future brother in law Colin Van Gelder Forbes was serving with Duryee's Zouaves (5th NYVI) at the time. An industry census shows that Stacy was still marketing stereoviews in 1870. However, he's also listed as a farmer in that and the 1880 census, while living in Paterson N.J. It's likely that photography was his winter activity, whereas farming was taken up during the warmer months.

=== Frederick Gutekunst ===
Chambersburg Pike, Gettysburg, Pa. July 1863 – Frederick Gutekunst

Frederick Gutekunst (1831–1917) Pennsylvania photographer, Gutekunst opened two studios in Philadelphia in 1856. On July 9, just six days after the Battle of Gettysburg, Gutekunst produced a series seven large plates of exquisite quality, including the first image of local hero John L. Burns. An elegant portrait of Gen. Ulysses S. Grant stirred national interest and further set the "Dean of American Photographers" apart from his contemporaries. By 1893 he had been in business almost forty years and was residing in the upscale suburb of Germantown. Gutekunst suffered from Bright's Disease, which may have precipitated a fall down some stairs eight weeks before his death.

=== E. T. Whitney ===
Edward Tompkins Whitney (1820–1893) In 1844, Whitney, born in New York City, quit the jewelry business to learn the daguerreotype process from Matrin M. Lawrence, before moving to Rochester New York in 1846, as an operator in the studio of Thomas Mercer. In 1850, J. W. Black of Boston instructed Whitney in the "new art" of wet-plate collodion photography. Whitney opened his own "Skylight Gallery" in Rochester in 1851, and made regular trips to the New York City studios of Matthew Brady and Jeremiah Gurney in order to study the latest improvements in photography. In 1959, after recovering from the ill effects of cyanide poisoning, Whitney sold his Rochester business and moved to New York City, opening a gallery at 585 Broadway with Andrew W. Paradise, Mathew Brady's "right-hand man." Nevertheless, during the winter of 1861–62, Brady would commission Whitney to take "views of the fortifications around Washington and places of interest for the Government." These would include scenes in and around Arlington, Falls Church and Alexandria, VA. In March 1862, Brady again dispatched Whitney and Brady operator, David Woodbury, to take photographs on the Bull Run battlefield. Whitney also relates that he took views at Yorktown, Williamsburg, White House, Gaines' Mill, and Westover and Berkeley Landings during McClellan's Peninsula Campaign. Whitney personally appears in an unusually large number of photographs from 1861 to 1863, and while there is no question that Whitney took photographs for Brady, alas, there are no wartime views specifically ascribed to him. Whitney's last documented self-portrait (Anthony, Views in Washington City, 2733) is on March 27, 1863, during which time he documented the Southern Plains Indian Delegation inside the White House's well lit conservatory (2734, 2735). In addition to Anthony's post-war views with back label attributions to Whitney & Paradise, Whitney is also listed as working with a Mr. Beckwith in Norwalk, Connecticut. from 1865 to 1871, and then alone in Norwalk from 1873 to 1880. Lastly he can be placed in Wilton, Connecticut from 1879 to 1886.

=== Jeremiah Gurney ===
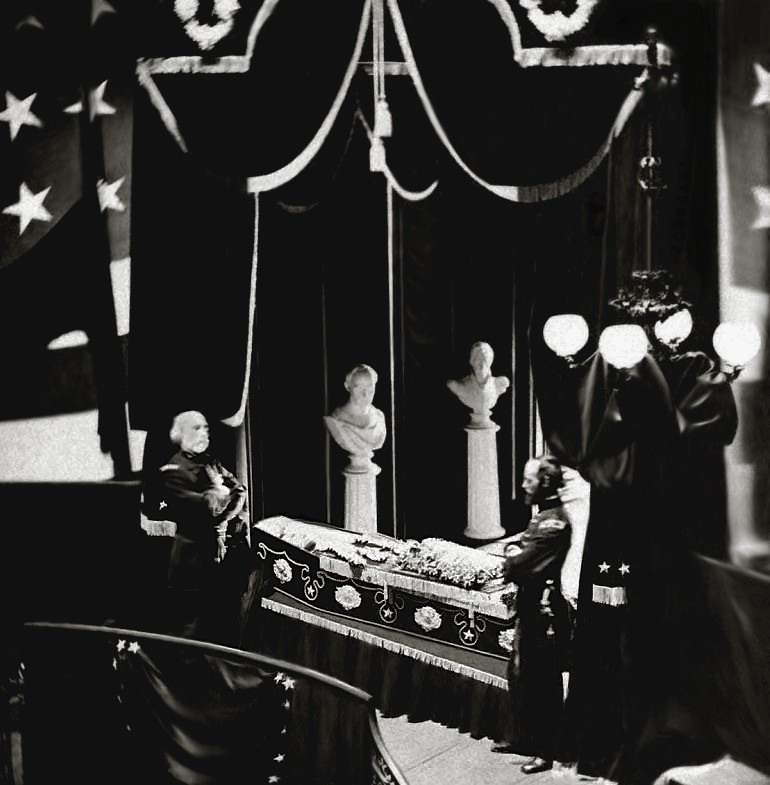
President Lincoln lying in state at New York's City Hall on April 24, 1865 – Jeremiah Gurney

Jeremiah Gurney (1812–1895) was born in Coeymans, New York. Gurney, then a jeweler in Saratoga, N.Y. became one of the first, if not the first student in America to learn the "new art" of daguerreian photography. Gurney was taught the process by Samuel F.B. Morse in 1839, who explained to Gurney that "What you will have to allow for is the initial outlay . . And there is of course my fee." The fee was thought to have been fifty dollars. Gurney was not listed in the New York city directories until 1843, when he appears as a daguerreian at 189 Broadway. In the 1850s "Gurney's Daguerreian Gallery" offered mammoth daguerreotype prints from double full size plates. In 1852, he took time off to recover from a common illness of the daguerreian trade, mercury vapor poisoning. In 1857 Gurney was listed in the New York City Directory at 359 Broadway, in partnership with C.D Fredericks. In 1860, he was listed as a "photographist" at 707 Broadway, in business as "J. Gurney and Son." Gurney and son Benjamin advanced paper photography with the use of the "Chrystalotype" process. Jeremiah Gurney is probably best known for his having taken a photograph of Abraham Lincoln in an open coffin April 24, 1865, as the President's body lay in state in City Hall, New York City. The episode caused much distress to Mary Lincoln, who had forbid the taking of any photographs of her husband's corpse. Secretary of War Edwin Stanton was furious and succeeded in confiscating all of the existing prints and negatives but one (That print, secreted away by Lincoln secretary John Hay was rediscovered in 1952 at the Illinois State Historical Library by 14-year-old Ronald Rietveld). In 1874 Gurney's partnership with his son was dissolved. In his memoirs, Gurney stated that in 1895, at 83 years old, "I am currently semi-retired from the photographic arts industry, living here in Coxsackie [New York] with my daughter Martha. Jeremiah Gurney died that same year.

=== G. O. Brown ===
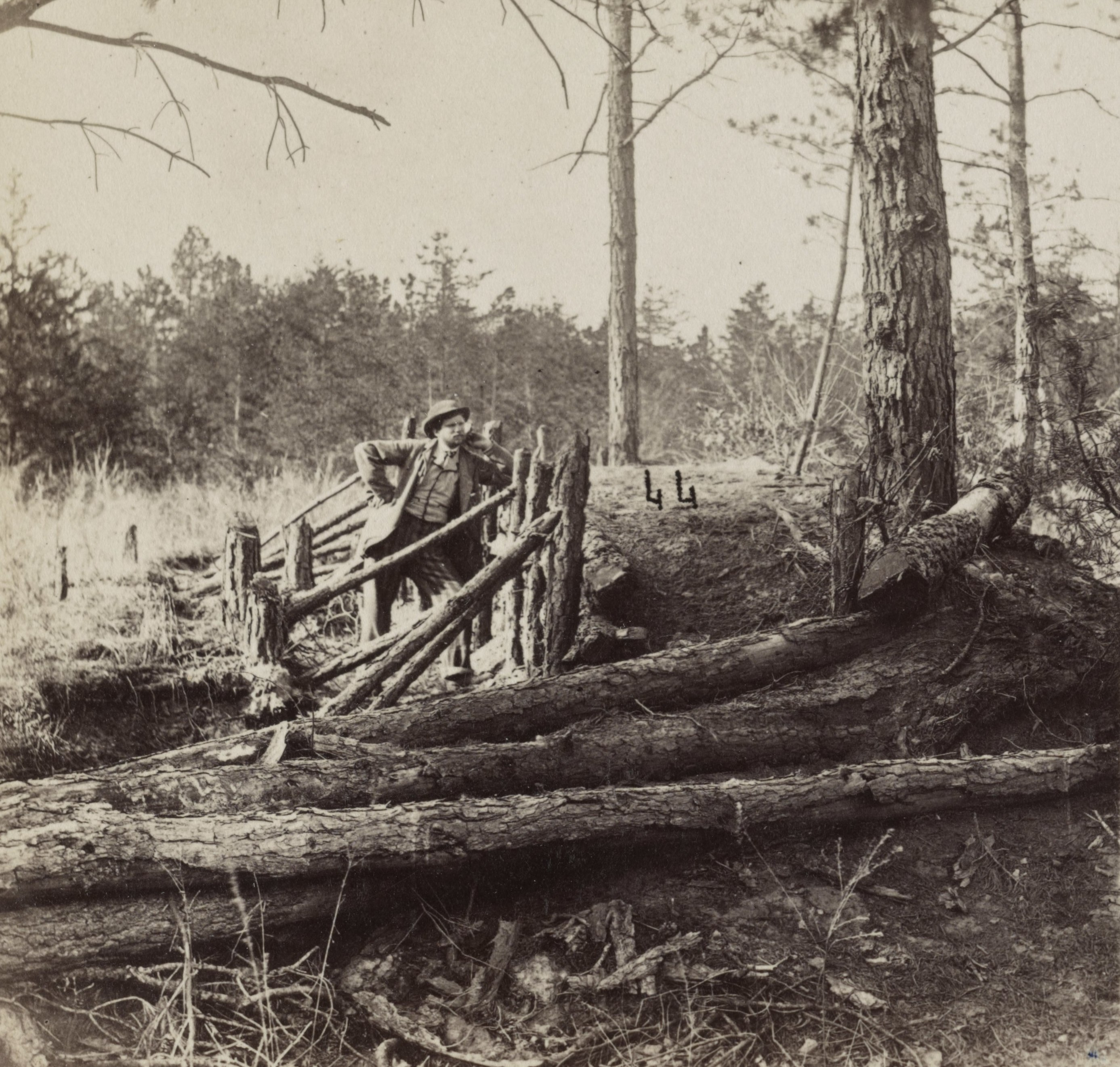
Half stereo detail of George Chancellor on the Wilderness Battlefield, standing at some Confederate breastworks near Palmer's field on the Orange Turnpike – George Oscar Brown, 1866

George Oscar Brown (?–?) Active 1860–1889. Information on Brown is scant. In April 1866, under the direction of Dr. Reed Bonteceau, Brown, at the time just a hospital steward at the Army Medical Museum in Washington, D.C., was hired as an assistant cameraman by the museum's photographer, William Bell. The assignment was primarily to document medical specimens (bones, skulls &c.) on the Wilderness and Spotsylvania battlefields of Virginia. Their guide on that occasion was none other than Lt. George E. Chancellor, Co. E, 9th Va. Cav., after whose family the battlefield is named. Though new to the field of photography, Brown did respectable work, producing a number of stereo photographs that have aided in our comprehension of those terrible battles. In the 1868 census, Brown was listed as a photographer at the Medical Museum. By 1870, Brown was promoting and instructing others in the use of the "Porcelain Print" process, which was patented by photographer Egebert Guy Fowx. In 1872 Brown was elected Secretary of The Maryland Photographic Association. Brown's trail is lost after 1873.

=== Haas and Peale ===
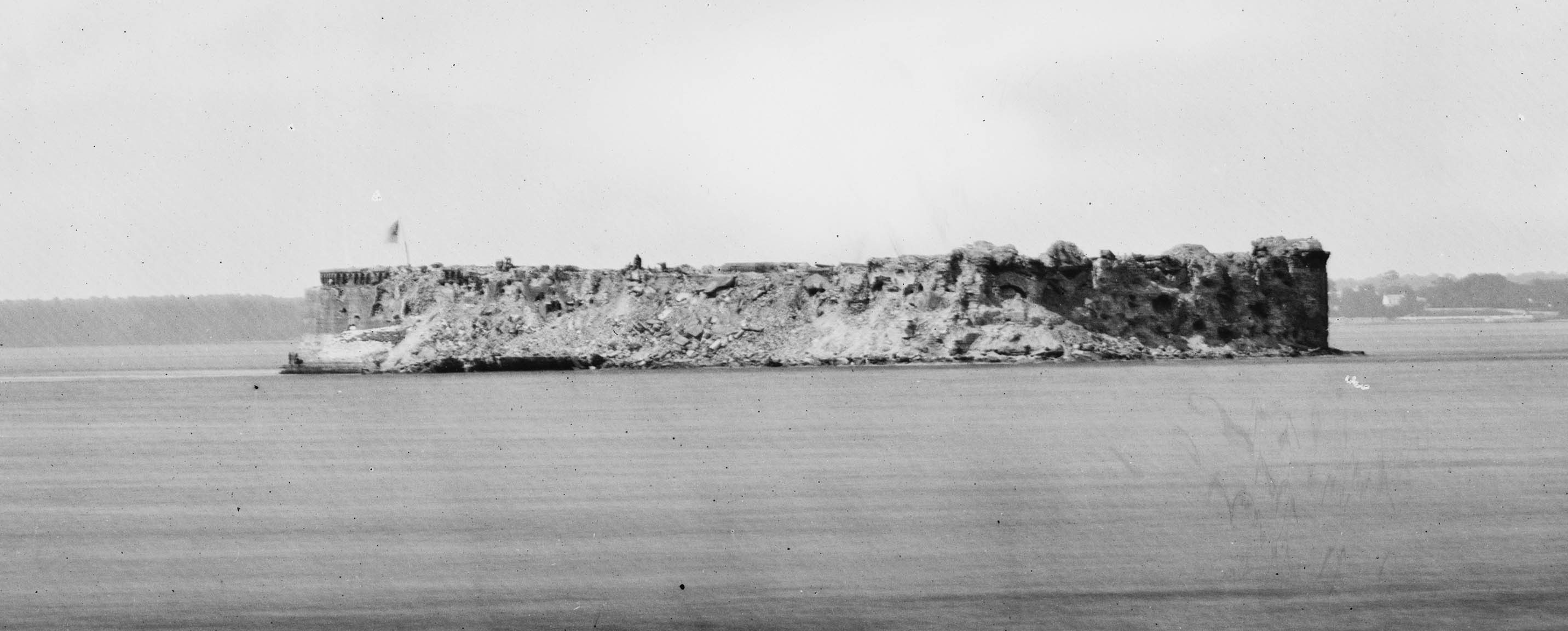
Fort Sumter, reduced to a shapeless pile of rubble, photographed by Haas & Peale across an active front (Note the Confederate flag flying above the parapet), soon after the evacuations of batteries Greg and Wagner on Sept. 7, 1863

Philip Haas (1808–1871) and Washington Peale (1825–1868) While but little is known of Haas' early personal history, almost nothing is known about Peale. In 1839–40, Haas, a lithographer based in Washington, D.C., endeavored to learn the new art of the "daguerreotype." By 1852, forty-four year old Haas was an accomplished wet-plate photographer, with a studio in New York City "near the corner of White Street." On September 23, 1861, fifty-three year old Haas enlisted with the 1st N.Y. Engineers, claiming he was forty-three. Haas was mustered on January 17, 1862, as a 2nd Lt. in Company A. Special Order No. 248, dated July 15, 1862, Hilton Head, Port Royal, detailed Haas for "special service at headquarters." In 1863, Haas and newly acquired assistant Washington Peale were taking photographs of General Quincy Gilmore's siege operations on Morris Island. The pair are credited with dozens of views of the activities of the Union Army in South Carolina during the Civil War, including Folly Island, Fort Sumter, Charleston Harbor, Lighthouse Inlet and Morris Island. Haas resigned his commission due to ill health on May 25, 1863, but continued taking photographs for the War Department. After 1863, the trail of his life grows thin. Of particular historic significance is the pair's "Unidentified camp", recognized in the year 2000 by South Carolina, author Jack Thompson to be among the world's very first photographs of actual combat. It depicts monitor-class ironclads and U.S.S. New Ironsides in action off Morris Island, South Carolina. A September 8, 1863, date has been suggested for the photo, however during that action the 17-gun frigate was engaging Fort Moultrie at close range and out of view of the Federal camps which were 4 miles (6 km) away. In fact, it was Southern photographer George S. Cook, who was taking combat action photographs from the parapet of Fort Sumter on September 8, while he himself was being shelled by monitor "Weehawken", grounded off Cummings Point. A more plausible opportunity for Haas and Peale to have captured U.S.S. New Ironsides in action would have been the extended period from September 5–6, when for 36 straight hours the ironclads engaged batteries Wagner and Gregg (top photo), prior to the Rebel evacuations on September 7.

=== John Carbutt ===
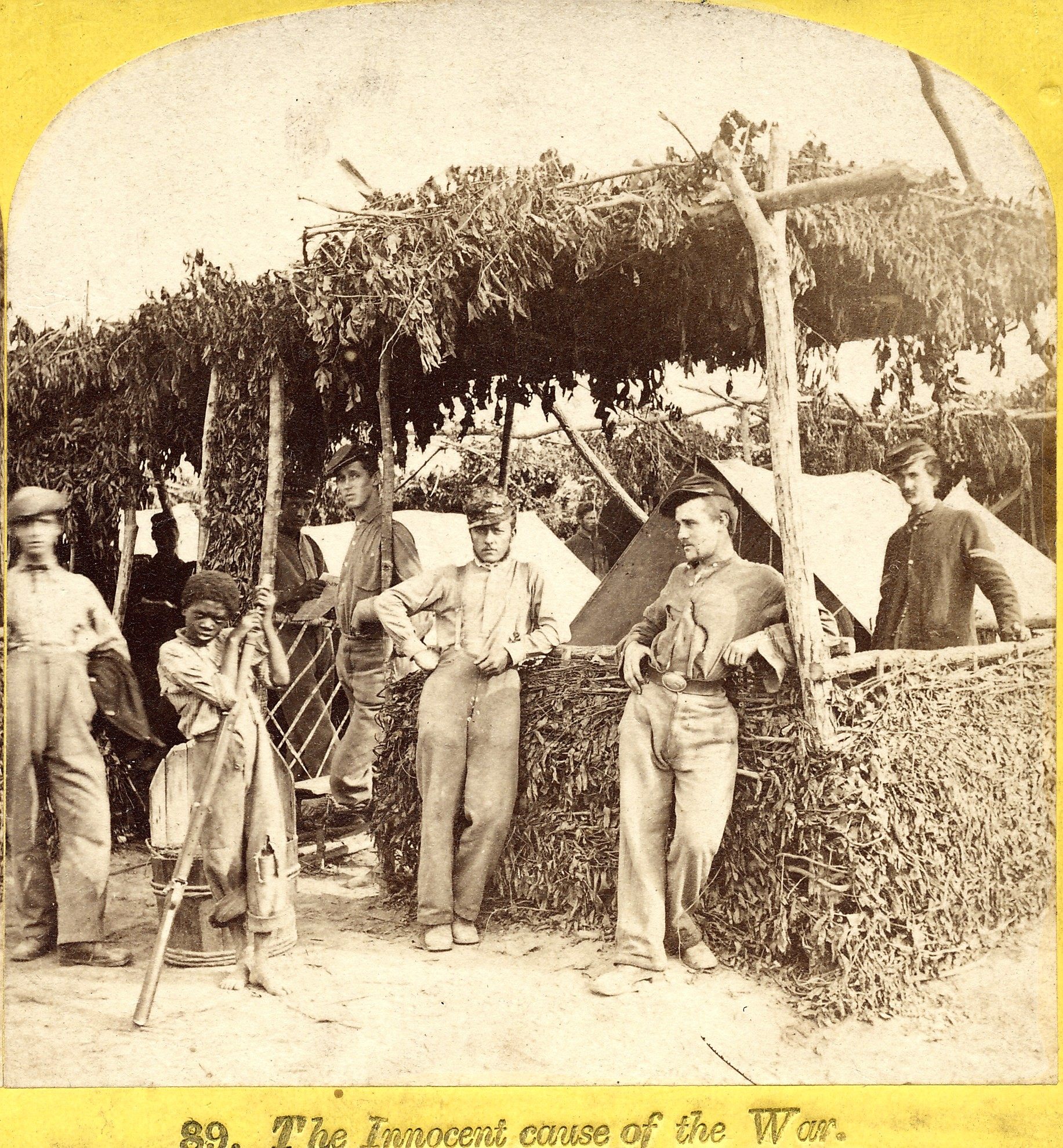
134th Illinois Regiment, Columbus, Kentucky – Carbutt, 1864

John Carbutt (1832–1905) was born in Sheffield, England. His first stop in the New World was Canada. The Chicago, Illinois city directory of 1861 is the first to bear his name in the United States. During the 1860s in Chicago, Carbutt was a prolific producer of stereoviews of Chicago, the Upper Mississippi, and the "Great West." Western images included the construction of the Union Pacific Railroad and portraits of Indians. Carbutt may be best recognized for his significant contributions to the advancement of photographic processes in the 19th century and early 20th century. He was among the earliest photographers to experiment with magnesium light (January 1865), he experimented with dry plates as early as 1864 and began producing commercial dry plates in 1879. Carbutt and Dr. Arthur W. Goodspeed produced the earliest X-ray photographs in February 1896. Thus it is no wonder that his biographer William Brey barely mentions his Civil War photographs. The largest known output of Civil War photographs by Carbutt are 40 or so stereoviews of the 134th Illinois Infantry camped at Columbus, Kentucky. The 134th was a 100-day unit that were in Columbus from June 1864 until October 1864. Lincoln's funeral train was photographed by Carbutt as it passed through Chicago on May 1, 1865, and he followed the train to Springfield where he obtained photographs of Lincoln's home. The last of the great Sanitary Fairs was held in Chicago in June 1865 and Carbutt was there to photograph the interior and exterior of the second Northwestern Soldiers Fair. The Illinois soldiers' homes at Chicago and Cairo, Illinois required continued funding, and the fair helped cover other continuing expenses of the Northwestern Sanitary Commission.

=== Bierstadt Brothers ===
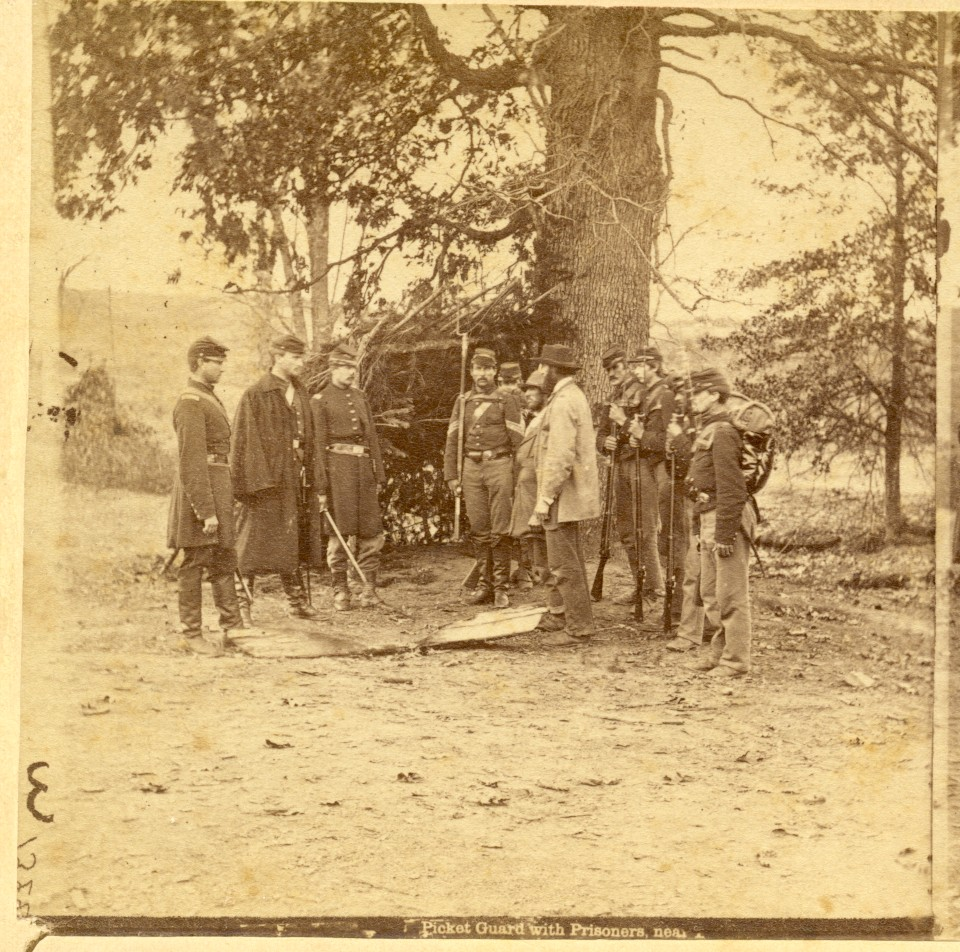
7th New York Regiment picket guard with prisoners, near Lewinsville, Virginia – Edward Bierstadt, 1862

The Bierstadt Brothers consisted of Edward (1824–1906), Charles (1828–1903) and Albert Bierstadt (1830–1902) who immigrated with their parents to New Bedford, Massachusetts in 1831 from Solingen, Germany. The Bierstadt brothers opened a photographic gallery in New Bedford which they operated from 1859 to about 1867. Albert seems to have been the driving force behind the brothers' Civil War images. He and his friend Emanuel Leutze obtained passes in October 1861 from Gen. Winfield Scott to travel, photograph and sketch along the Potomac River outside of Washington, D.C. They took 19 stereoview photographs of war-time Washington, D.C., and its nearby defenses. The photographs of defenses showed Union pickets near Lewinsville, Virginia and scenes at Camp Griffin, which was near Lewinsville. Troops photographed include the 43rd Regiment New York Volunteers and the 49th Regiment Pennsylvania Volunteers. These images were published by the Bierstadt Brothers in New Bedford, Massachusetts. Edward ran a temporary studio in Langley near the 43rd New York's quarters at Camp Griffin. There he joined other photographers, including George Houghton, who took some iconic photographs of the Vermont Brigade in Northern Virginia. Washington, D.C., was not the brothers' only foray into Civil War photography. They published 8 views of the Metropolitan (Sanitary) Fair that took place in New York City in April 1864. Albert Bierstadt had an exhibit at the fair featuring Native American culture. After the partnership broke up around 1867 Albert pursued his career as an artist and became a member of the Hudson River school of artists. He is best known for his dramatic paintings of the Western United States. Edward and Charles continued independent careers as photographers.

=== Henry P. Moore ===
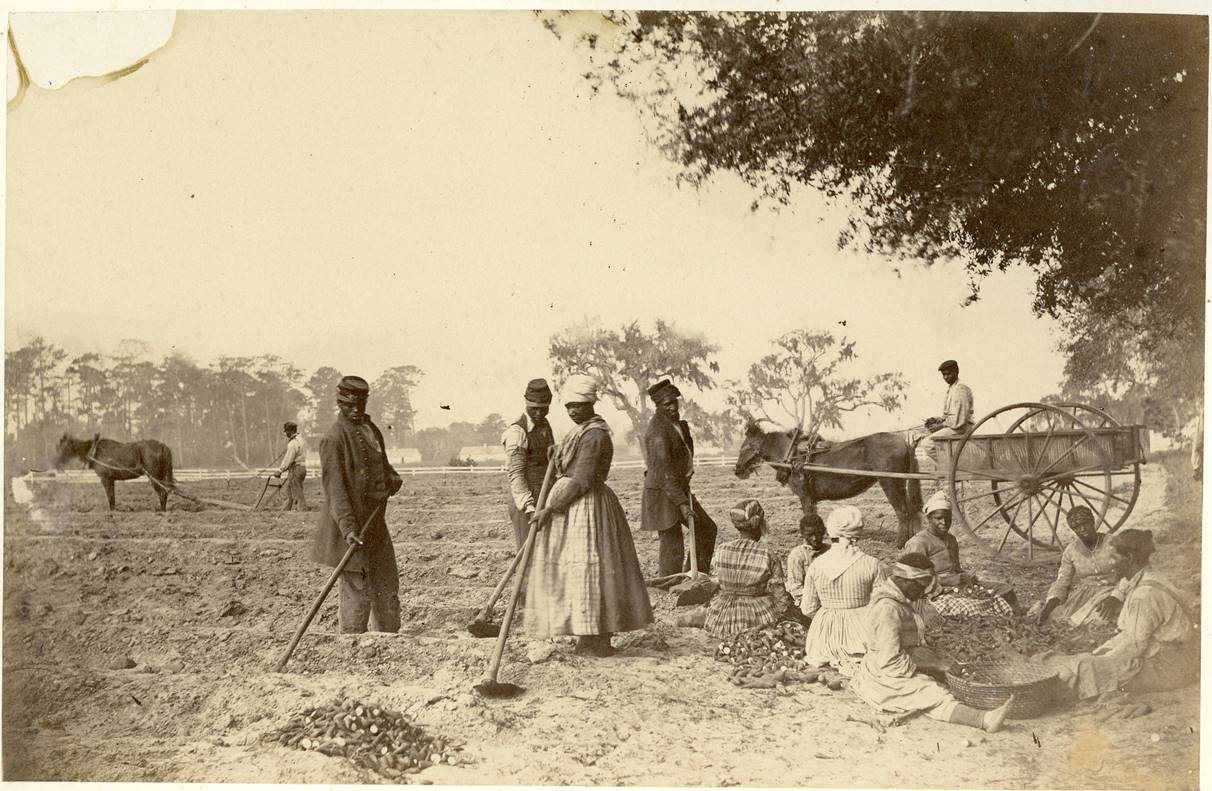
"Contraband" planting sweet potatoes on Hopkinson's Plantation, Edisto Island, S.C. – Henry Moore, 1862

Henry P. Moore (1835–1911) was born in Goffstown, New Hampshire. His family moved to Concord, New Hampshire when Henry was seven. By 1862 Moore was a "well known" photographer in Concord, New Hampshire. His entrance into Civil War photography occurred when Moore followed the Third New Hampshire Regiment soldiers to Hilton Head, South Carolina in February 1862 and stayed through April or May 1862. His photography studio on the island of Hilton Head, South Carolina, comprised a tent set up in a sandy cotton field. He took at least one more trip to the same area that extended from April 22 to the end of May, 1863. The glass plate negatives he used measured 5 by 8 inches (130 mm × 200 mm). Photographic prints were sold at his Concord, NH gallery for one dollar each. Moore produced more than 60 photographs of the South. The images include extensive coverage of the Third New Hampshire Regiment, but are not limited to that. He photographed scenes around Hilton Head, the 6th Connecticut, Signal Corps, 1st Massachusetts Cavalry, navy ships and sailors. Military operations were not his only interest. Scenes of plantations and recently freed slaves fill out his portfolio. He photographed cotton processing and slave quarters on Hilton Head, J.E. Seabrook's plantation on Edisto Island, and "contrabands" harvesting sweet potatoes at Hopkinson's Plantation on Edisto Island. Moore continued as a photographer in Concord, NH after the war. In 1900 he moved to Buffalo, New York closer to his daughter Alice. He died in 1911 in Buffalo, but is buried in his hometown of Concord, NH.

== Southern photographers ==
In the first months of the war, southern photographers actively documented in the field through their images. In fact, a Southerner took the first photographs of the war inside Fort Sumter. However, as a consequence of the war and rampant inflation most were soon out of business. War photographs were long regarded with extreme disfavor in the South after the rebellion, and most were disposed of. This was not the case for the many cherished family portraits of Confederate servicemen who lived and died during the war. These photographs are among the last known records of who they were and what they looked like.

=== George S. Cook ===
George Cook, half stereo of Federal ironclads firing on Fort Moultrie, Sept 8, 1863 (click to enlarge) – The Valentine, Richmond, Va.

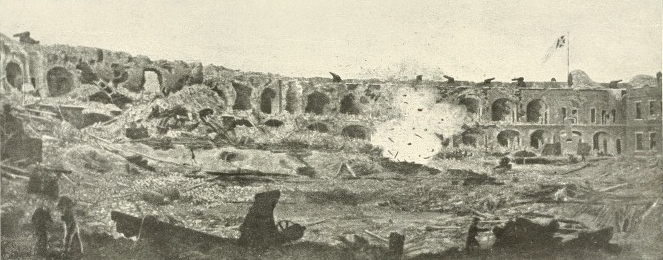
Lt. John R. Key's (CSA) "exploding shell" painting, of the interior of Fort Sumter – The Valentine, Richmond, Va.

The most renowned Southern photographer was George Smith Cook (1819–1902). The native of Stamford, Connecticut, was not successful in the mercantile business, so he moved to New Orleans and became a portrait painter. This proved unprofitable and in 1842 Cook began working with the "new art" of the daguerreotype, settling in Charleston, South Carolina, where he raised a family. Cook's status as one of the South's most famous photographers was due in part to his visit to Fort Sumter on Feb. 8, 1861, which resulted in the first mass marketing of cartes-de-visite, a photograph of the fort's commander, Maj. Robert Anderson. A successful portrait business that survived the war, and the systematic documentation of Union shelling of Charleston and in particular, Fort Sumter added to Cook's fame. Then, on September 8, 1863, he and business partner James Osborn photographed the inside of Fort Sumter, and as luck would have it, also captured the developing naval action in the harbor, Federal ironclads firing on Fort Moultrie. The historic images depict three ironclad monitors and U.S.S. New Ironsides firing on Fort Moultrie in defense of monitor U.S.S. Weehawken, grounded off Cummings Point. For unknown reasons, the historic stereoview was not marketed until 1880, when it was finally offered for sale by Cook's son, George LaGrange Cook. Sadly, Cook's extensive collection, mainly consisting of portraits of notable Southern personalities, was lost on Feb. 17, 1865, when his Columbia, S.C. studio was destroyed during the firestorm that engulfed the capital city. Cook moved his family to Richmond in 1880, and his older son, George LaGrange Cook, took charge of the studio in Charleston. In Richmond, Cook bought up the businesses of photographers who were retiring, or moving from the city. He thus amassed the most comprehensive collection of prints and negatives of the former Confederate capital known to exist. Cook remained an active photographer for the remainder of his life. In 1891, one year before George's death, George Jr. joined his father and younger brother Huestis in Richmond. After George Jr's death in 1919, Huestis took over the Richmond studio.

Note: The famous "exploding shell" photo falsely attributed to Cook is in reality a painting by C.S.A. Lt. John R. Key, based on three half stereos taken by Cook inside Fort Sumter on Sept. 8, 1863. Experts had overlooked the fact that no camera of the time was capable of taking the wide angle depicted.

=== Osborn & Durbec ===
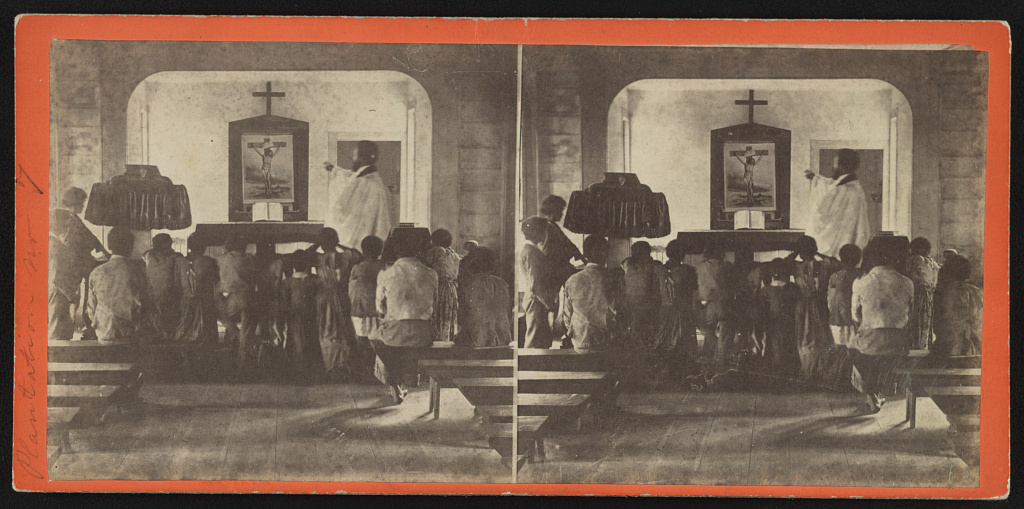
Rockville Plantation Negro church, Charleston, S.C. (LOC, Robin Stanford Collection) O&D, 1860

In 1858, James M. Osborn (1811–1868), a 47 year old daguerreian, native of New York, living in Charleston, S.C., joined forces with 22 year old Charleston native, Frederick Eugene Durbec (1836–1894). Both were soon to become among the war's first photographers. By 1860, from their state-of-the-art, high-volume studio, they had reached a national audience with their advertised "largest and most varied assortment of stereoscopic instruments and pictures ever offered in this country." By then, both had joined the Lafayette Artillery, Durbec having risen to the rank of colonel. It was also at this time that O&D produced documentary photographs of the city and its vicinity, including their singularly historic, antebellum scenes of plantations and slave life. Following the Federal surrender of Fort Sumter on April 14, 1861, Osborn would visit the fort and its surrounds on at least two occasions, taking at least 43 stereo images of the battle's aftermath, in what is the largest known group of Confederate images of the war, and which is considered the most comprehensive photographic record of a Civil War engagement ever made. Today, thirty-nine are known to exist. Their friendship would outlast their Charleston business however, which the war and damaging fires had brought to an end by February 1862. Then, in September 1863, in response to Gen. Thomas Jordan's desire to document what "Southern troops could endure", Osborn and fellow artist George S. Cook volunteered to photograph the interior of Fort Sumter, which had been shelled by Union batteries into a shapeless mass. Little did the enterprising partners know that one result of this visit would be the first combat photographs in history.

=== J.D. Edwards ===
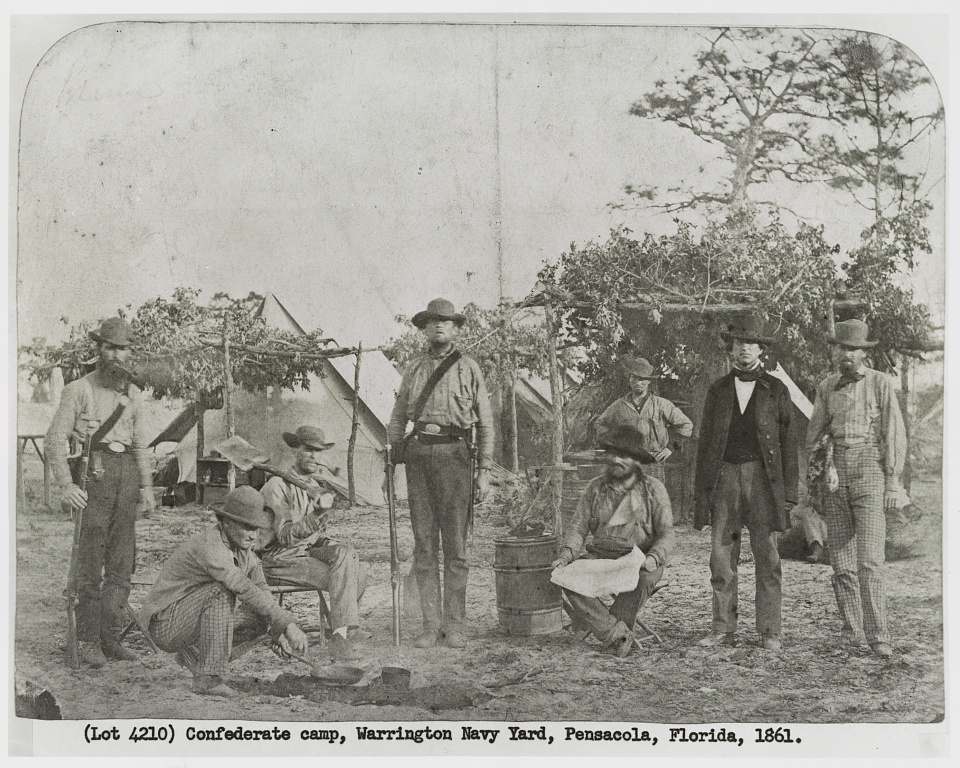
Co. B, 9th Miss. in bivouac at Warrington Navy Yard, Pensacola, Fl. The cook is identified as Kinloch Falconer – J.D. Edwards 1861 (LOC B8184-10016)

Jay Dearborn Edwards (1831–1900), a New Hampshire native, was born Jay Dearborn Moody, on July 14, 1831. After the death of his father in 1842, young Jay was sent to St. Louis to live with an aunt, at which time his surname was changed to Edwards. By age 17, he was a lecturer on the pseudoscience phrenology, and apparently also began his photographic career, operating a daguerreian studio at 92-1/2 Fourth Street. In 1851, he and his aunt moved to New Orleans, and Jay quickly established himself at 19 Royal Street. He preferred working outdoors in his "queer-looking wagon." The new art of wet-plate photography enabled Edwards to distribute his stereoscopic views images throughout New Orleans. Because his stereo cards had a P.O. box number imprinted on the backs, historians have concluded he did not operate his own gallery in New Orleans. However, that changed when he and E. H. Newton Jr. formed a partnership and opened the Gallery of Photographic Art, located at 19 Royal Street. The gallery specialized in "stereoscopic views of any part of the world," and was assisted by New York publisher Edward Anthony and the London Stereoscopic Company. Their diverse inventory included an array of photographic equipment, photographs, ambrotypes, melainotypes, portrait enlargements, pastel, oil, and watercolor prints. Edwards undertook one of the earliest wartime photo expeditions by venturing into the field in April 1861. He followed Confederate units from New Orleans to Pensacola, Fl., as they mobilized against Fort Pickens. Edwards advertised 39 views at "$1 per copy." Two were reproduced as woodcuts in Harper's Weekly in June, though Edwards received no credit. Afterwards, Edward was apparently out of business.

=== McPherson & Oliver ===
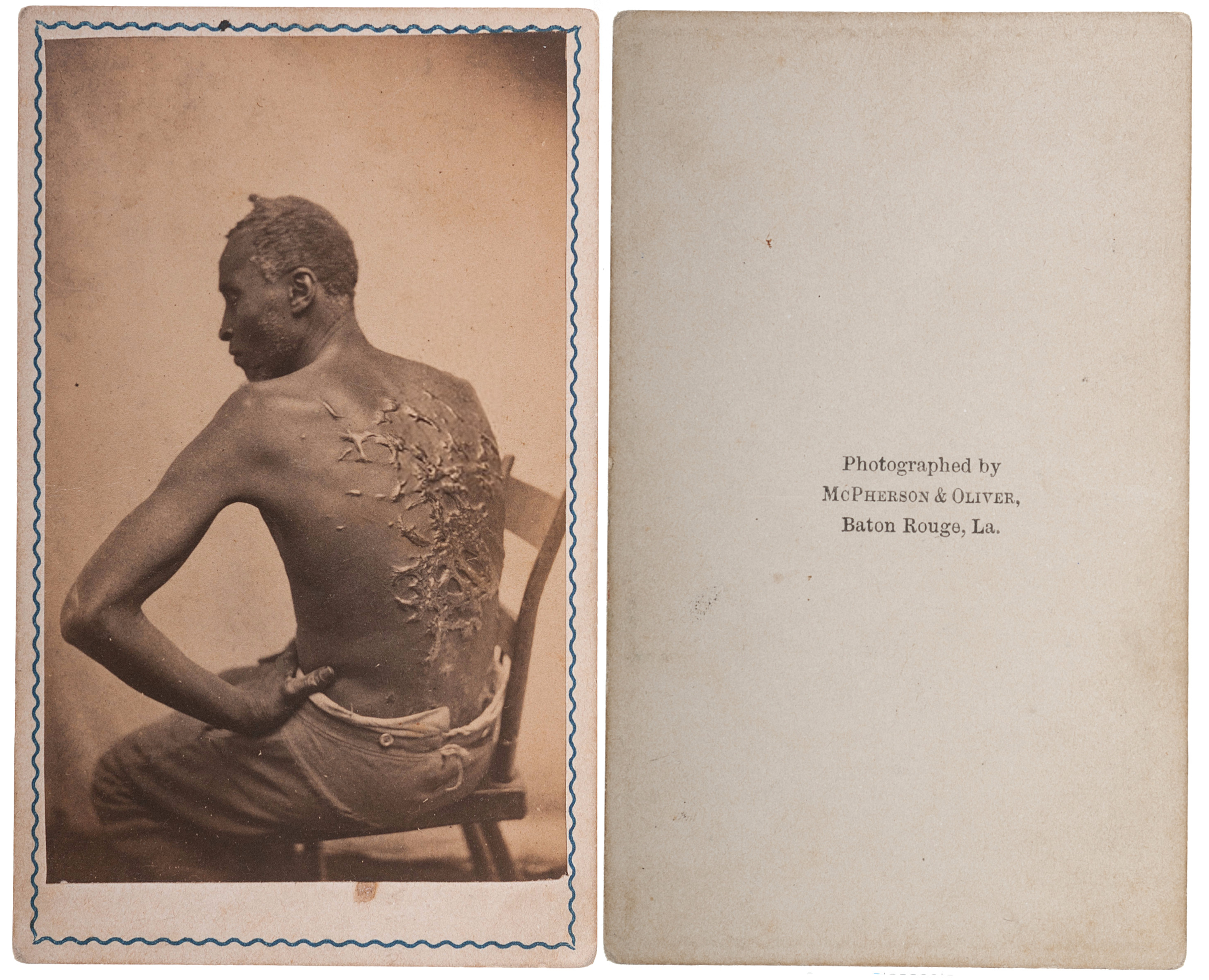
CDV The Scourged Back of "Gordon" an escaped slave from Louisiana - McPherson & Oliver, 1863

William D. McPherson (January 15, 1825 – October 9, 1867) and J. Oliver (?–?) were Southern photographers active in New Orleans and Baton Rouge, Louisiana, in the 1860s. McPherson & Oliver's business was exclusively Confederate, until Union forces occupied Baton Rouge in May 1862. Like other Southern photographers in occupied cities, the pair quickly adapted to the occupation. This arrangement had the benefit of being able to procure photography supplies through special arrangements with the military. McPherson & Oliver are probably best known for "The Scourged Back", their sensational, widely published portrait of "Gordon", an escaped slave from a Louisiana plantation, who came into the Union lines at Baton Rouge. The pair went to Port Hudson, La. in the summer of 1863 and photographed the hard-fought siege of that city. After the fall of Port Hudson on July 8, McPherson & Oliver photographed the captured, Confederate fortifications. In August 1864, following the capture of Fort Morgan on Mobile Bay, Alabama, McPherson & Oliver made a comprehensive photographic record of that installation. In 1864 they moved to New Orleans and operated a gallery at 133 Canal Street. On April 26, 1865, "J. Oliver, 132 Canal, photographer" appeared as number 3490 a second district of New Orleans military draft list. In 1865 they dissolved their partnership. McPherson carried on with his own gallery at 132 Canal St. until his death from yellow fever in 1867. Samuel T. Blessing, who survived the epidemic, administered McPherson's estate.

=== Charles Richard Rees ===
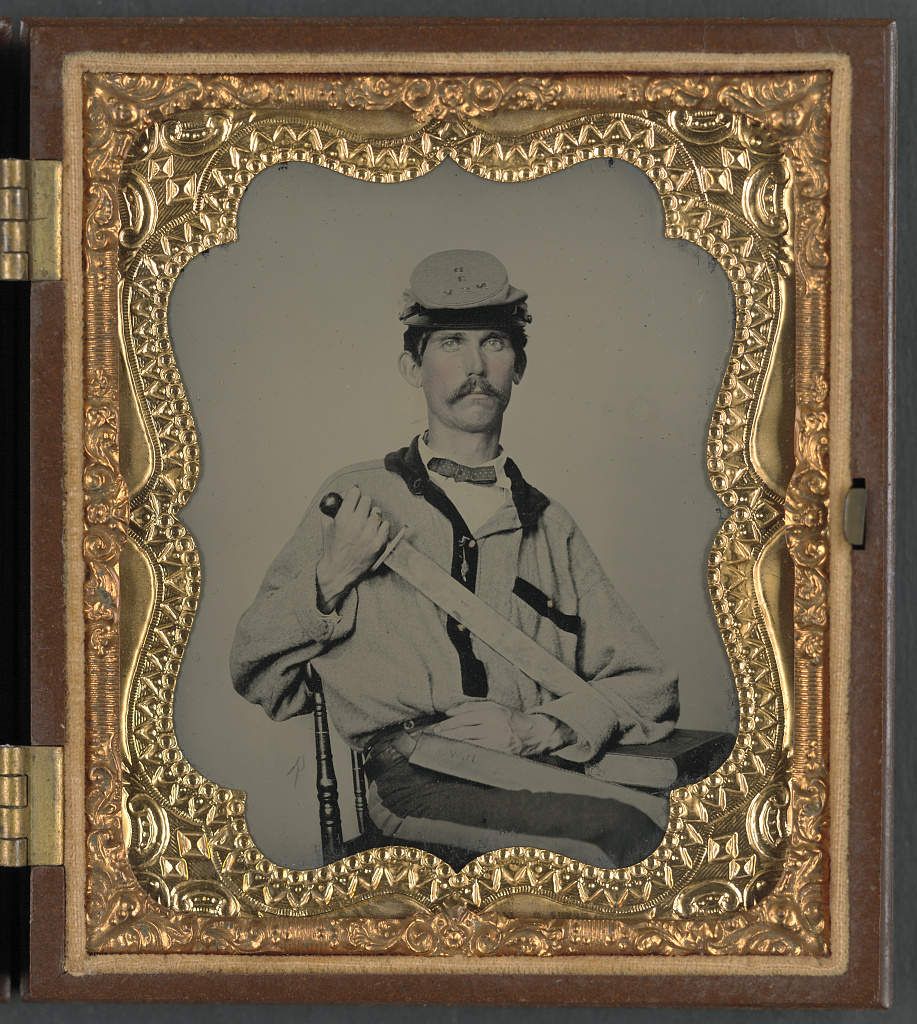
Sixth plate ambrotype of Private John L. Wood, Co. D, 3rd NCIR, showing an "Arkansas Toothpick" and sheath, with initials J.L.W. – Rees, 1861

Charles Richard Rees (January 26, 1825 – 1914) was born in Allentown, Pennsylvania to German immigrants Bernard and Sarah Rees. Charles started his career as a daguerreotypist in Cincinnati around 1850. In 1851, Charles and his brother Edwin opened a studio in Richmond, Virginia near the Capitol. By 1853, Charles had relocated to the former studio of Harrison and Holmes at 289 Broadway, NYC, in what was then the new photographic industry's epicenter. Lower Manhattan contained the studios of some of the best photographers in the business, such as Henry Ulke, Mathew Brady, Jeremiah Gurney, Edward Anthony and Abraham Bogardus. Competition was fierce so "Professor" Rees passed himself off as a European political refugee with an innovative "German method of picture making." This method employed a division of labor in which all the process' steps were done by a so-called "expert." To compete, Charles cut his prices on portraits to twenty-five cents for a 1/9th plate and sixty-two cents with a case, a low price even by 1850 standards. After only a little more than two years in business, Charles moved from New York City. By 1859, 30 y.o. Charles, with his brother Edwin, returned to the soon-to-be capital of the Confederacy, Richmond, Virginia and again set up shop. They called their new studio "Rees' Steam Gallery." At the beginning of the Civil War, the influx of politicians and particularly soldiers meant a dramatic increase in business, and the brothers were kept busy with hundreds of new recruits flocking to their gallery. Caught up in the patriotic fervor of the time, Charles soon joined the 19th Virginia Militia, a regiment made up of shopkeepers, railroad workers and local firemen, who were used primarily as prison guards, but who were also used in extreme emergencies. As the war progressed, acute shortages of everything was the norm and most retail shops in Richmond, including Rees' studio, eventually closed down altogether. As Grant advanced on Petersburg on April 3, 1863, Richmond was evacuated. General Ewell ordered Richmond's warehouses put to the torch. The fires soon got out of control and engulfed the entire business district, including the Rees Brothers' studio. However, almost as soon as the fires were put out rebuilding soon began and Rees was back in business at a new studio named "Rees & Bro." at 913 Main Street. Then, in 1880, for reasons not entirely clear Charles relocated his studio to Petersburg, Virginia, setting up shop at the J. E. Rockwell Gallery on Sycamore Street. Charles Rees died in 1914 at the age of 84 and was buried in Hollywood Cemetery with his wife Minerva and sons Eddie and Charles Jr. The Rees studio would continue operating under his only surviving child, James Conway Rees. James lived until 1955 and was one of the few men left who might have remembered the Civil War and his father's work during that conflict. With the coming of the Great Depression, the Rees Studio in Petersburg took its last photograph and closed its doors.

=== Andrew D. Lytle ===
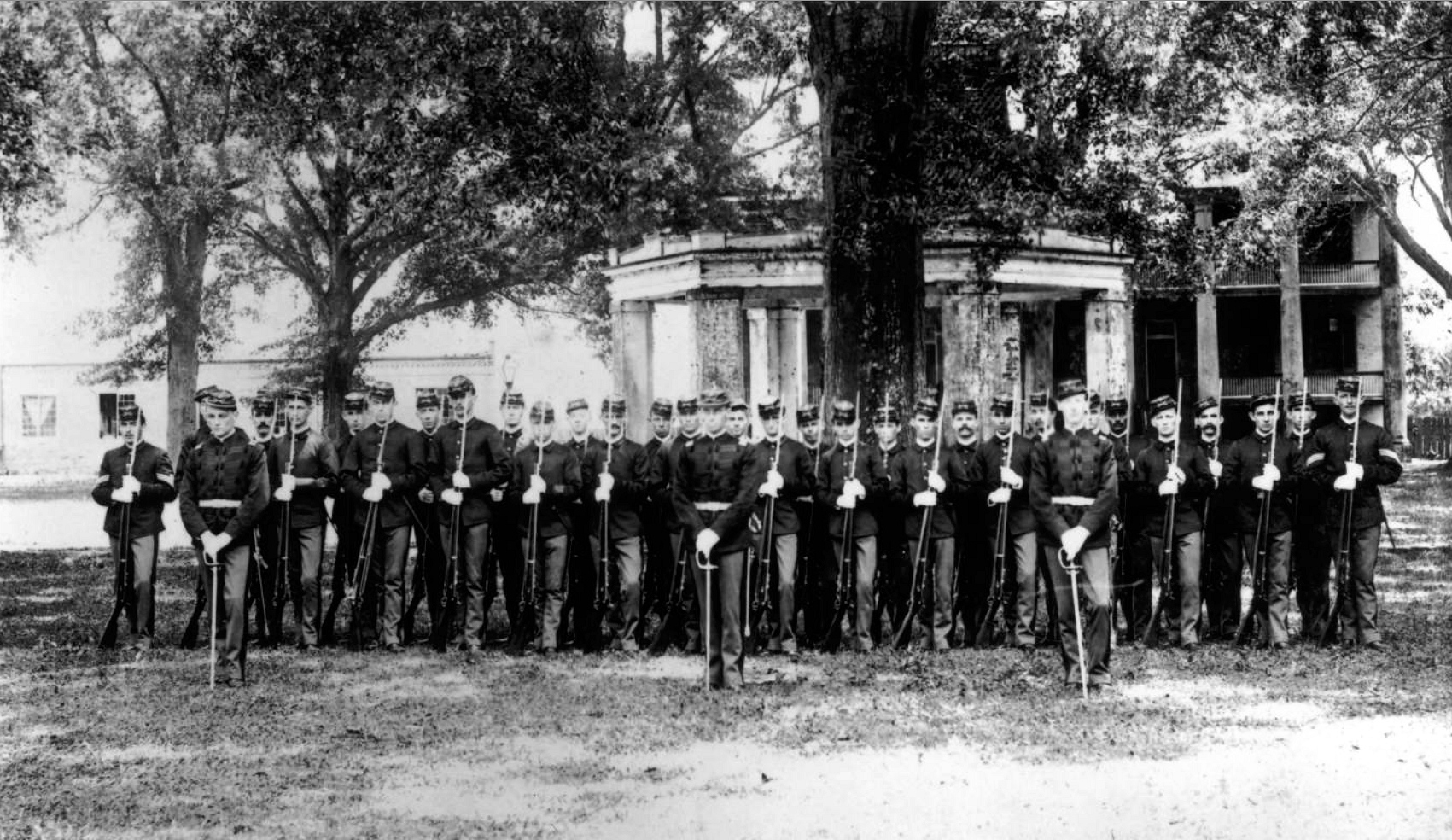
United States Army soldiers in formation, Baton Rouge, about 1863, by Andrew David Lytle

Andrew David Lytle (1858–1917) was an itinerant photographer in Cincinnati, Ohio, who worked throughout the mid-South. In 1858, he opened a studio on Main Street in Baton Rouge, Louisiana, and for the next half-century recorded the places, events and faces of Louisiana's capital city. Lytle's remarkable photograph of the 1st Indiana H.A. is just one of many made in Baton Rouge during its occupation by Union forces. After federal forces occupied Baton Rouge in May 1862, Lytle developed a lucrative photographic relationship with the U.S. Army and Navy. Besides providing studio portraits for members of the occupying forces, Lytle photographed the occupying army encampments around Baton Rouge as well as the Navy's West Gulf Blockading Squadron under Admiral James Glasgow Farragut and the Mississippi River Squadron. Many of Lytle's civil war era works are preserved in the 'Andrew D. Lytle's Baton Rouge' Photograph Collection at Louisiana State University. Lytle's studio was so successful during the civil war that he was able to buy property with buildings near the Louisiana Governor's Mansion, which became the Lytle family home for the next sixty years. As Louisiana emerged from Reconstruction, Lytle was joined in the business by his son Howard, operating under the name of Lytle Studio and, later, Lytle & Son.

=== Julian Vannerson ===
Julian Vannerson (1827–?) In 1857, Julian Vannerson was a daguerrean portrait artist and principal operator for the James Earle McClees gallery in Washington, D.C., at 308 Pennsylvania Avenue. In 1859 Vannerson's autographed prints were published in McClees' gallery of photographic portraits of the senators, representatives & delegates of the thirty-fifth Congress. His portraiture of Native Americans were part of a systematic effort to document members of treaty delegations who came to Washington, D.C. After the Civil War broke out, operating out of Richmond, Vannerson continued making portraits of famous Confederate general officers, using his preferred method, the "salt" print. He is best known for his portrait photographs of Confederate generals Robert E. Lee and J.E.B. Stuart and Stonewall Jackson. Vannerson closed his business and sold his equipment at war's end.

== Clandestine photography ==
=== Andrew David Lytle ===
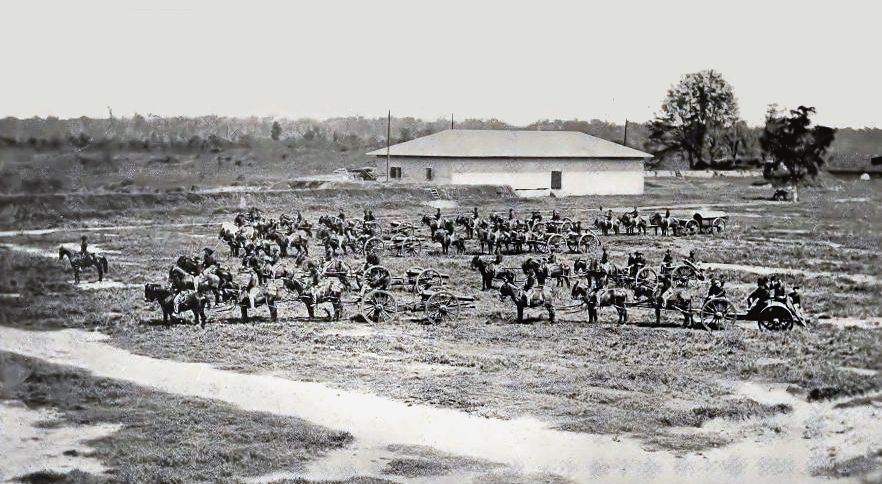
1st Indiana Heavy Artillery

In 1910 an agent for The Reviews of Reviews Company, New York, publisher of The Photographic History of the Civil War, purchased most of the surviving negatives Baton Rouge photographer Andrew Lytle had created during the Federal occupation of Baton Rouge. The agent also spoke to Howard Lytle about the role his father had played in the war. From that conversation and the subsequent write up in The Photographic History the story of Lytle as "camera spy for the Confederacy" was born. Other than this tale, told fifty years after the fact to a journalist, there is no record any espionage by Lytle. The photographic equipment of the time, including that used by Lytle, involved bulky cameras and large, heavy tripods. The cameras used wet-plate collodion glass-plate negatives with fairly long exposure times. Photographing in the field, a photographer needed a darkroom wagon nearby for preparing the wet plates for exposure and developing them after exposure before they dried. Without a darkroom wagon, a photographer would have required a system of runners or horsemen to relay the wet plates between his studio, the photographic site in the field, and back to his studio.

=== Robert M. Smith ===
Confederate Lieutenant Robert M. Smith was captured and imprisoned at Johnson's Island, Ohio. He is unique in that he was able to secretly construct a wet-plate camera using a pine box, pocket knife, tin can, and spyglass lens. Smith acquired chemicals from the prison hospital to use for the photographic process. He used the camera clandestinely to photograph other prisoners at the gable end of the attic of cell block four. No other prison had an on-site photographer providing images for the imprisoned to send home. His contribution is well presented in David R. Bush's I Fear I Shall Never Leave This Island: Life in a Civil War Prison (2011).

== Itinerant photographers ==
Itinerant (traveling) photographers received permission from a commanding general to establish themselves within an encampment, primarily for the lucrative purpose of making portraits for the soldiers, which could then be sent to loved ones as a memento.

== Taxes ==
In September 1862, Northern photographic studios were required to purchase an annual license. By August 1864, photographers would have to buy revenue stamps as well. The "Sun Picture" tax on photographs was instituted by the Office of Internal Revenue as a means to help finance the war. The tax was either 1¢, 2¢, 3¢, or 5¢, depending on the price of the photo (1–10¢, 10–25¢, 25–50¢, 50–$1 respectively). However, there was not a special stamp created for photography, so, US revenue stamps originally intended for Bank Checks, Playing Cards, Certificates, Proprietary, Bills of Lading, &c. were used. Largely due to the lobbying efforts of Alexander Gardner, Mathew Brady, Jeremiah Gurney and Charles D. Fredericks, the tax was repealed in 1866.

== Copyright ==
In 1854, James Ambrose Cutting and his partner, Isaac A. Rehn, took out three patents that were "improvements" in the wet-plate collodion process. Cutting developed a method for adhering the two pieces of glass together using Canada balsam. Though meant as a way to hermetically seal the ambrotypes as a preservation method, the process was ultimately unnecessary as the varnish layer itself worked extremely well as a protectant. In fact, ambrotypes that utilized Cutting's patent are known to exhibit deterioration caused by the technique. Numerous high-profile lawsuits (E. Anthony, J. Gurney, C.D. Fredericks, J. Bogardus) and disputes surrounding the patents may have had an intimidating effect, and discouraged a wider use of "instantaneous" (stop action) photography during the Civil War. Cutting's patented formula featured the chemical component, bromide of potassium, which greatly enhanced the sensitivity of the collodion. When the patent extensions came up for renewal in 1868, the Patent Office decided that the original patents should not have been issued, and the extension was denied. The decision was partly based on evidence found in Henry Snelling's book, "The History and Practice of Photography." Snelling in 1853 had described the use of the same key ingredients found in Cutting's high-speed, emulsion.

Another widespread concern of 19th century photographers was the lack of copyright protection, something the Philadelphia Photographer termed "piratical stealing". In 1870 H.R. 1714 was passed by the 41st Congress. The interpolations made in the new law were due primarily to the influence of Alexander Gardner.

== Legacy ==
The results of the efforts of all Civil War photographers can be seen in almost all of the history texts of the conflict. In terms of photography, the American Civil War is the best covered conflict of the 19th century. It presaged the development of the wartime photojournalism of World War II, the Korean War, and the Vietnam War.

The number of Civil War photographs that are available contrasts sharply with the scarcity of pictures from subsequent conflicts such as the Russian wars in Central Asia, the Franco-Prussian War, and the various colonial wars before the Boer War.

== Photographer portraits ==
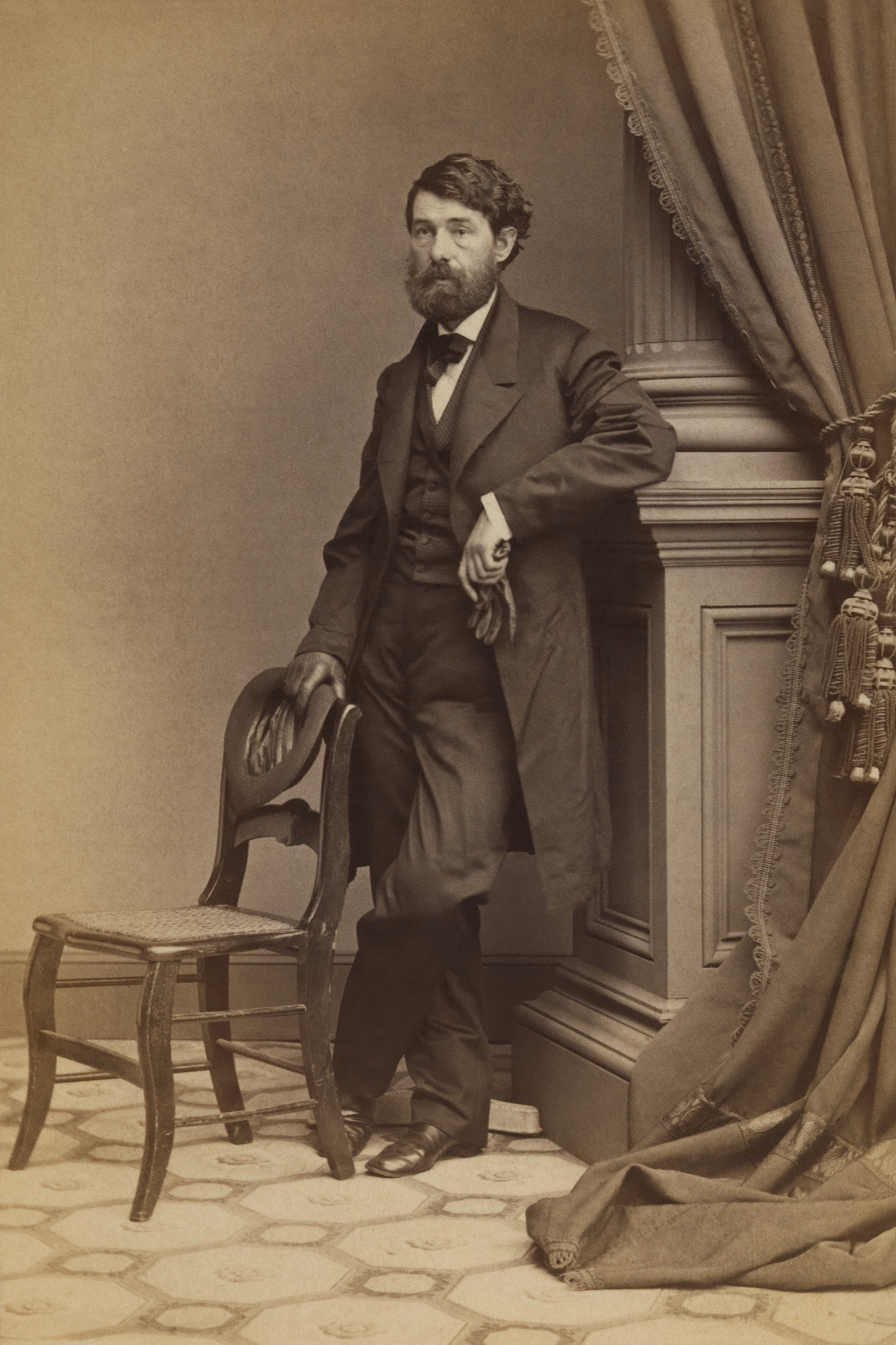
George Norman Barnard, c.1866

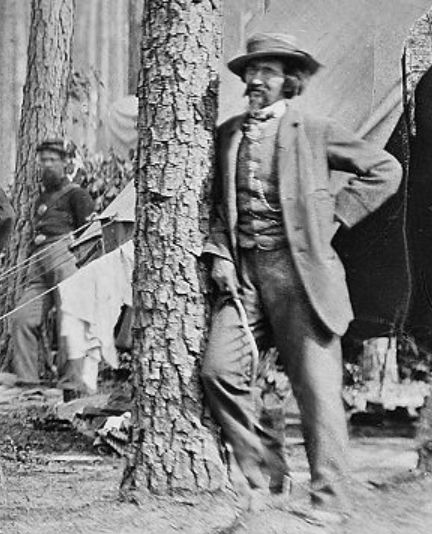
Mathew B. Brady, 1864

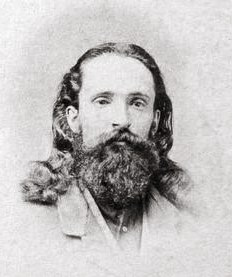
William Frank Browne self portrait 1863

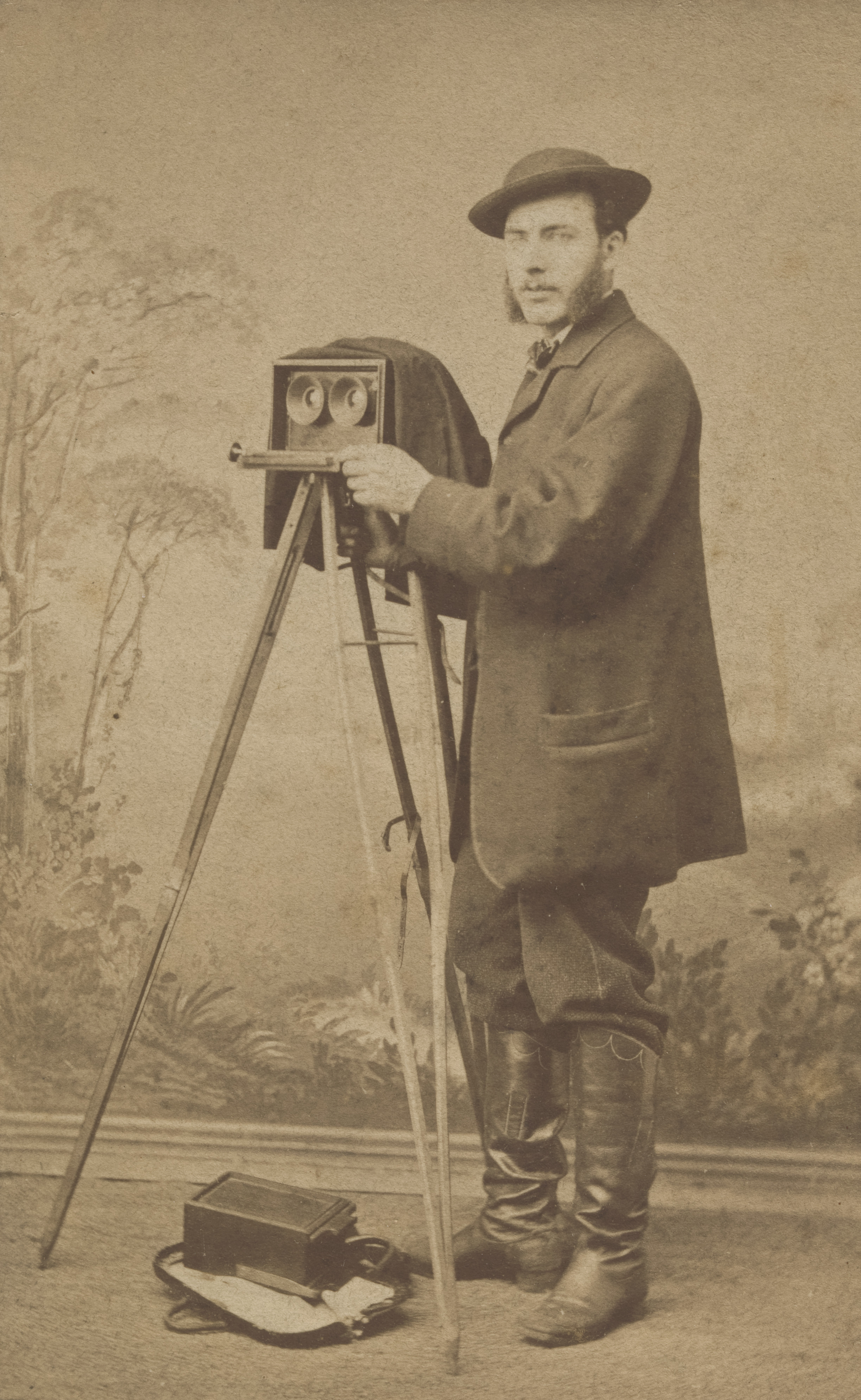
John Carbutt, 1865

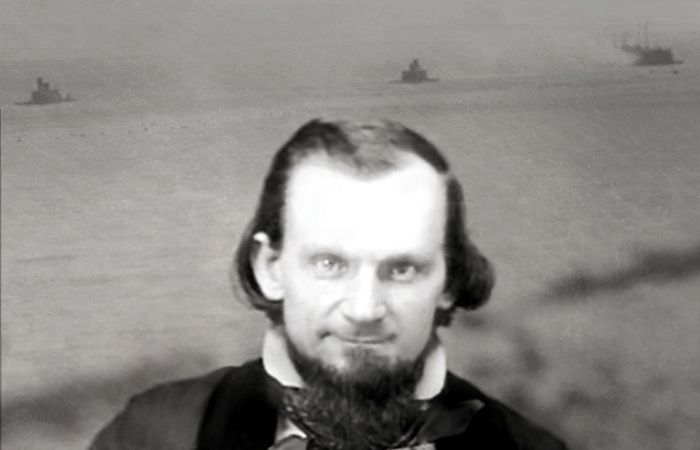
George Smith Cook, c.1856

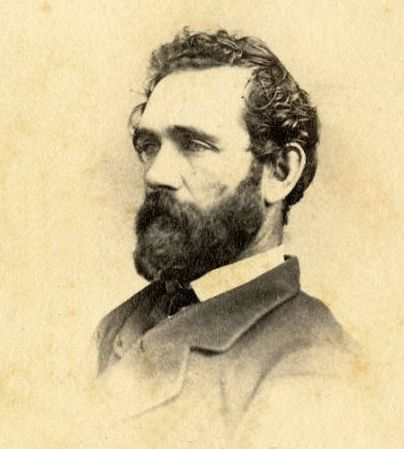
Samuel Abbot Cooley, c.1864

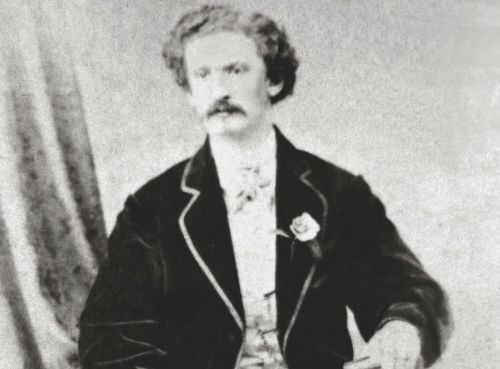
Jacob Frank Coonley c. 1865

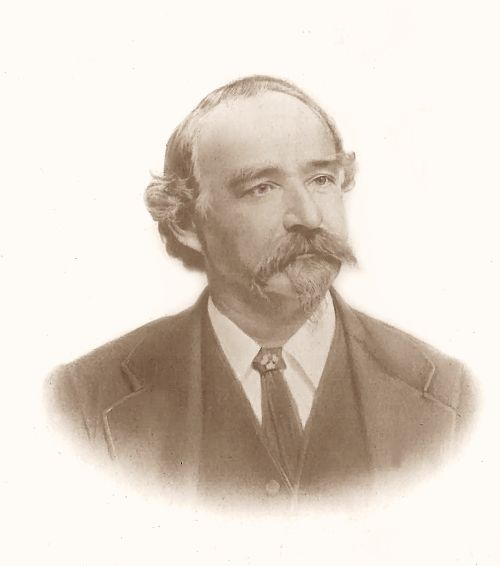
Frederick Eugene Durbec c. 1902

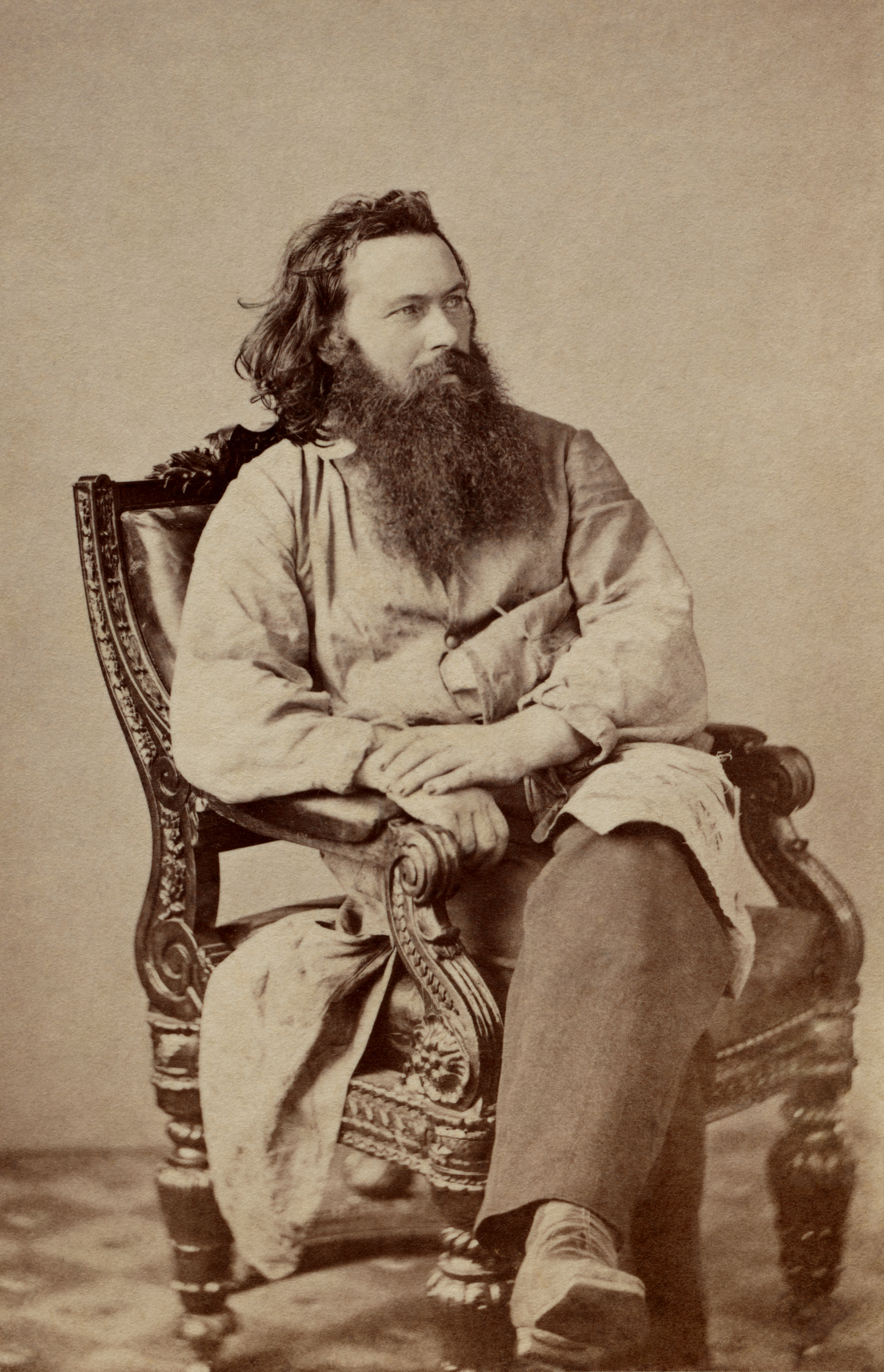
Alexander Gardner, 1863

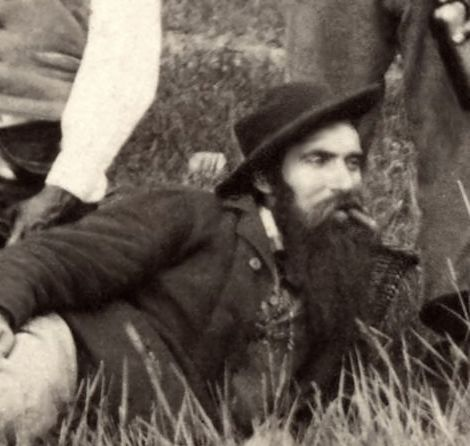
James Gardner June 11, 1865

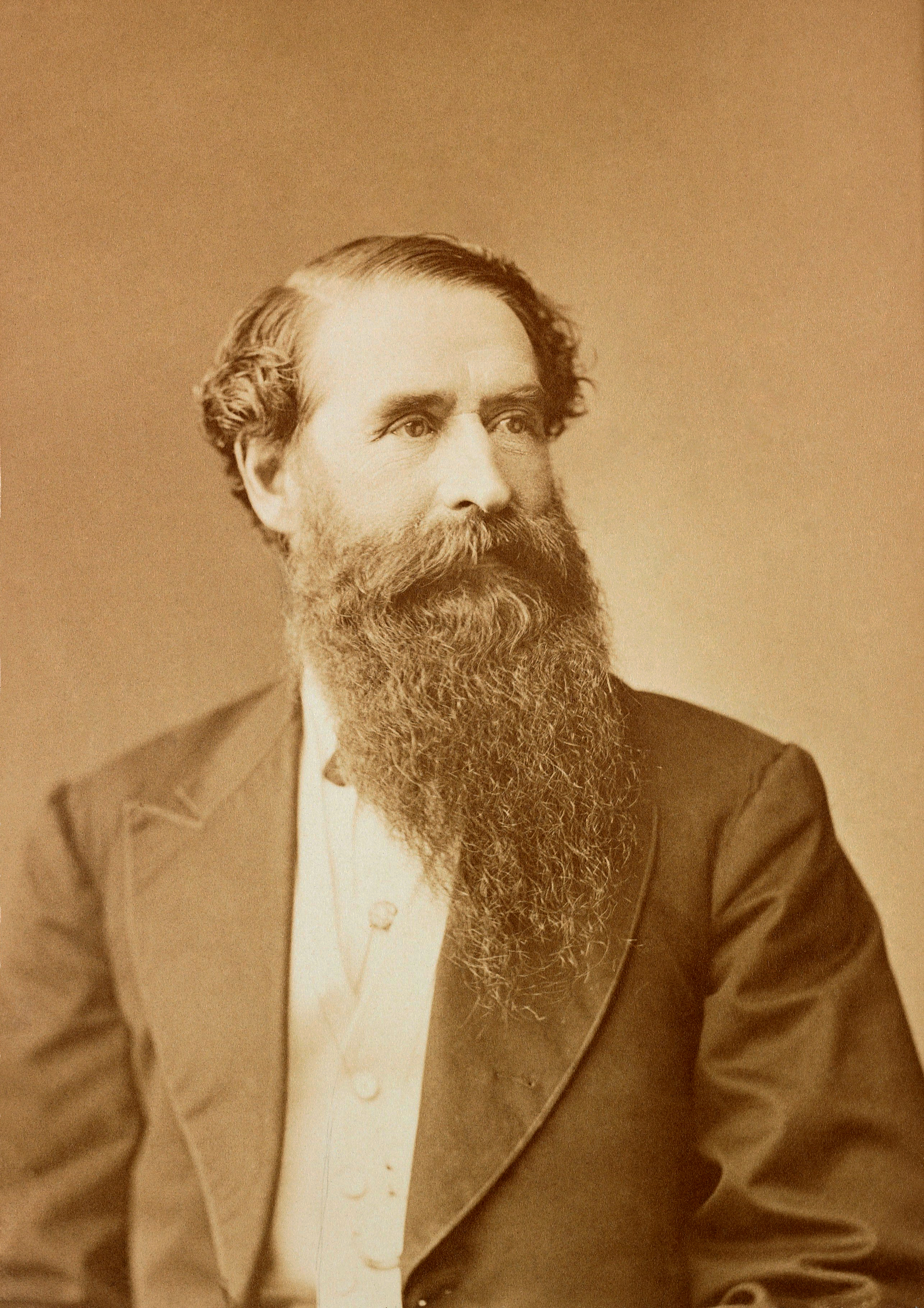
Jeremiah Gurney, c.1869

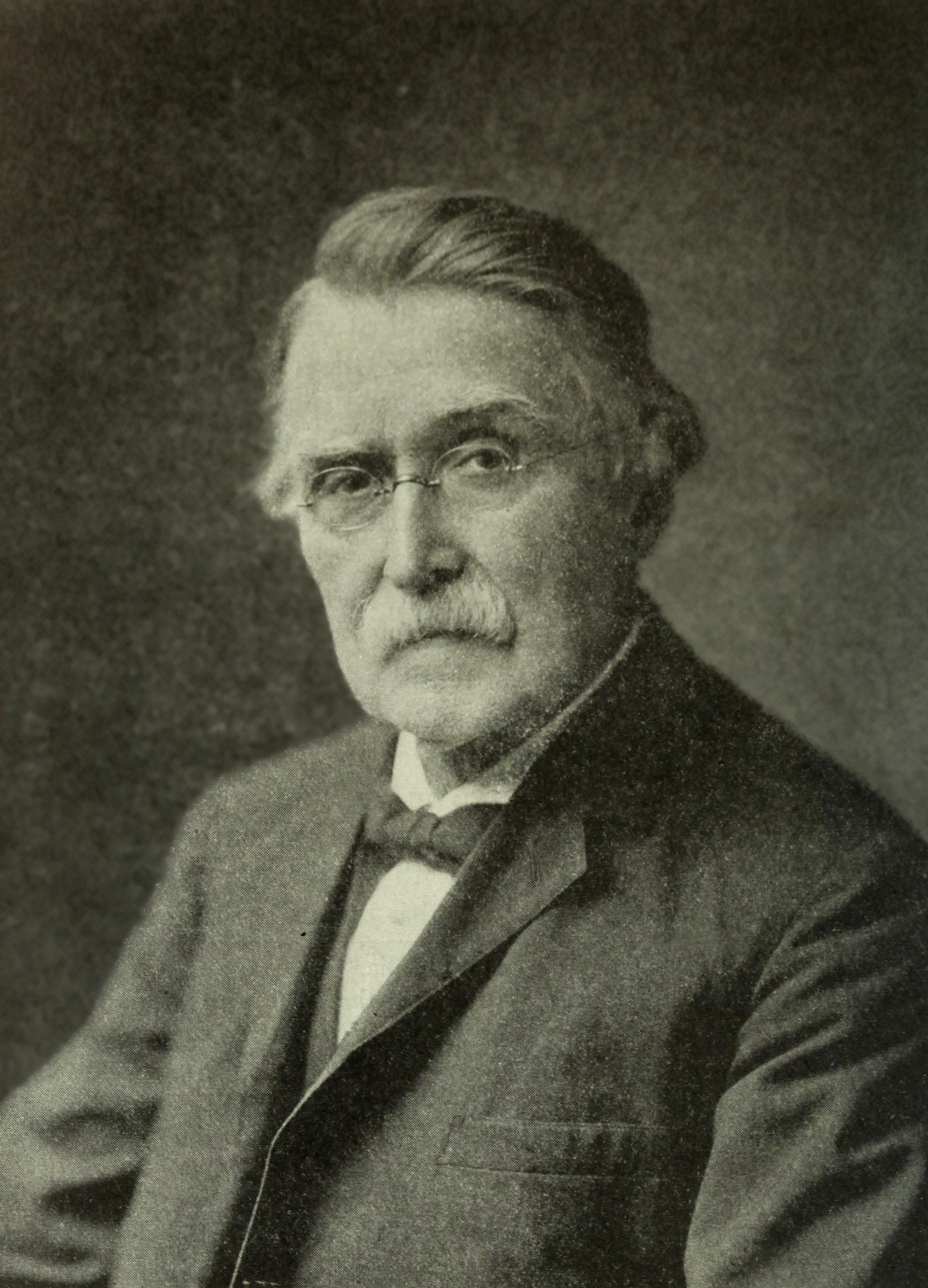
Frederick Gutekunst, c.1900

David Knox, Nov. 1865

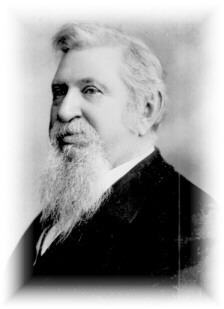
Andrew David Lytle, c.1902

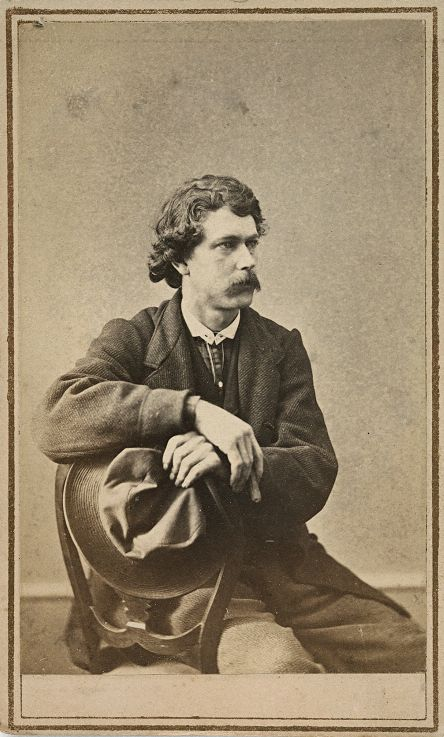
Timothy H. O'Sullivan, c.1864

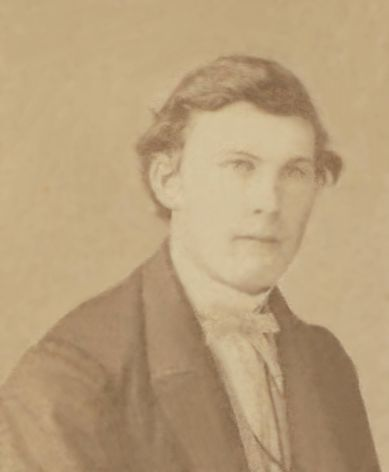
William Redish Pywell, c.1862

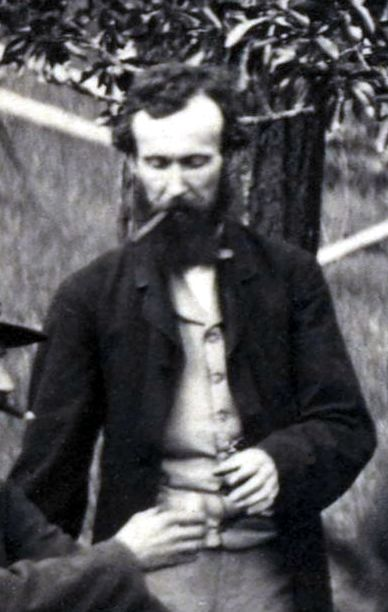
John Reekie, June 1865

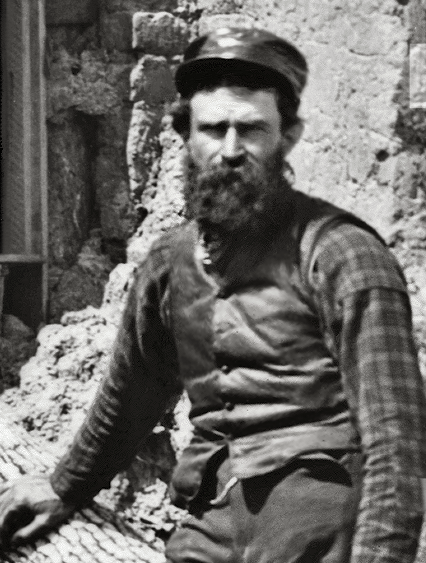
Thomas C. Roche, April 1865

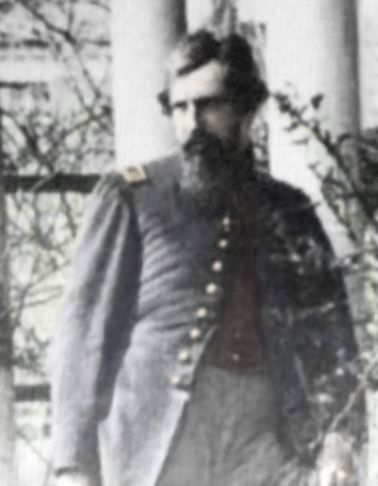
Andrew Joseph Russell, 1863

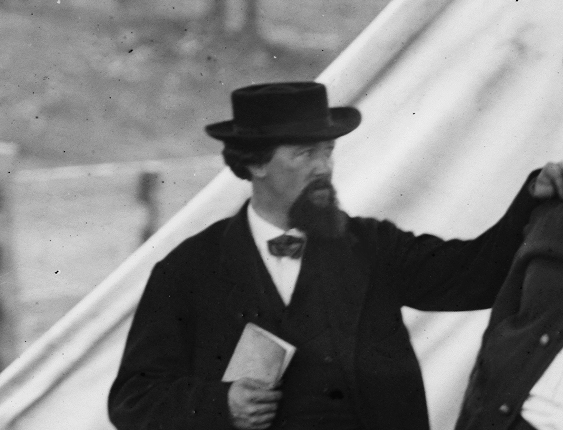
William Morris Smith, July 1865

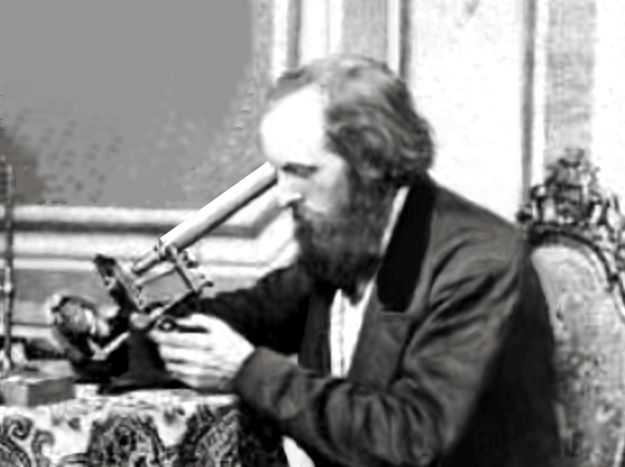
George Stacy, c.1864

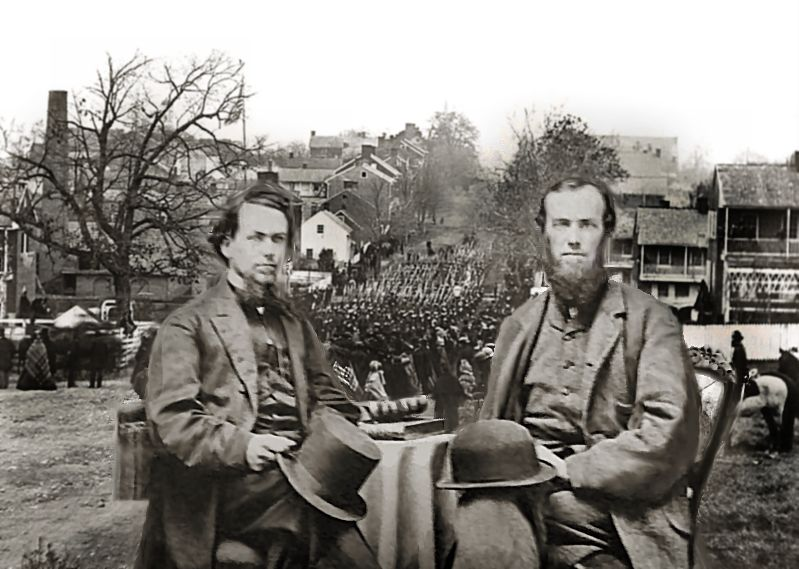
Isaac & Charles Tyson, c.1863

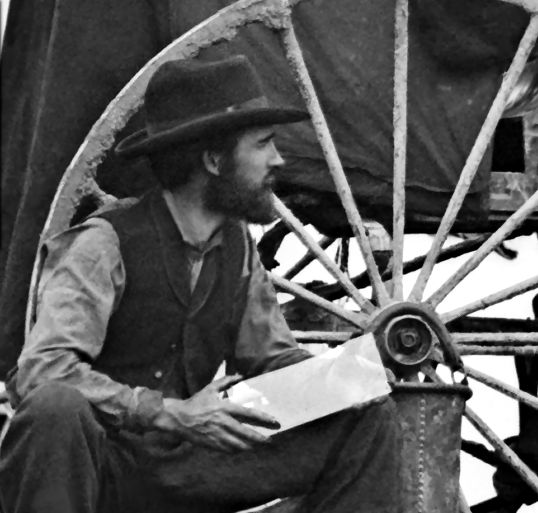
David B. Woodbury, July 1864

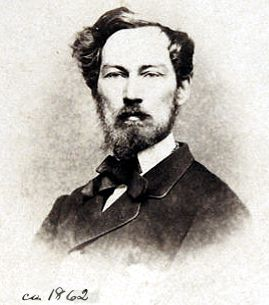
Edward Thompkins Whitney, c.1862

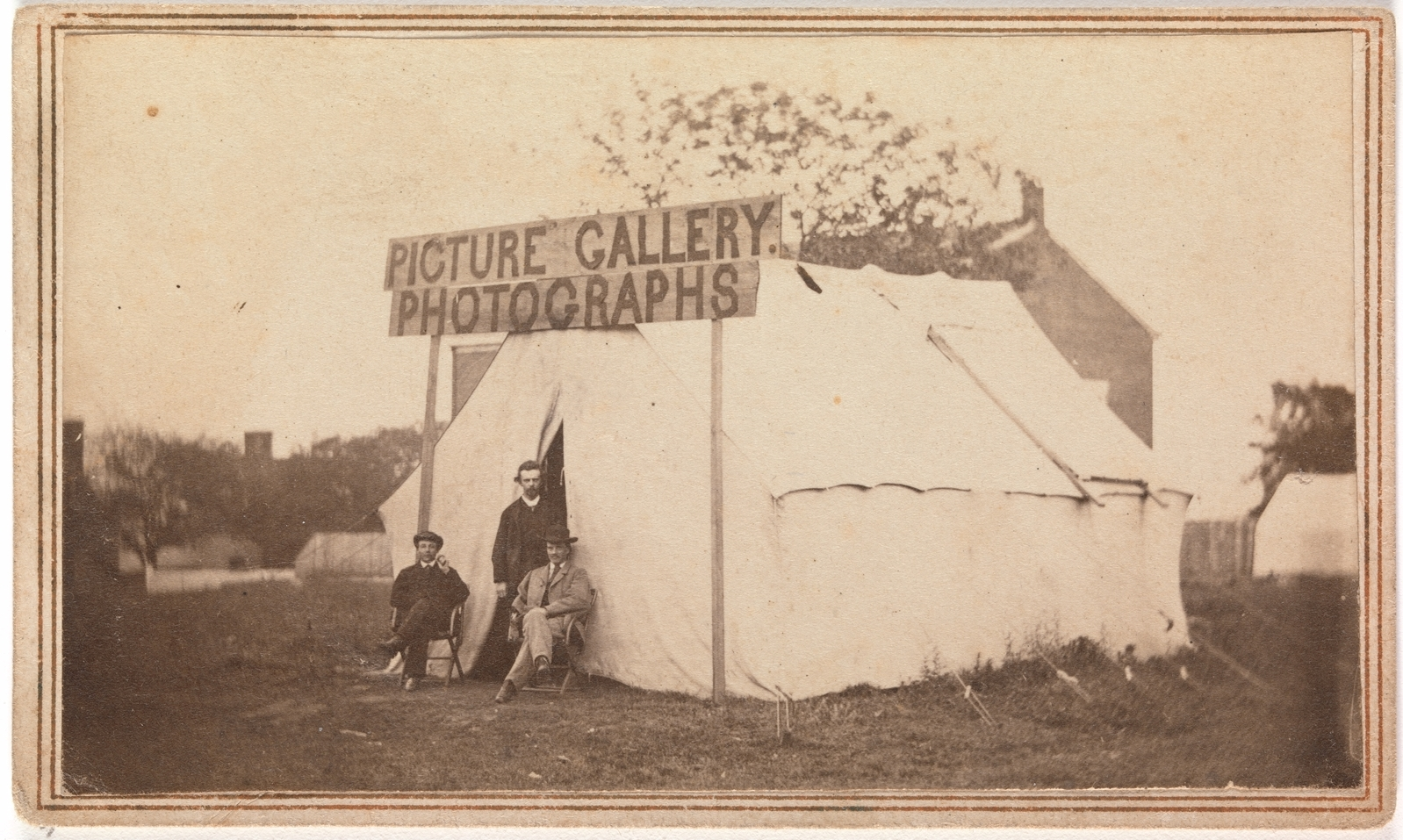
Hundreds of photographers provided field photo services during the Civil War

== See also ==
- Early Panoramic photography
- Julian Vannerson
- Albumen print
- Daguerreotype
- Calotype
- Ambrotype
- Tintype
- The Photographic History of the Civil War (1911 book series)

== Literature ==
- Bob Zeller. The Blue and Gray in Black and White: A History of Civil War Photography. Bloomsbury, Westport, ISBN 0-27598243-2.
- Jeff L. Rosenheim: Photography and the American Civil War. Metropolitan Museum of Art, New York 2013, ISBN 978-0-300-19180-6.
- Sullivan, Robert (2024). Double Exposure: Resurveying the West with Timothy O'Sullivan, America's Most Mysterious War Photographer. New York: Farrar, Straus and Giroux. ISBN 978-0374151164.
- Scott Hippensteel: Civil War Photo Forensics. University of Tennessee Press, Knoxville 2026, ISBN 979-8-89527-087-5.
