= George Cooke =

George Cooke may refer to:

== Arts and entertainment ==
- George Frederick Cooke (1756–1812), English actor
- George Cooke (engraver) (1781–1834), British engraver
- George Cooke (painter) (1793–1849), American painter
- George Cooke (actor, 1807–1863), English actor

== Law and politics ==
- George Cooke (Massachusetts politician) (died 1652), American colonial politician
- George Cooke (deputy governor) (fl. 1689–1690), British deputy governor of Bombay
- George Cooke (died 1768), British politician
- George Atwell Cooke (1848–1890), Canadian politician
- George Cooke (Australian politician) (1869–1938)
- George A. Cooke (1869–1938), American jurist in Illinois

== Sports ==
- George Cooke (cricketer) (1826–1862), English cricketer
- George Edwin Cooke (1883–1969), American soccer player
- George Cooke (footballer) (1899–1977), English footballer
- George Cooke (rower) (1906–1941), New Zealand rower

== Others ==
- George Cooke (British Army officer) (1768–1837)
- George Leigh Cooke (c. 1779–1853), English mathematician and priest
- George Wingrove Cooke (1814–1865), British historian
- George Willis Cooke (1848–1923), American Unitarian minister
- George Albert Cooke (1865–1939), British Anglican clergyman
- George W. Cooke (1916–1992), British chemist

== See also ==
- George Coke (1570–1646), or Cooke, English bishop
- George Cook (disambiguation)
