= George Cook =

George Cook may refer to:

- George Cook (footballer, born 1895) (1895–1980), English professional footballer
- George Cook (footballer, born 1904) (1904–after 1932), English professional footballer
- George Cook (moderator 1825) (1772–1845), Scottish minister
- George Cook (moderator 1876) (1812–1888), Scottish minister
- George Cook (opera singer) (1925–1995), English opera singer
- George Cook (Australian rugby league player) (fl. 1940s), Australian rugby league footballer
- George Cook (New Zealand rugby player) (1889–1918), New Zealand rugby union and rugby league player
- George Cram Cook (1873–1924), American writer
- George Hammell Cook (1818–1889), State Geologist of New Jersey and vice president of Rutgers College
- George Ramsay Cook (1931–2016), Canadian historian
- George S. Cook (1819–1902), American photographer
- George W. Cook (1851–1916), U.S. Representative from Colorado
- George W. F. Cook (1919–2009), Vermont attorney and politician
- George William Cook (1855–1931), educator at Howard University
- George LaGrange Cook (1849–1919), photographer in Charleston, South Carolina

== See also ==
- George Cooke (disambiguation)
