= Mathew Brady =

American photographer (1822–1896)

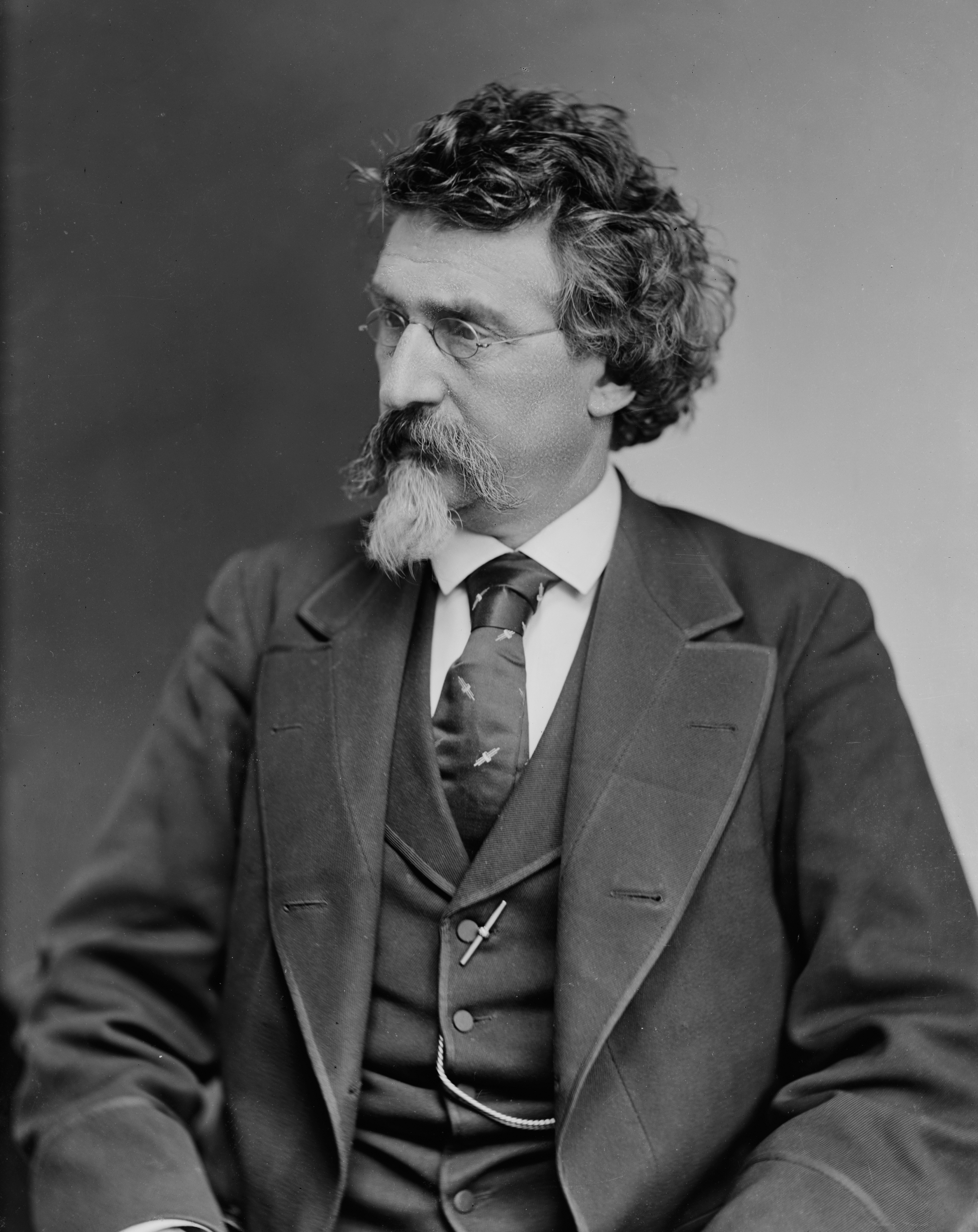
- Brady, c. 1875
- Born: Mathew B. Brady c. May 18, 1822; Warren County, New York, U.S.
- Died: January 15, 1896 (aged 73); New York City, U.S.
- Resting place: Congressional Cemetery, Washington, D.C.
- Occupations: Photographer; photojournalist
- Years active: 1844−1875
- Spouse: Juliet Handy (m. 1850; died 1887)
- Relatives: Levin Corbin Handy (nephew by marriage)

Mathew B. Brady (c. May 18, 1822 – January 15, 1896) was an American photographer. Known as one of the earliest and most famous photographers in American history, he is best known for his scenes of the American Civil War. He studied under inventor Samuel Morse, who pioneered the daguerreotype technique in America. Brady opened his own studio in New York City in 1844, and went on to photograph U.S. presidents John Quincy Adams, Abraham Lincoln, Millard Fillmore, Martin Van Buren, and other public figures.

When the Civil War began, Brady's use of a mobile studio and darkroom enabled thousands of vivid battlefield photographs to bring home the reality of war to the public. He also photographed generals and politicians on both sides of the conflict, though most of these were taken by his assistants rather than by Brady himself.

After the end of the Civil War, these pictures went out of fashion, and the government did not purchase the master copies as he had anticipated. Brady's fortunes declined sharply, and he died in debt.

== Early life ==
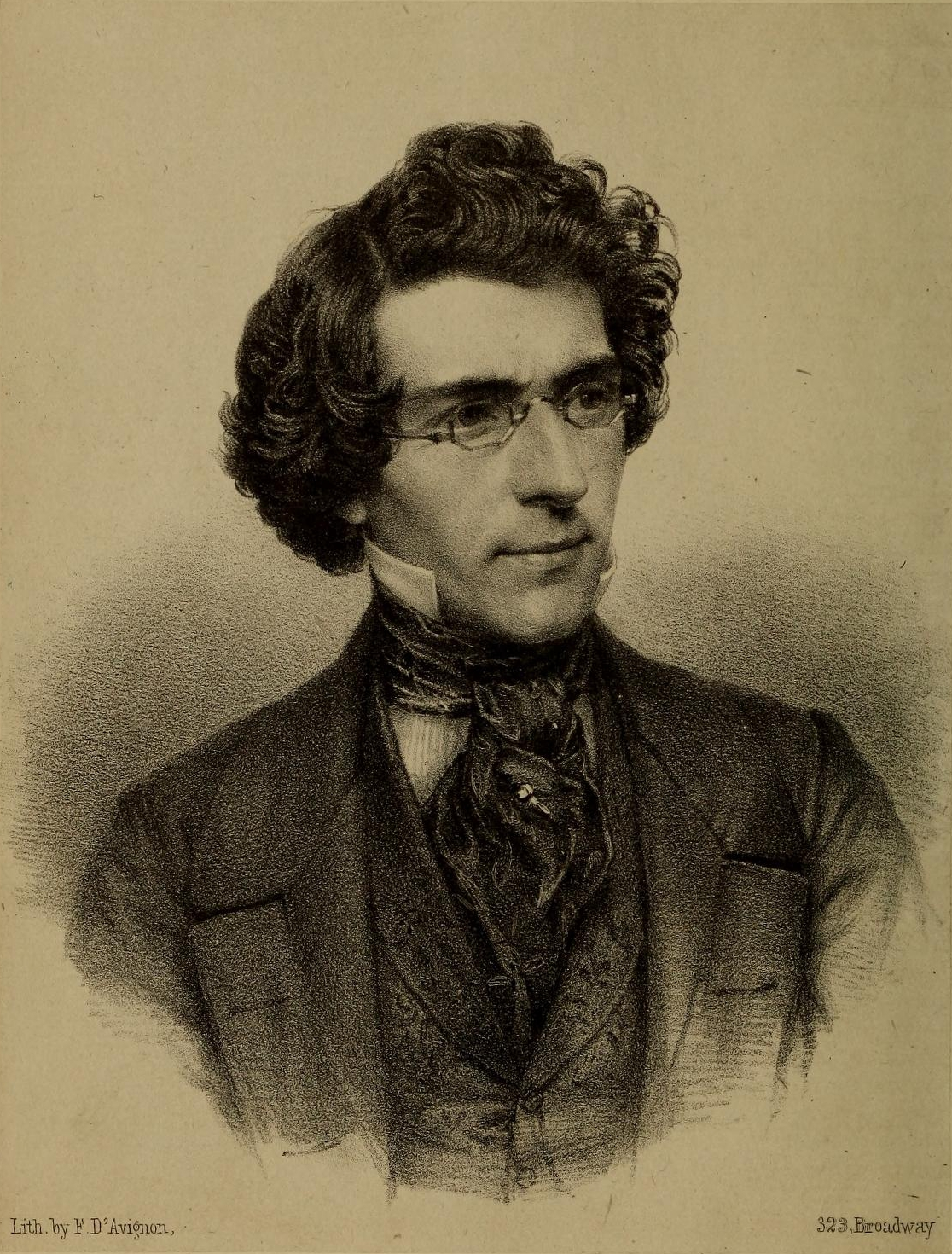
Lithograph of Brady, c. 1845

Brady left little record of his life before photography. Speaking to the press in the last years of his life, he stated that he was born between 1822 and 1824 in Warren County, New York, near Lake George. He was the youngest of three children to Irish immigrant parents, Andrew and Samantha Julia Brady. In official documents before and during the American Civil War, however, he claimed to have been born in Ireland.

== Career ==
At the age of 16, Brady moved to Saratoga, New York, where he met portrait painter William Page and became Page's student. In 1839, the two traveled to Albany, and then to New York City, where Brady continued to study painting with Page and with Samuel Morse, Page's former teacher. Morse had met Louis Jacques Daguerre in France in 1839, and returned to the US to enthusiastically push the new daguerreotype invention of capturing images. At first, Brady's involvement was limited to manufacturing leather cases that held daguerreotypes. But soon he became the center of the New York artistic colony that wished to study photography. Morse opened a studio and offered classes; Brady was one of the first students.

In 1844, Brady opened his own photography studio at the corner of Broadway and Fulton Street in New York, and by 1845, he began to exhibit his portraits of famous Americans, including the likes of Senator Daniel Webster and writer Edgar Allan Poe. In 1849, he opened a studio at 625 Pennsylvania Avenue in Washington, D.C., where he met Juliet (whom everybody called 'Julia') Handy, whom he married in 1850 and lived with on Staten Island. Brady's early images were daguerreotypes, and he won many awards for his work; in the 1850s, ambrotype photography became popular, which gave way to the albumen print, a paper photograph produced from large glass negatives most commonly used in the Civil War photography.

In 1850, Brady produced The Gallery of Illustrious Americans, a portrait collection of prominent contemporary figures. The album, which featured noteworthy images including the elderly Andrew Jackson at the Hermitage, was not financially rewarding but invited increased attention to Brady's work and artistry. In 1854, Parisian photographer André-Adolphe-Eugène Disdéri popularized the carte de visite, and these small pictures (the size of a visiting card) rapidly became a popular novelty; thousands were created and sold in the United States and Europe.

In 1856, Brady placed an ad in the New York Herald offering to produce "photographs, ambrotypes and daguerreotypes." This inventive ad pioneered, in the US, the use of typeface and fonts that were distinct from the text of the publication and from that of other advertisements.

=== Civil War documentation ===
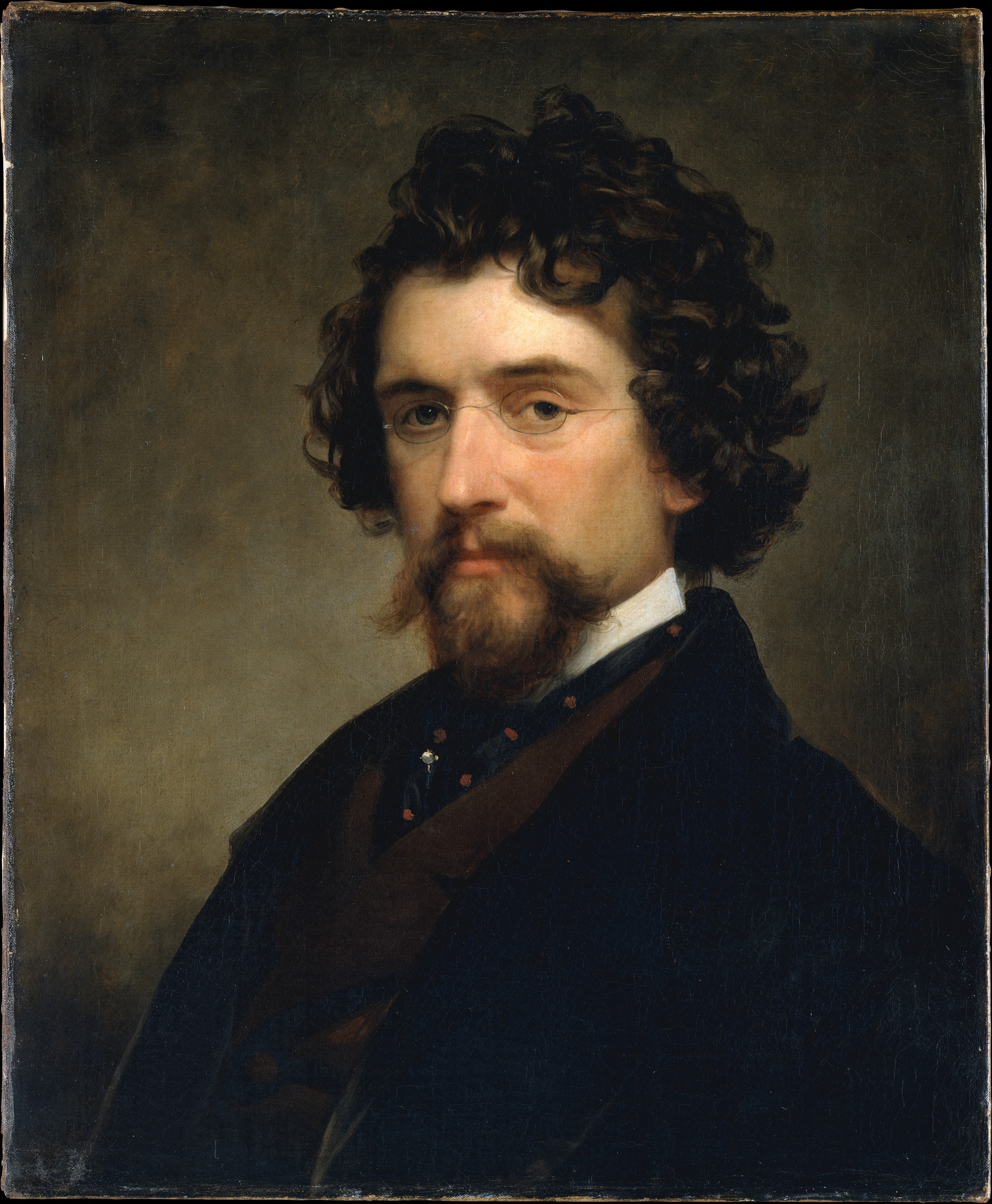
An 1857 portrait of Brady by Charles Loring Elliott

Brady upon his return from the First Battle of Bull Run in Manassas; under his long coat, he is wearing a saber awarded to him by the New York Fire Zouaves.

At first, the effect of the Civil War on Brady's business was a brisk increase in sales of cartes de visite to departing soldiers. Brady marketed to parents the idea of capturing their young soldiers' images before they might be lost to war by running an ad in the New-York Daily Tribune that warned, "You cannot tell how soon it may be too late." However, he was soon taken with the idea of documenting the war itself. He first applied to an old friend, General Winfield Scott, for permission to have his photographers travel to the battle sites, and eventually he made his application to President Lincoln himself. Lincoln granted permission in 1861, with the provision that Brady finance the project himself.

His efforts to document the Civil War on a grand scale by bringing his photographic studio onto the battlefields earned Brady his place in history. Despite the dangers, financial risk, and discouragement by his friends, Brady was later quoted as saying, "I had to go. A spirit in my feet said 'Go,' and I went." His first popular photographs of the conflict were at the First Battle of Bull Run, in which he got so close to the action that he barely avoided capture. While most of the time the battle had ceased before pictures were taken, Brady came under direct fire at Bull Run, Petersburg, and Fredericksburg.

He employed Alexander Gardner, James Gardner, Timothy H. O'Sullivan, William Pywell, George N. Barnard, Thomas C. Roche, and seventeen other men, each of whom was given a traveling darkroom, to go out and photograph scenes from the Civil War. Brady generally resided in Washington, D.C., where he organized his assistants and rarely visited battlefields personally. However, as author Roy Meredith points out, "He [Brady] was essentially the director. The actual operation of the camera though mechanical is important, but the selection of the scene to be photographed is as important, if not more so than just 'snapping the shutter.'"

This may have been due, at least in part, to the fact that Brady's eyesight had begun to deteriorate in the 1850s. Many of the images in Brady's collection are, in reality, thought to be the work of his assistants. Brady was criticized for failing to document the photographer, though it is unclear whether it was intentional or due simply to a lack of inclination to document the photographer of a specific image. Because so much of Brady's photography is missing information, it is difficult to know not only who took the picture, but also exactly when or where it was taken.

In October 1862, Brady opened an exhibition of photographs from the Battle of Antietam in his New York City gallery, titled The Dead of Antietam. Many images in this presentation were graphic photographs of corpses, a presentation new to America. This was the first time that many Americans saw the realities of war in photographs, as distinct from previous artists' impressions.

Through his many paid assistants, Brady took thousands of photos of Civil War scenes. Much of the popular understanding of the war comes from these photos. There are thousands of photos in the National Archives and the Library of Congress taken by Brady and his associates, Alexander Gardner, George Barnard and Timothy O'Sullivan. The photographs include Lincoln, General Ulysses S. Grant, and soldiers in camps and battlefields. The images provide a pictorial cross-reference of Civil War history. Brady was not able to photograph actual battle scenes, as the photographic equipment in those days was still in the infancy of its technical development and required that a subject be still for a clear photo to be produced.

=== Financial struggles and death ===
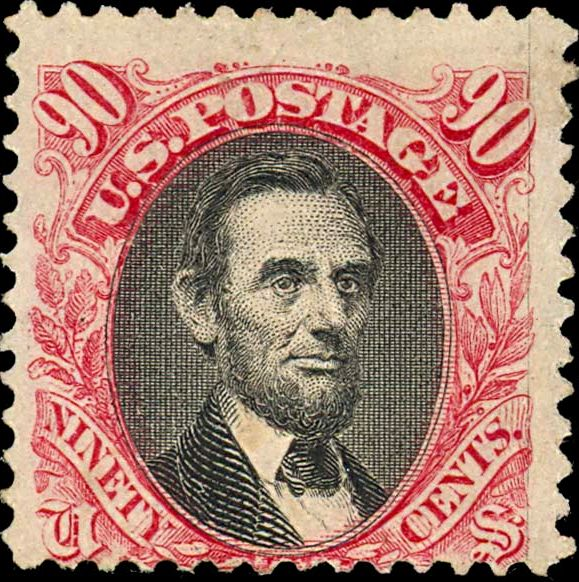
A U.S. postage stamp of U.S. president Abraham Lincoln based on Brady's portrait photo of Lincoln

During the war, Brady spent over $100,000 (about $1,981,889.57 in 2025) to create over 10,000 plates. He expected the U.S. government to buy the photographs when the Civil War ended. Despite a recommendation from Congress' Joint Committee on the Library, the government declined to do so and Brady was forced to sell his New York City studio and file for bankruptcy. Congress granted Brady $25,000 in 1875, but he remained deeply in debt. Unwilling to dwell on the gruesomeness of the Civil War after it ended, private collectors for Brady's works were scarce.

Depressed by his financial situation and loss of eyesight, and devastated by the death of his wife in 1887, Brady died penniless in the charity ward of Presbyterian Hospital in New York City on January 15, 1896, from complications from a streetcar accident. Brady's funeral was financed by veterans of the 7th New York Infantry, and he was buried in the Congressional Cemetery in Washington, D.C.

== Legacy ==
Brady photographed 18 of the 19 American presidents from John Quincy Adams to William McKinley. The exception was the ninth president, William Henry Harrison, who died in office three years before Brady started his photographic collection. Brady photographed Abraham Lincoln on many occasions. His Lincoln photographs have been used for the $5 bill and the Lincoln cent. One of his Lincoln photos was used by the National Bank Note Company as a model for the engraving on the 90-cent Lincoln Postage issue of 1869.

The thousands of photographs that Mathew Brady's photographers (such as Alexander Gardner and Timothy O'Sullivan) took have become the most important visual documentation of the Civil War, and have helped historians and the public better understand the era.

Brady photographed and made portraits of many senior Union officers in the war, including:

- Ulysses S. Grant
- Nathaniel Banks
- Don Carlos Buell
- Ambrose Burnside
- Benjamin Butler
- Joshua Chamberlain
- George Custer
- David Farragut
- John Gibbon
- Winfield Hancock
- Samuel P. Heintzelman
- Joseph Hooker
- Oliver Otis Howard
- David Hunter
- John A. Logan
- Irvin McDowell
- George McClellan
- Freeman McGilvery
- James McPherson
- George Meade
- Montgomery C. Meigs
- David Dixon Porter
- William Rosecrans
- John Schofield
- William Sherman
- Daniel Sickles
- Henry Warner Slocum
- George Stoneman
- Edwin V. Sumner
- George Thomas
- Emory Upton
- James Wadsworth
- Lew Wallace

Brady also photographed people on the Confederate side, including:

- Jefferson Davis
- P. G. T. Beauregard
- Stonewall Jackson
- Albert Pike
- James Longstreet
- James Henry Hammond
- Henry Hopkins Sibley
- Robert E. Lee

Brady also photographed Lord Lyons, the British ambassador to Washington during the Civil War.

=== Photojournalism and honors ===
Brady is credited with being the father of photojournalism. He can also be considered a pioneer in the orchestration of a "corporate credit line". In this practice, every image produced in his gallery was labeled "Photo by Brady"; however, Brady dealt directly with only the most distinguished subjects, and most portrait sessions were carried out by others.

As perhaps the best-known US photographer in the 19th century, it was Brady's name that came to be attached to the era's heavy, specialized end tables, which were factory-made specifically for use by portrait photographers. Such a "Brady stand" of the mid-19th century typically had a weighty cast iron base for stability, plus an adjustable-height single-column pipe leg for dual use as either a portrait model's armrest or (when fully extended and fitted with a brace attachment rather than the usual tabletop) as a neck rest. The latter was often needed to keep models steady during the longer exposure times of early photography. While Brady stand is a convenient term for these trade-specific articles of studio equipment, there is no proven connection between Brady himself and the Brady stand's invention c. 1855.

In 1968 Brady became one of the first two Americans named to the International Photography Hall of Fame and Museum.

=== Books and documentaries ===
Brady and his studio produced over 7,000 pictures (mostly two negatives of each). One set, "after undergoing extraordinary vicissitudes," came into U.S. government possession. His own negatives passed in the 1870s to E. & H. T. Anthony & Company of New York, in default of payment for photographic supplies. They "were kicked about from pillar to post" for 10 years, until John C. Taylor found them in an attic and bought them; from this they became "the backbone of the Ordway–Rand collection; and in 1895 Brady himself had no idea of what had become of them. Many were broken, lost, or destroyed by fire. After passing to various other owners, they were discovered and appreciated by Edward Bailey Eaton," who set in motion "events that led to their importance as the nucleus of a collection of Civil War photos published in 1912 as The Photographic History of the Civil War.

Some of the lost images are mentioned in the last episode of Ken Burns' 1990 documentary series The Civil War. Burns claims that glass plate negatives were often sold to gardeners, not for their images, but for the glass itself to be used in greenhouses and cold frames. In the years that followed the end of the war, the sun slowly burned away their filmy images, and they were lost.

The idea that many of the Civil War negatives perished by being used in greenhouses is probably a myth. This is also dispelled by the Civil War photo historian Bob Zeller. Practically all histories of Civil War photography omit the fact that most were taken in 3D and many were published as side-by-side 3D images. Zeller's book The Civil War in Depth reproduces many of these images the way they are supposed to be seen, instead of just half shown in 2D. Indeed, the picture of Brady in a straw hat shown in this article is reproduced as a stereoscopic side-by-side image on page 12 of The Civil War in Depth. Mathew Brady's photographers created many of the Civil War images, most of which were in 3D according to Zeller.

=== Exhibitions ===
On September 19, 1862, two days after the Battle of Antietam, the bloodiest day of combat on U.S. soil with more than 23,000 killed, wounded or missing, Brady sent photographer Alexander Gardner and his assistant James Gibson to photograph the carnage. In October 1862, Brady displayed the photos by Gardner at his New York gallery under the title "The Dead of Antietam". The New York Times published a review.

In October 2012, the National Museum of Civil War Medicine displayed 21 original Mathew Brady photographs from 1862 documenting the Battle of Antietam.

== Gallery and related images ==
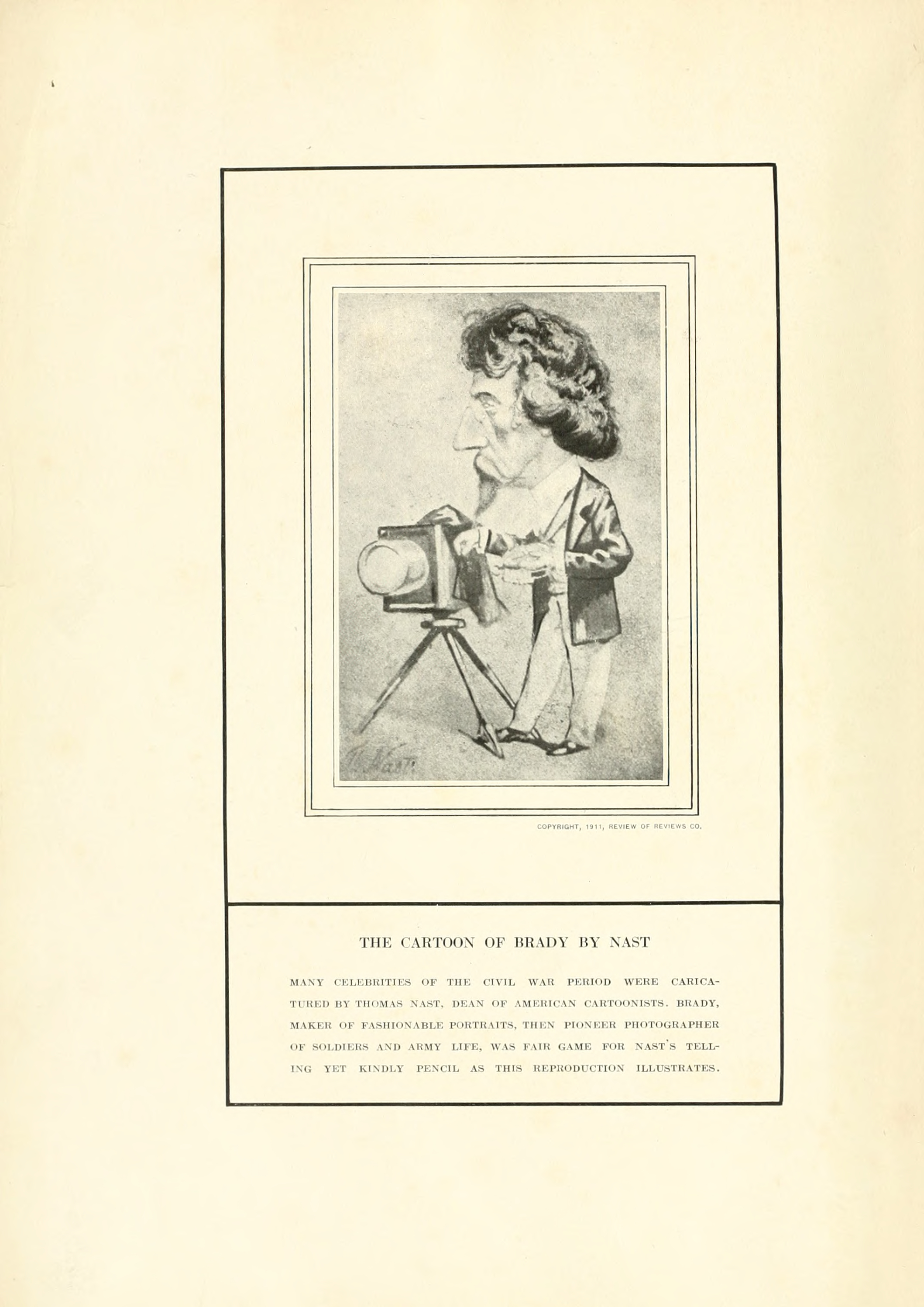
Thomas Nast cartoon of Brady at work

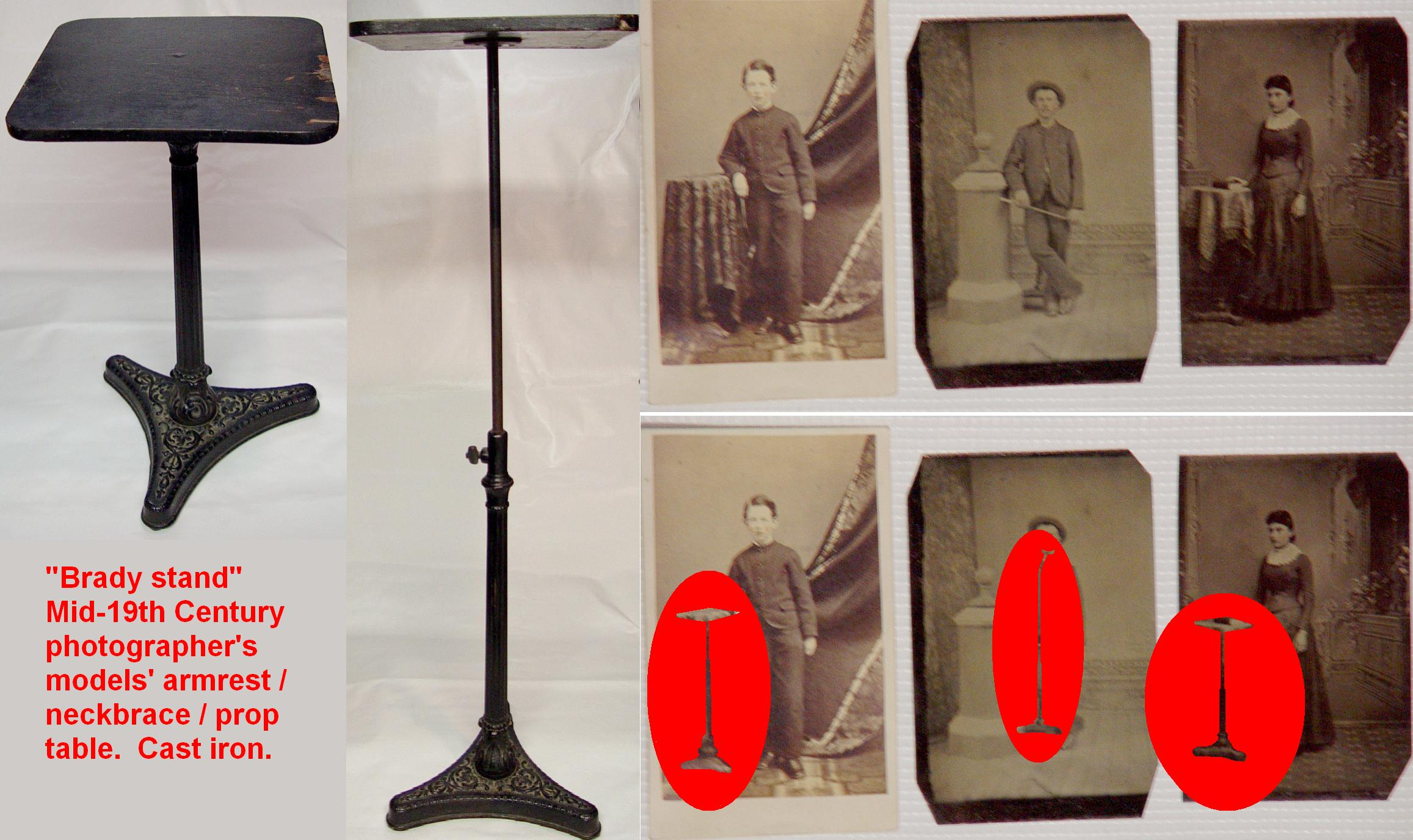
Mid-19th century "Brady stand" photo model's armrest table

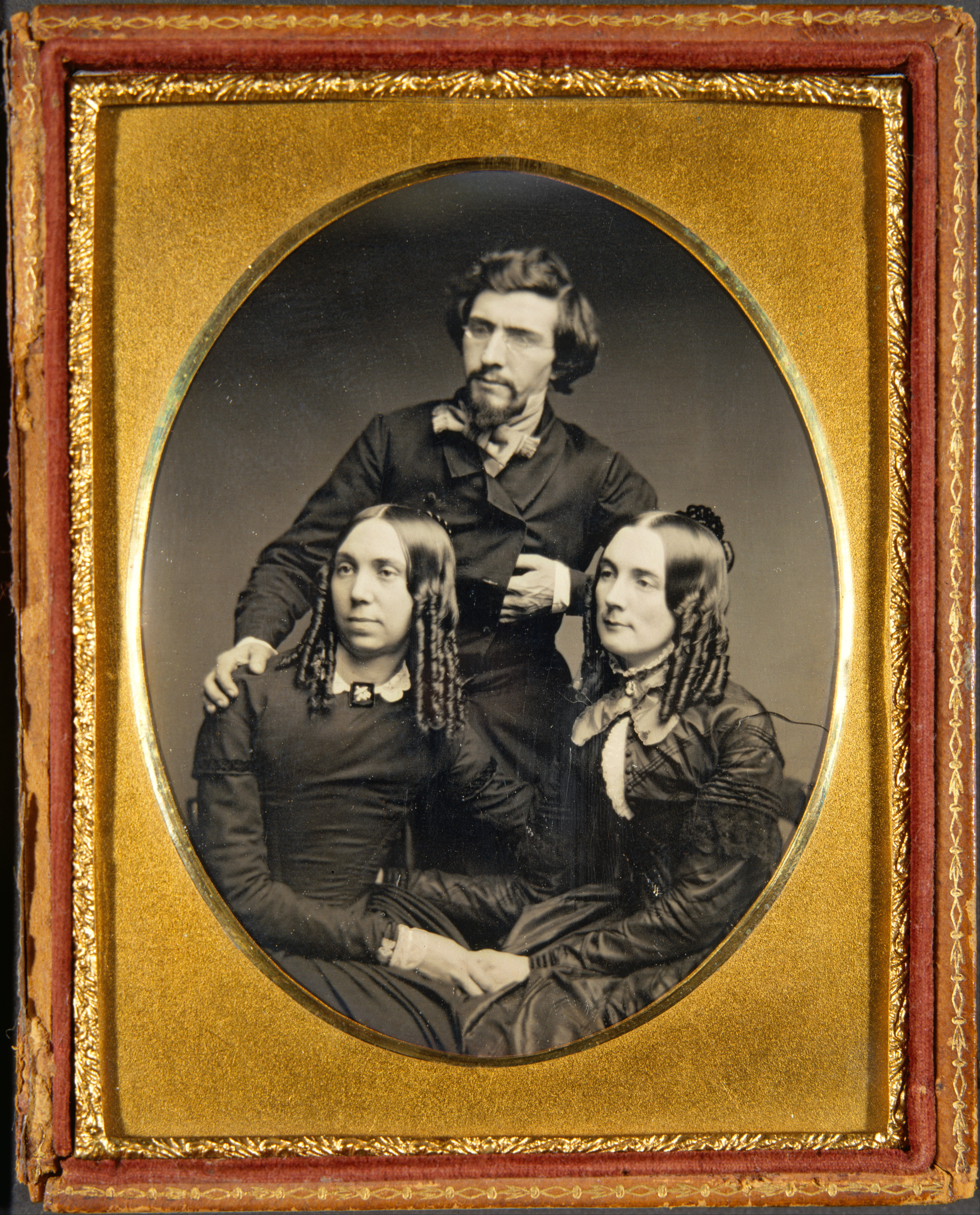
Brady with his wife Juliet Handy Brady (front left) and sister Ellen Brady Haggerty (front right)

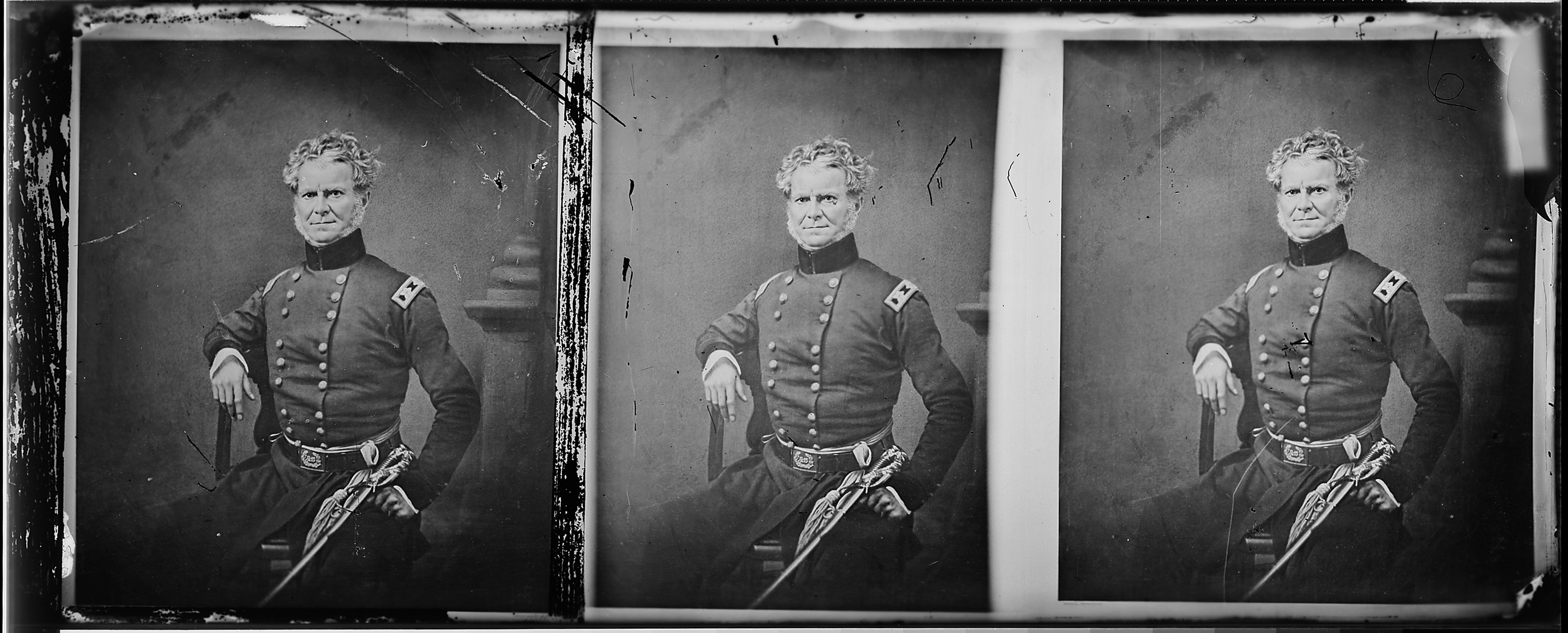
General William J. Worth; a related picture also by Brady can be found on the George Eastman House Collection website.

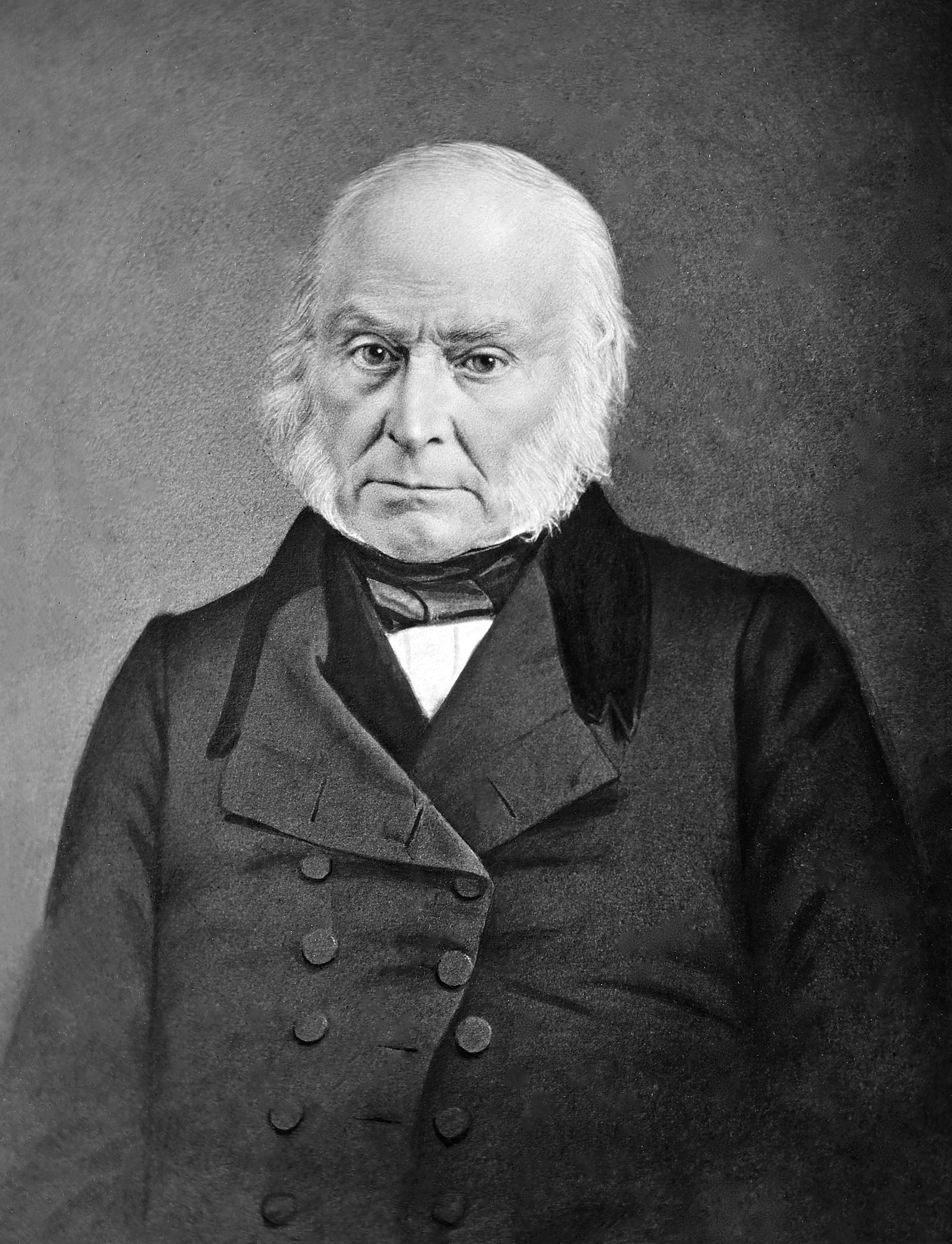
Photo of John Quincy Adams between 1843 and 1848 by Brady

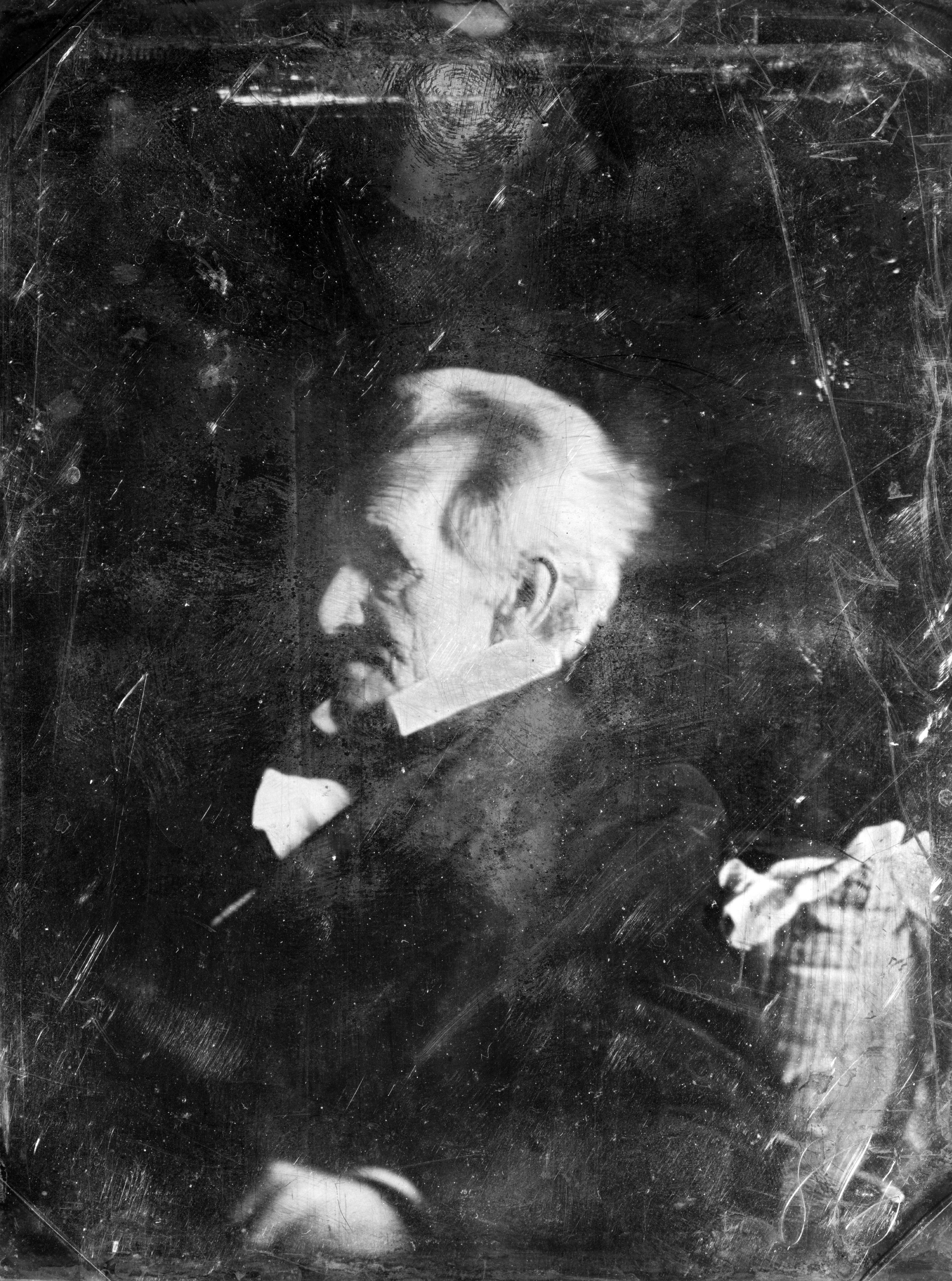
Photo of Andrew Jackson by Edward Anthony, later copied by Brady

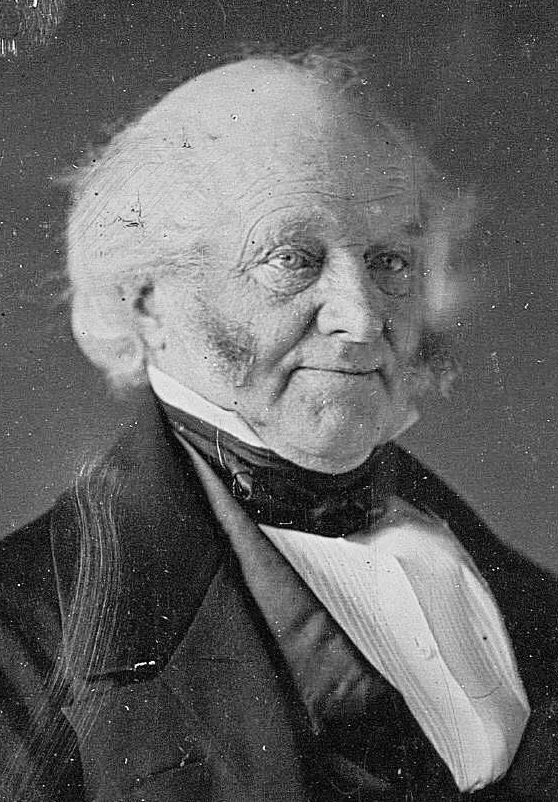
Photo of Martin Van Buren by Brady 1849

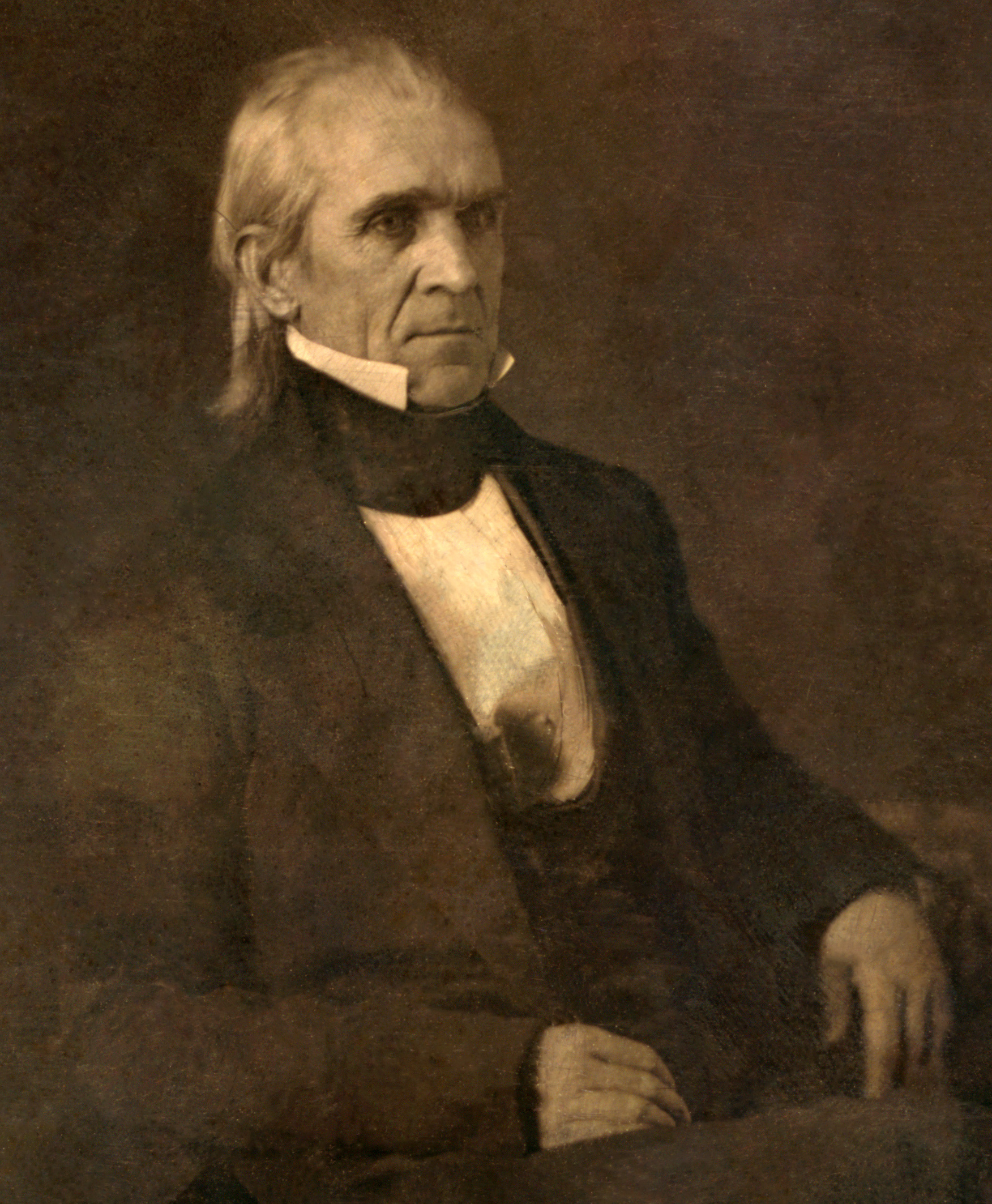
Photo of James K. Polk by Brady 1849

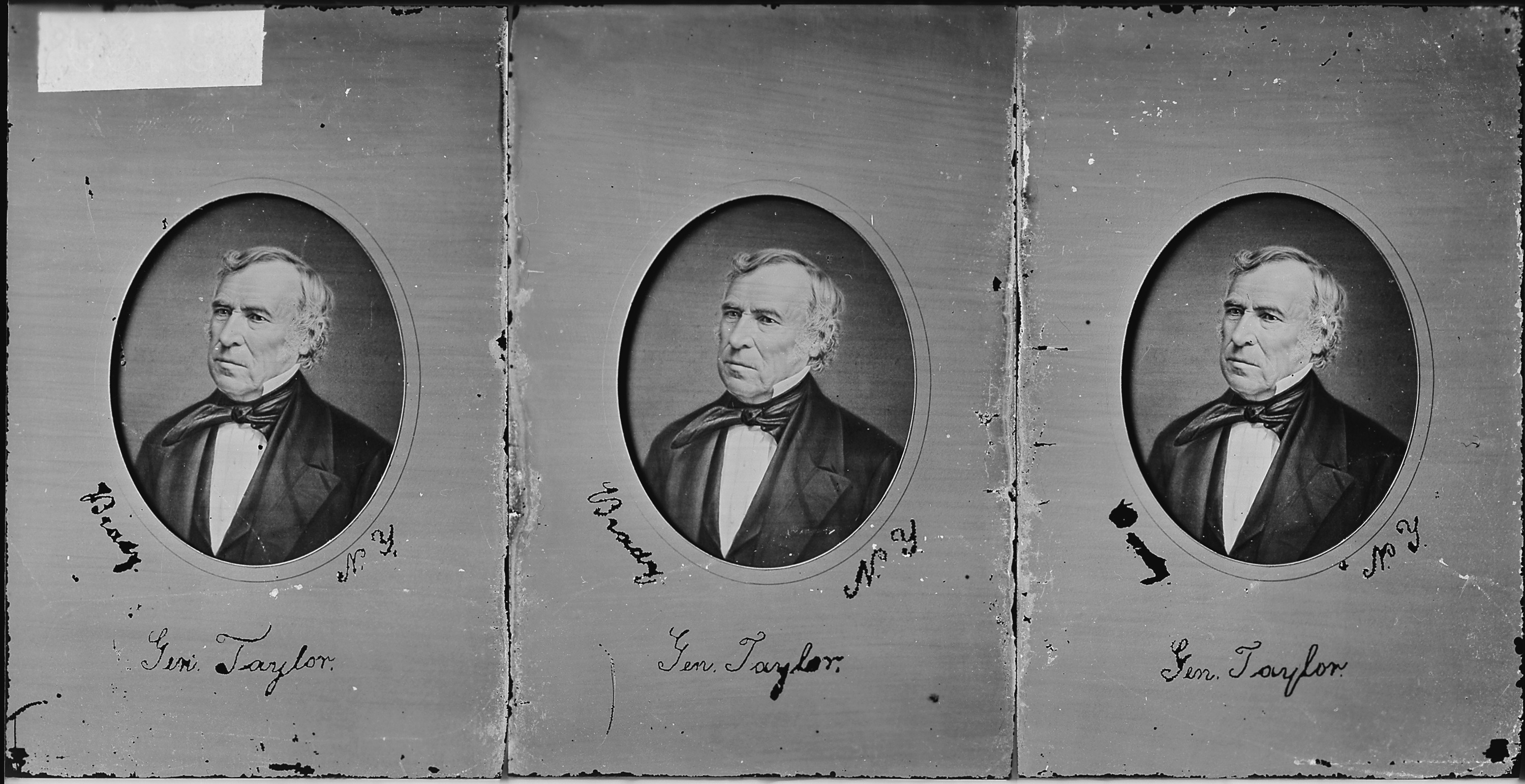
Photo of Zachary Taylor by Brady

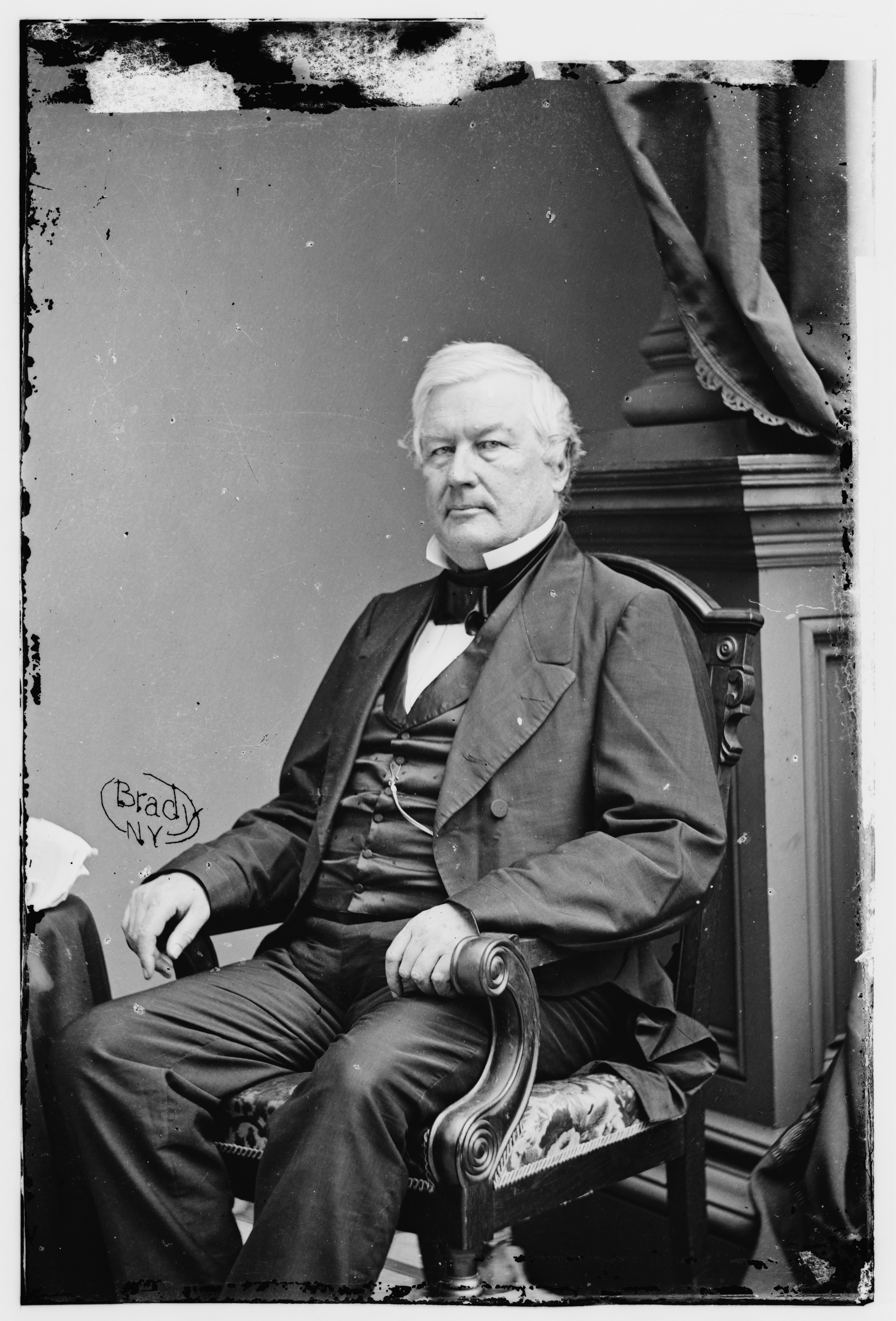
Photo of Millard Fillmore by Brady

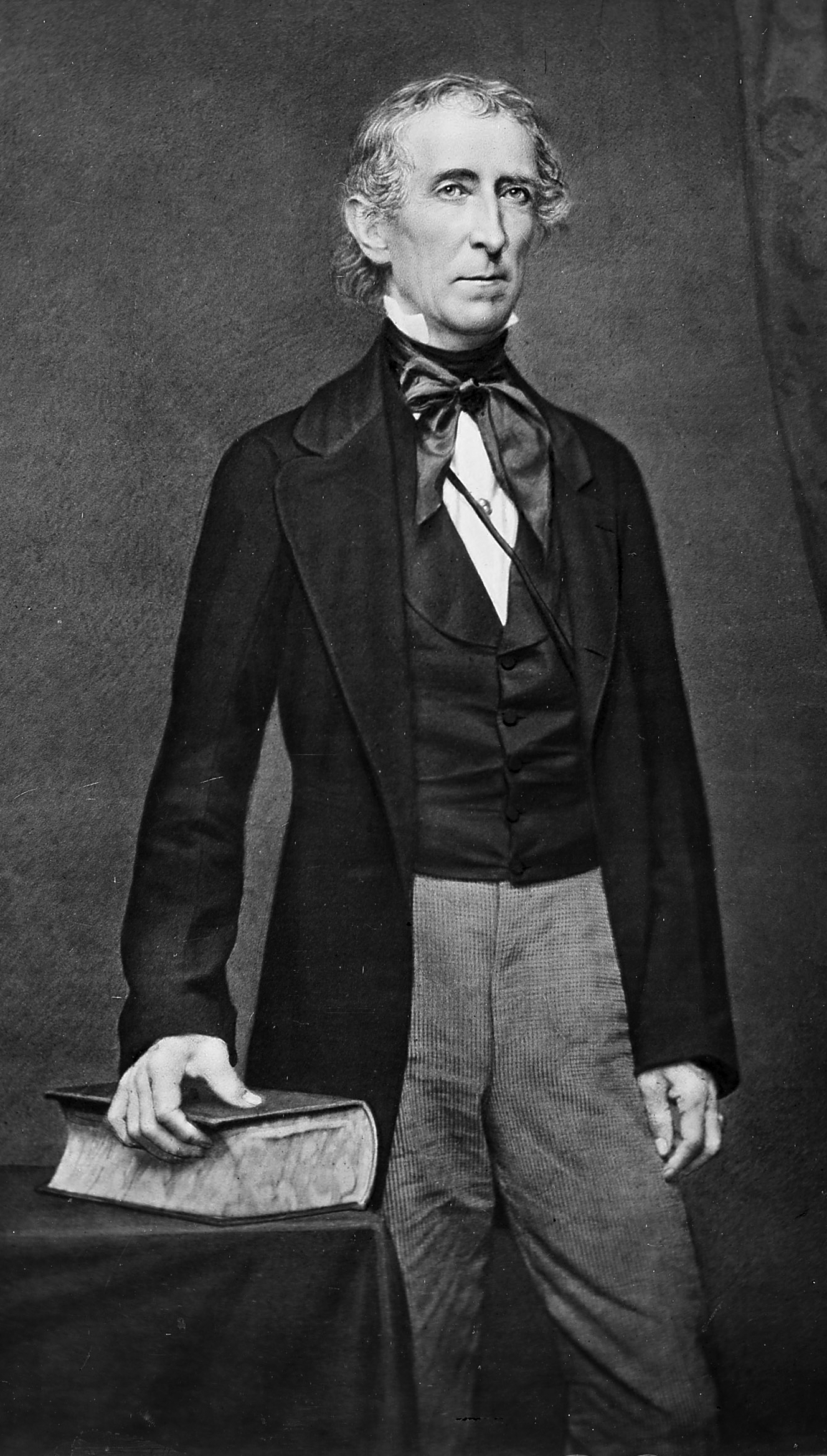
Photo of John Tyler by Brady

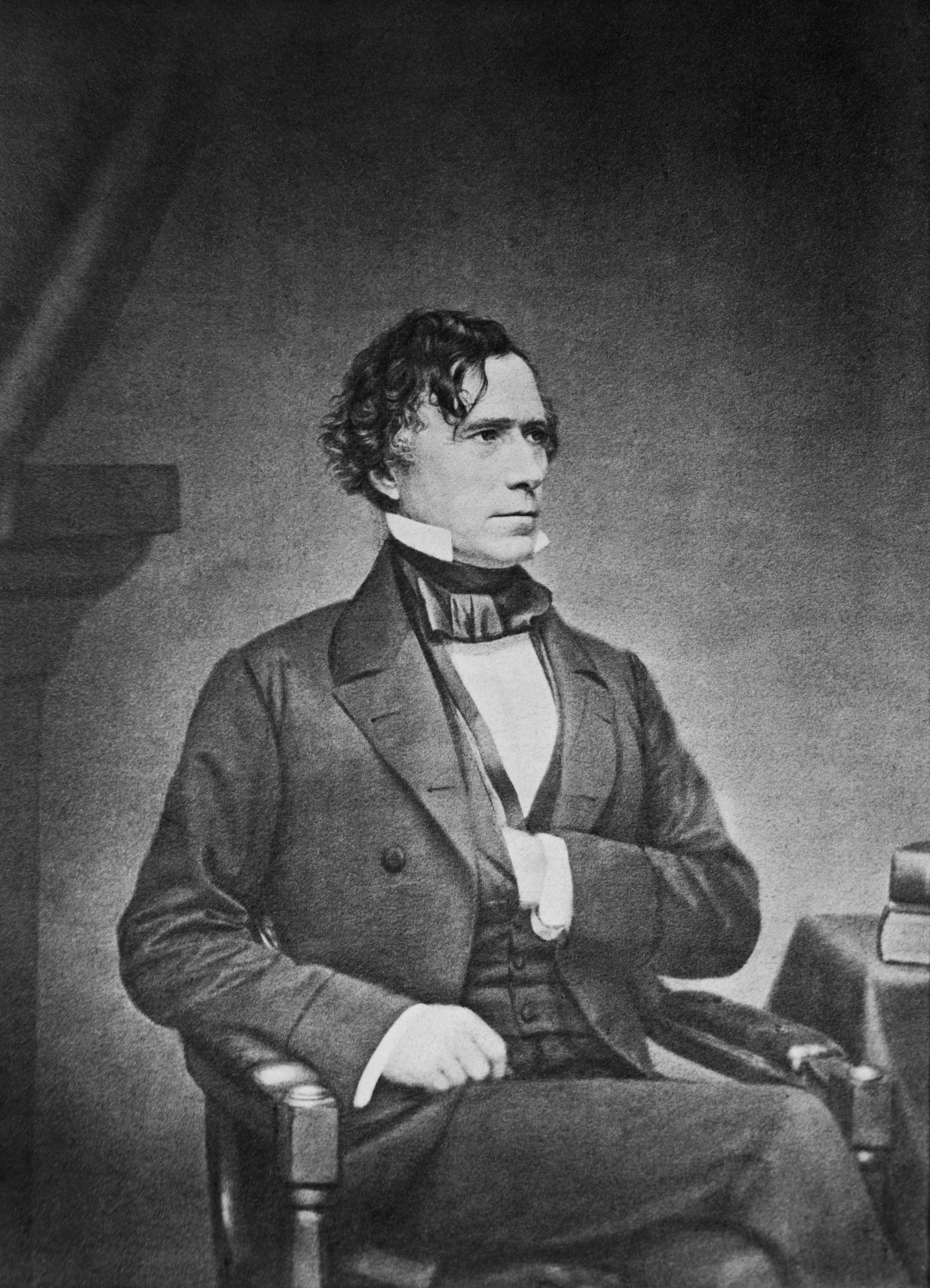
Photo of Franklin Pierce by Brady

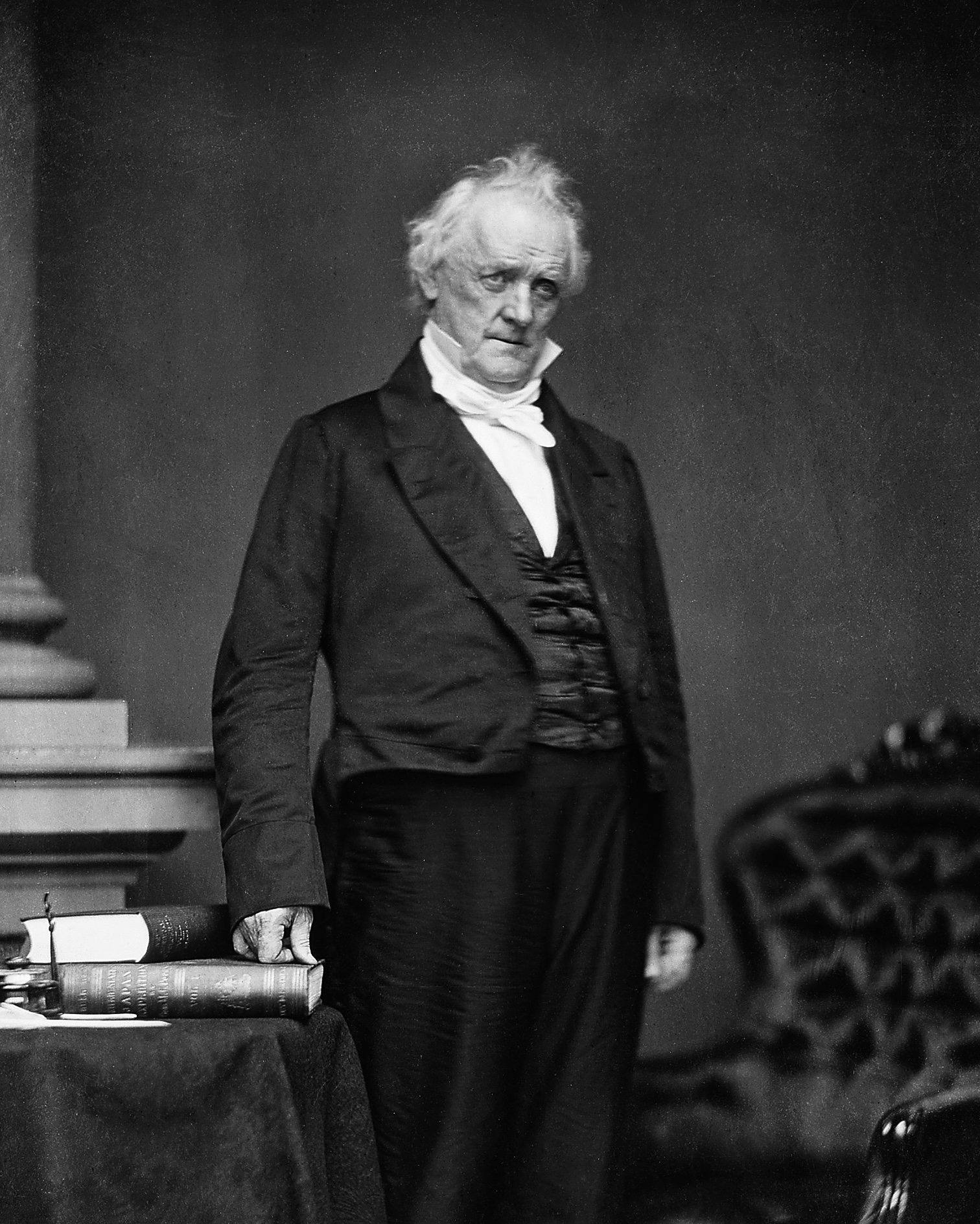
Photo of James Buchanan by Brady

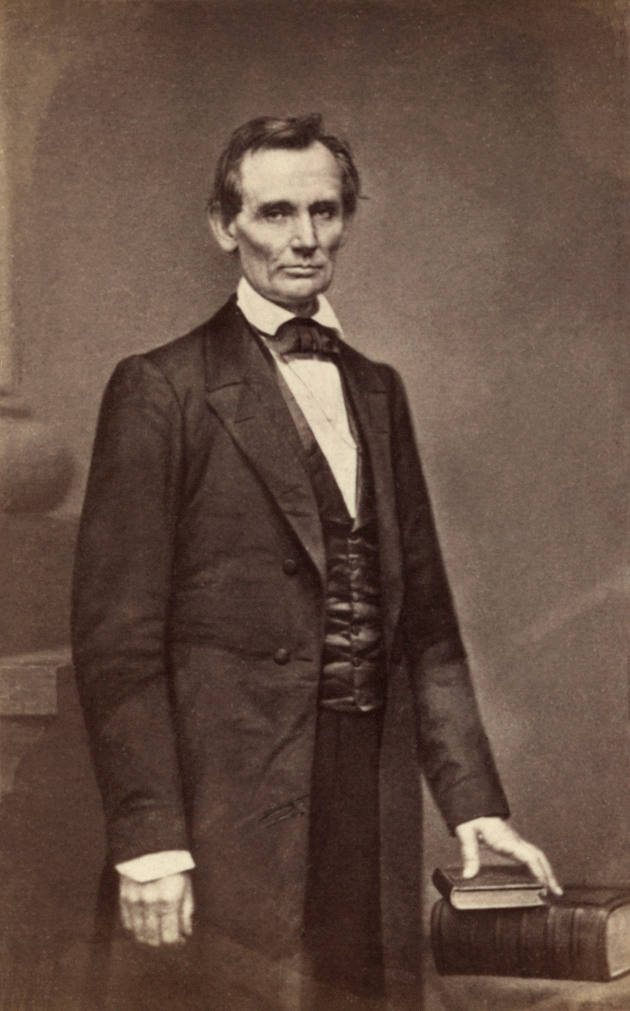
Photo of Abraham Lincoln by Brady on the day of Lincoln's Cooper Union speech, 1860

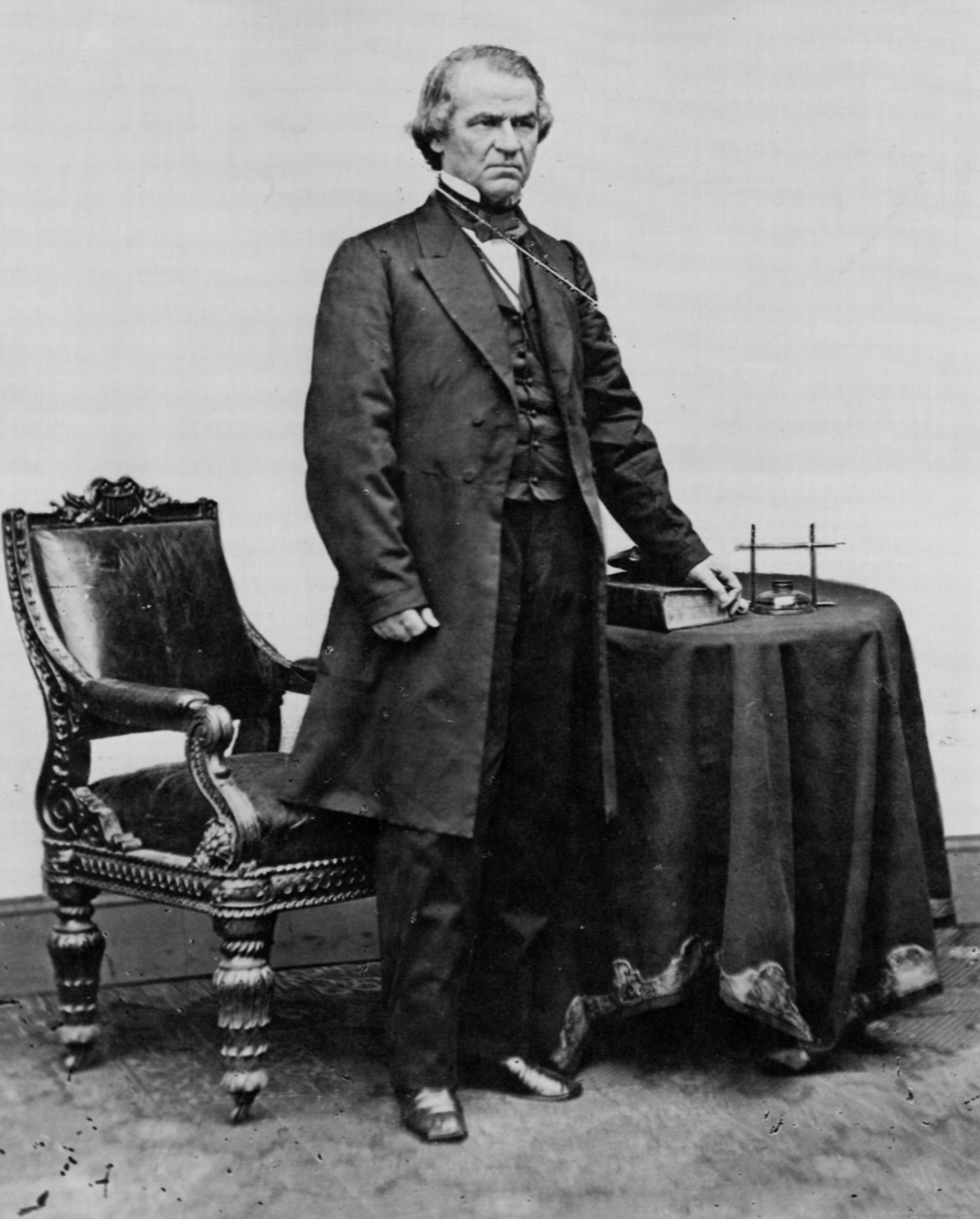
Photo of Andrew Johnson by Brady

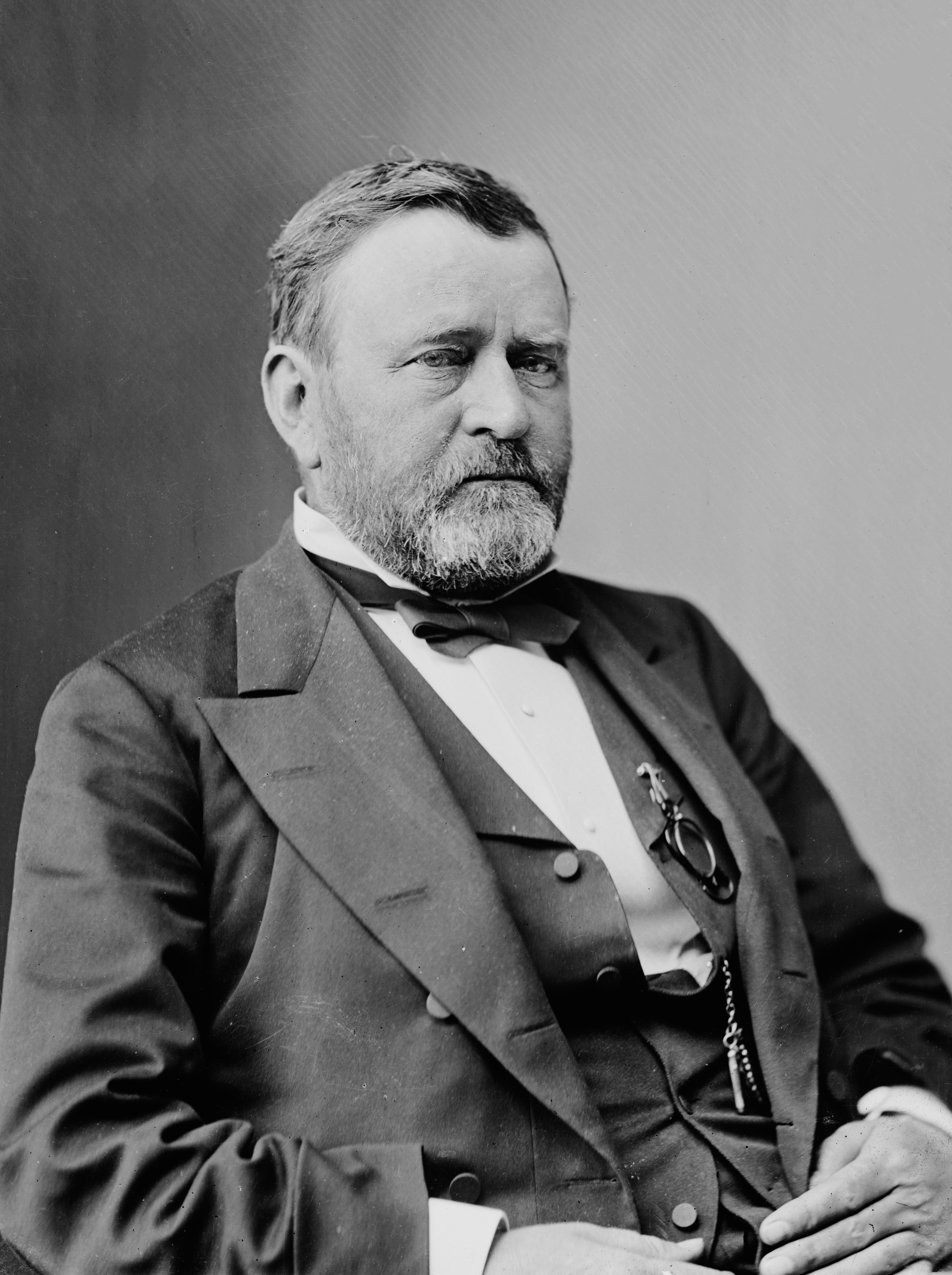
Photo of Ulysses S. Grant by Brady

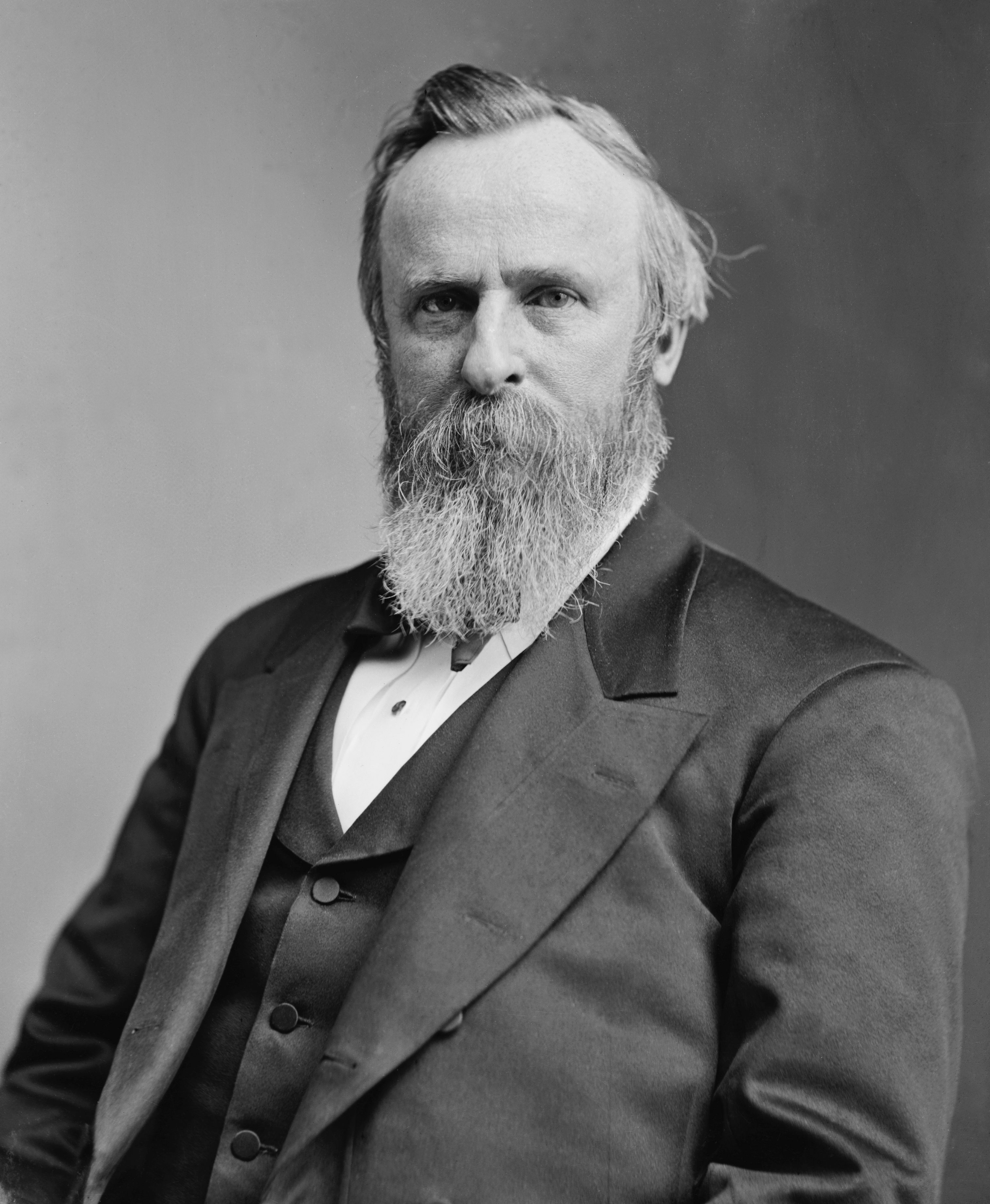
Photo of Rutherford B. Hayes by Brady

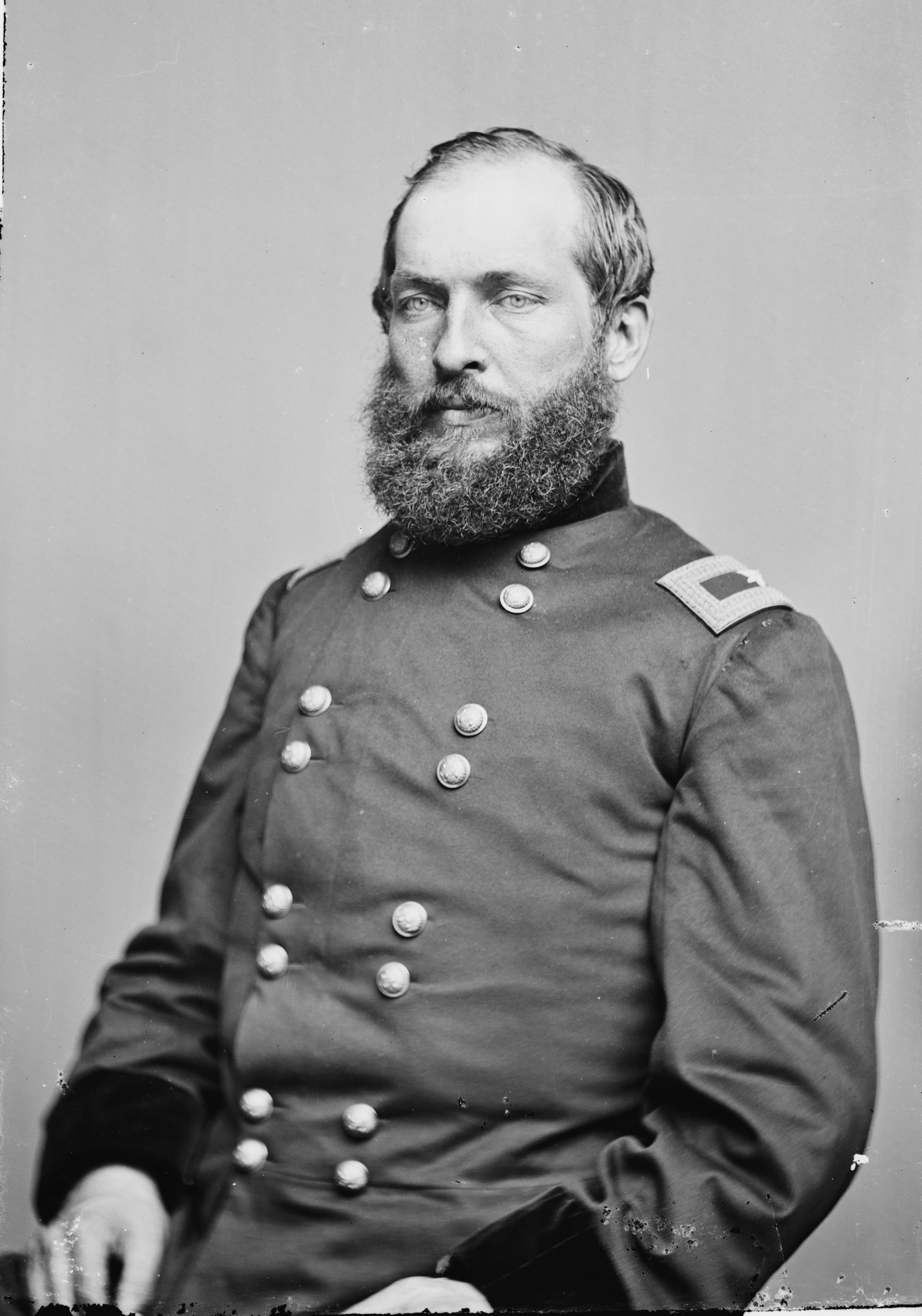
Photo of James A. Garfield by Brady

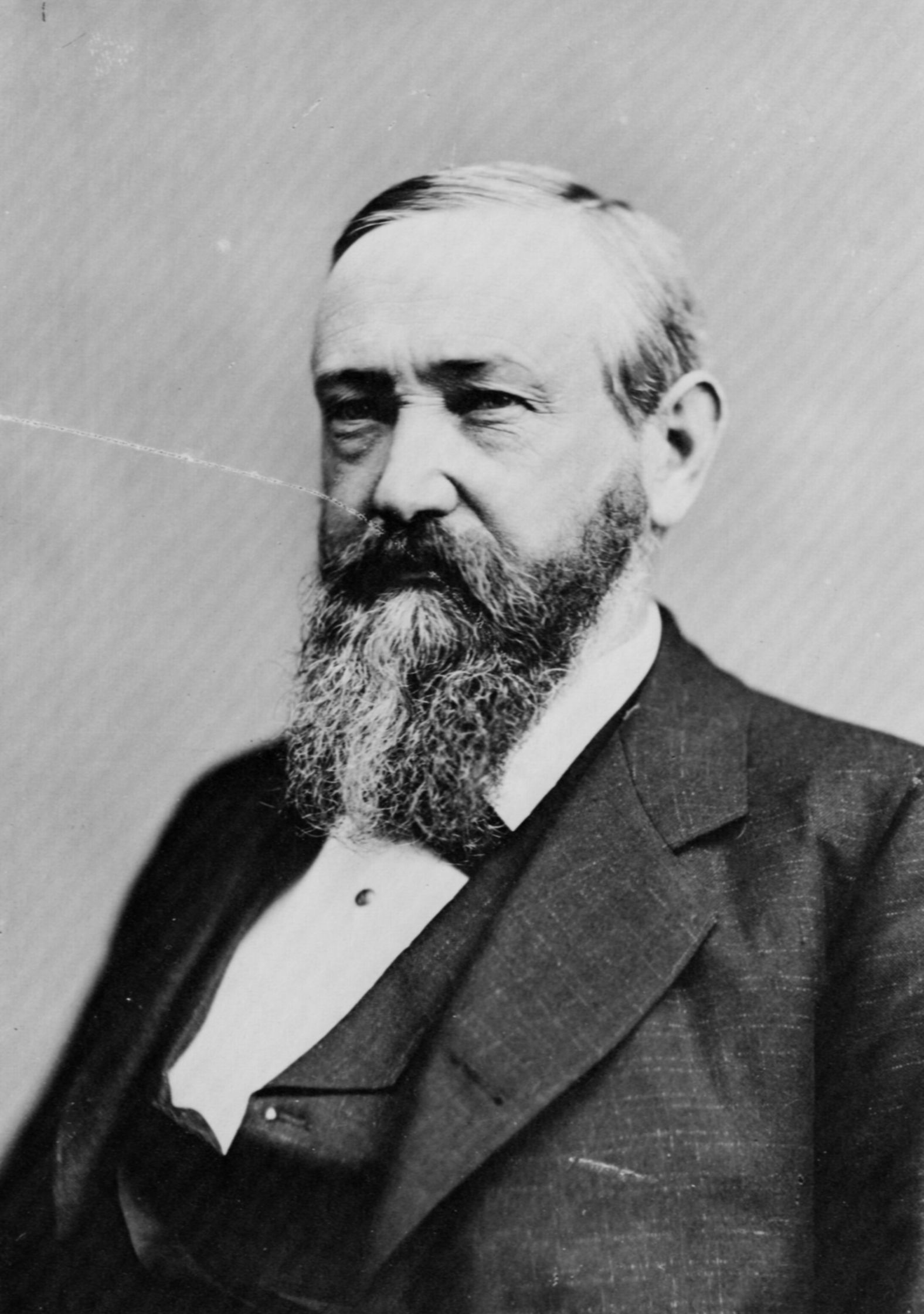
Photo of Benjamin Harrison by Brady

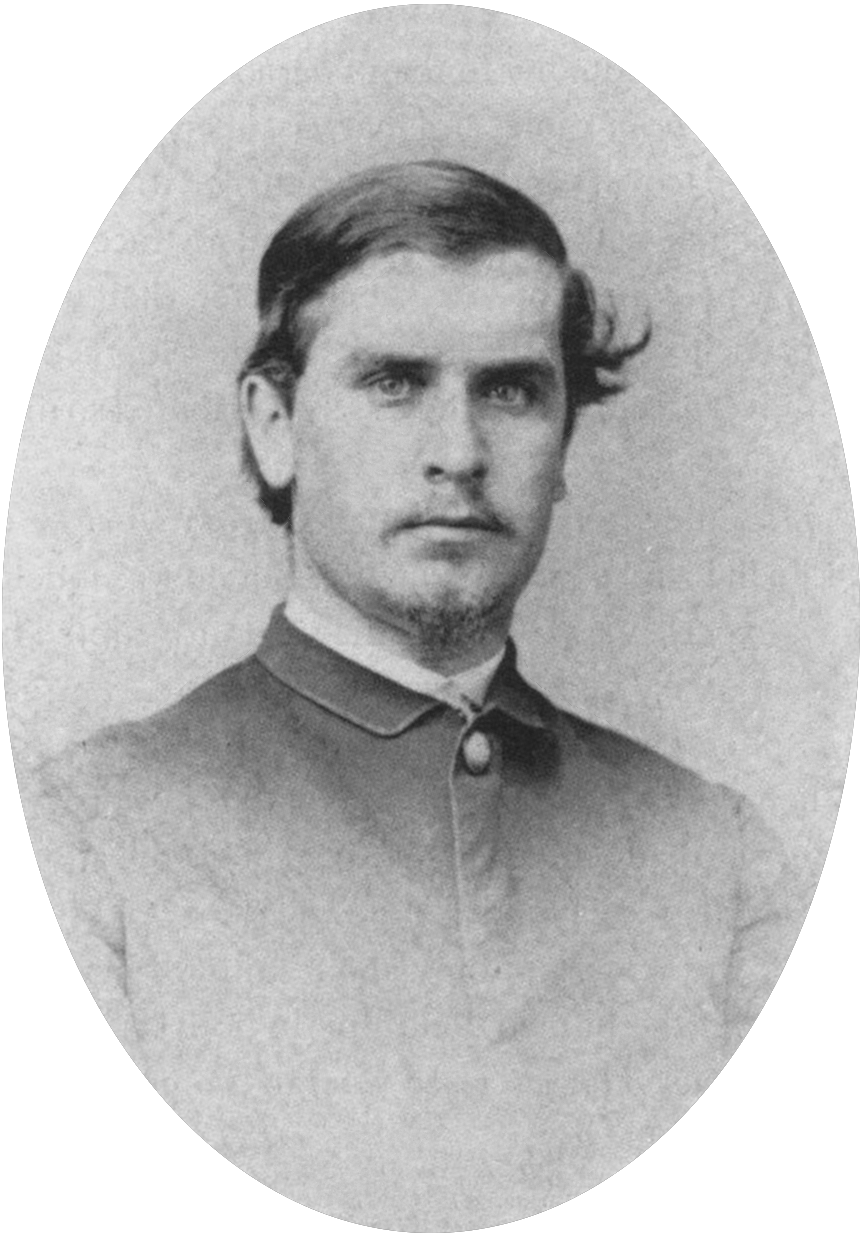
Photo of William McKinley by Brady, 1865

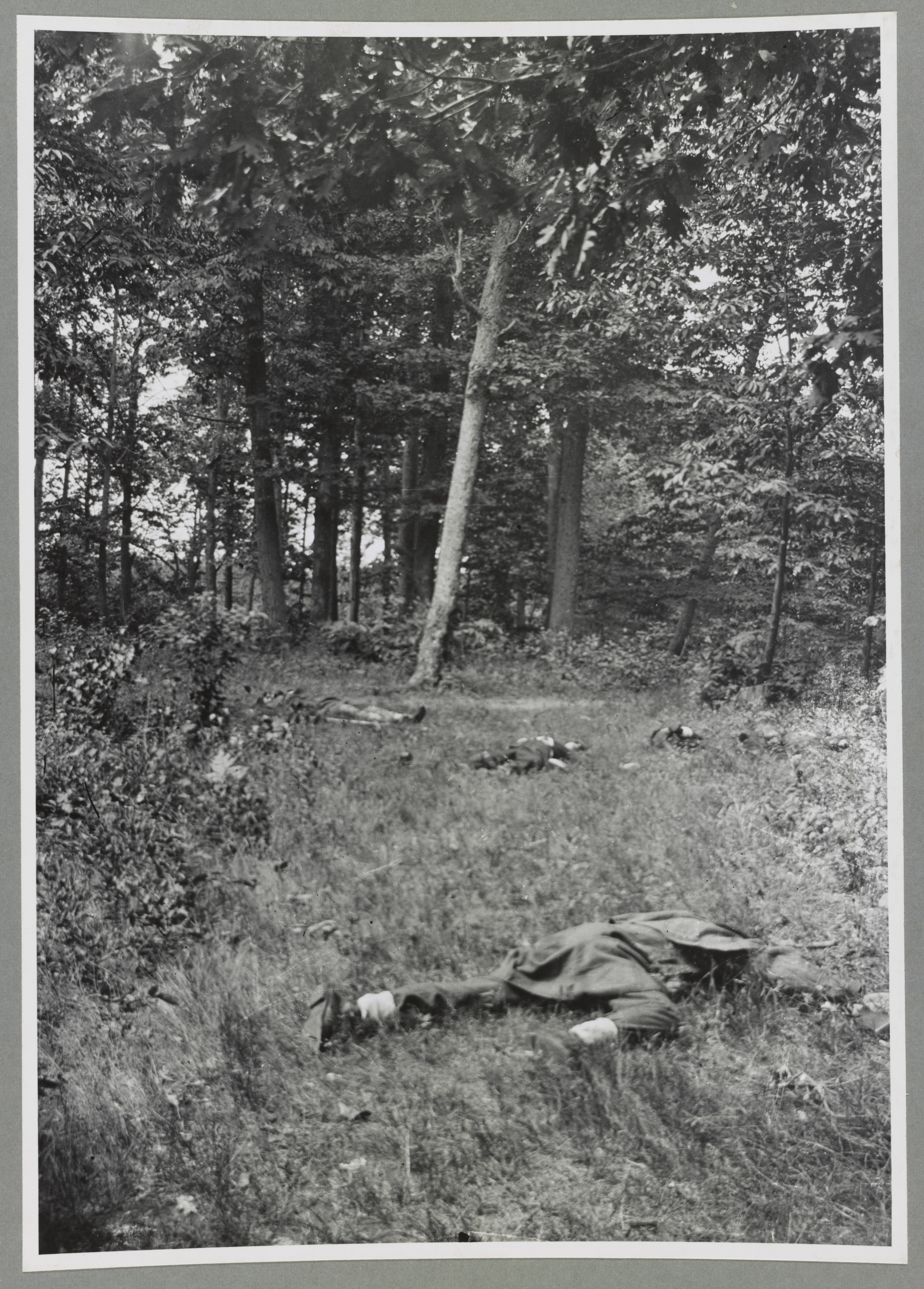
Picture of "Confederate dead on Matthews Hill, Bull Run", Brady Handy Collection

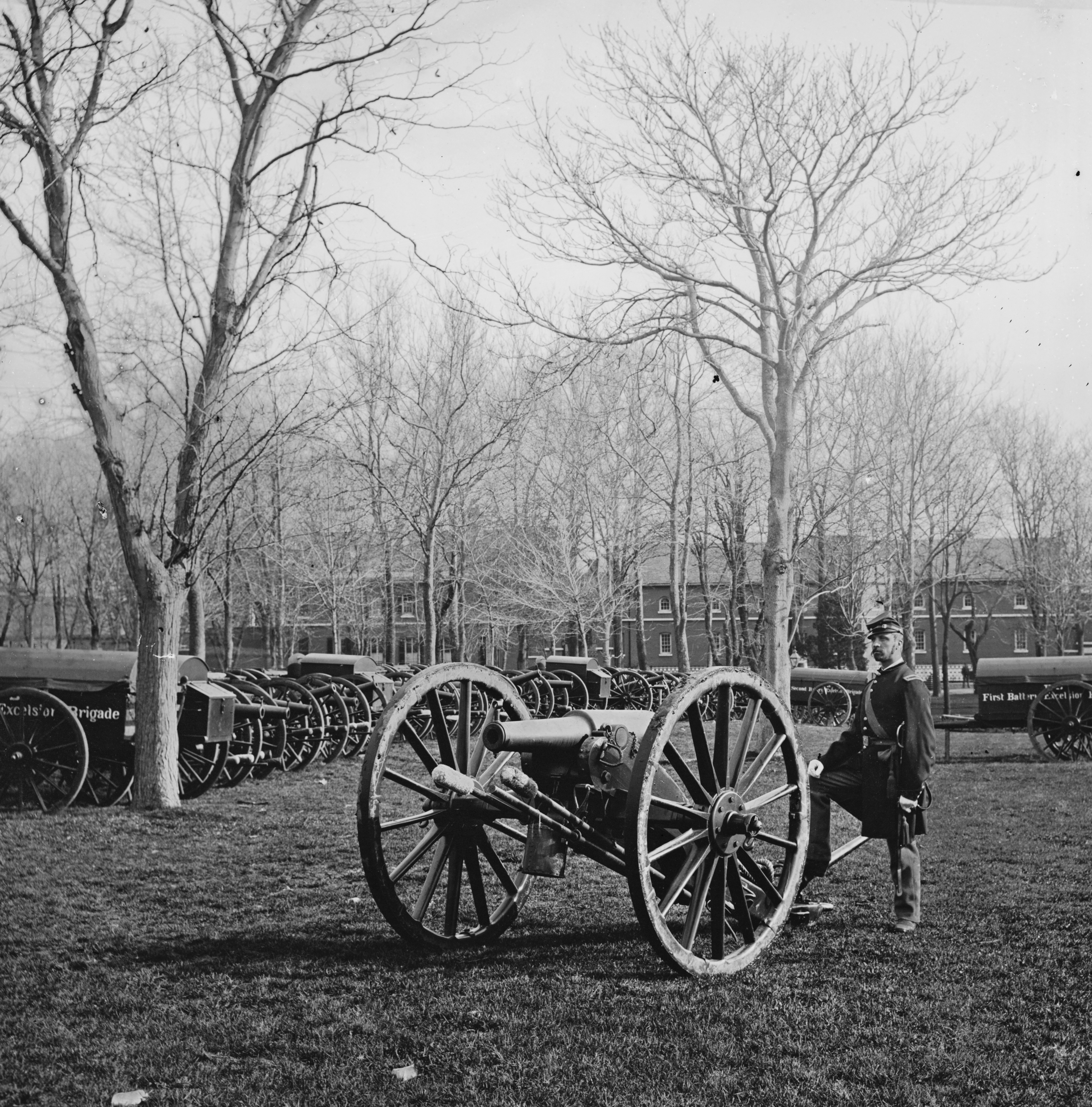
Soldier guarding arsenal, Washington, D.C., 1862

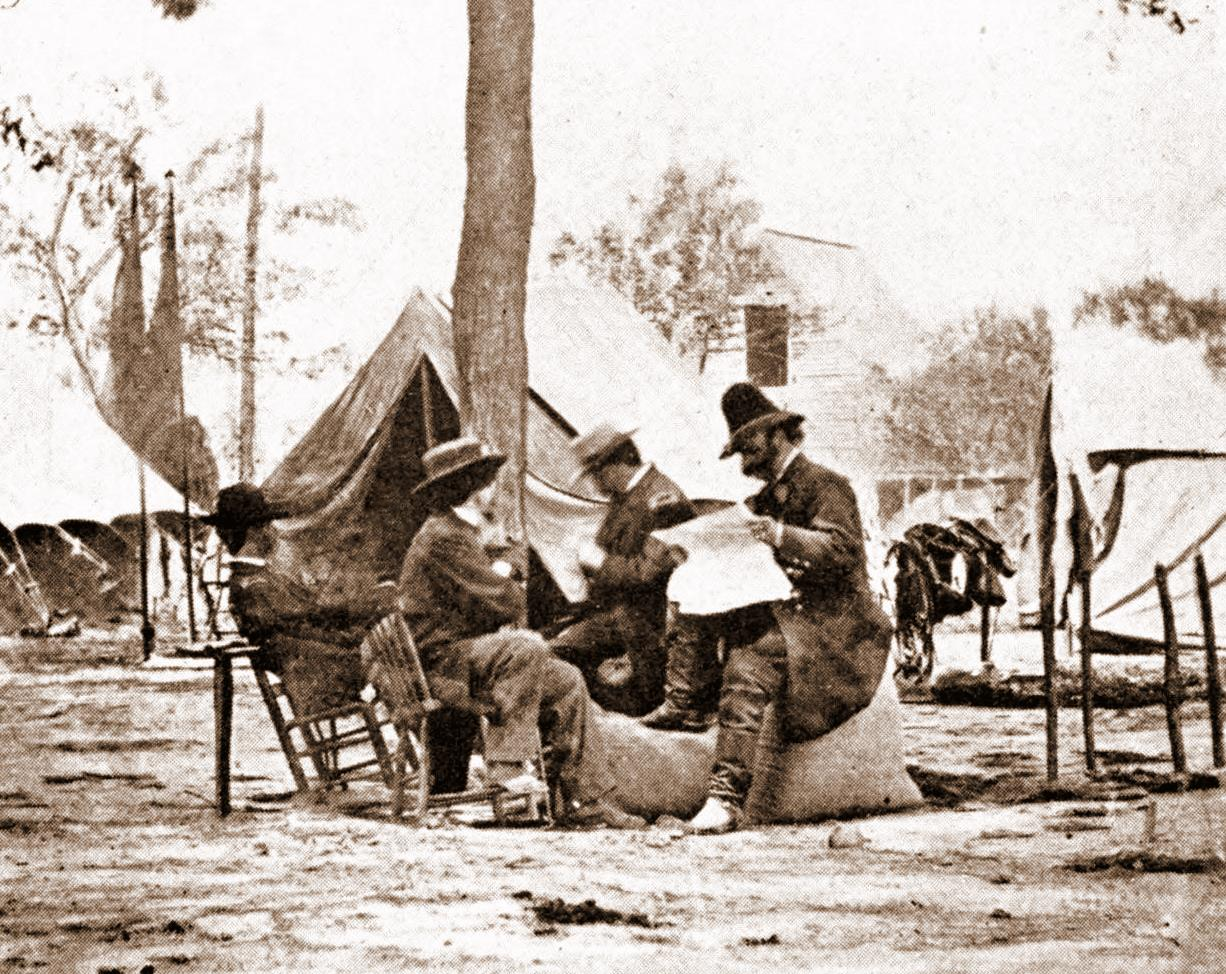
Brady (center, wearing straw hat), with General Ambrose Burnside (reading newspaper), taken in May 1864

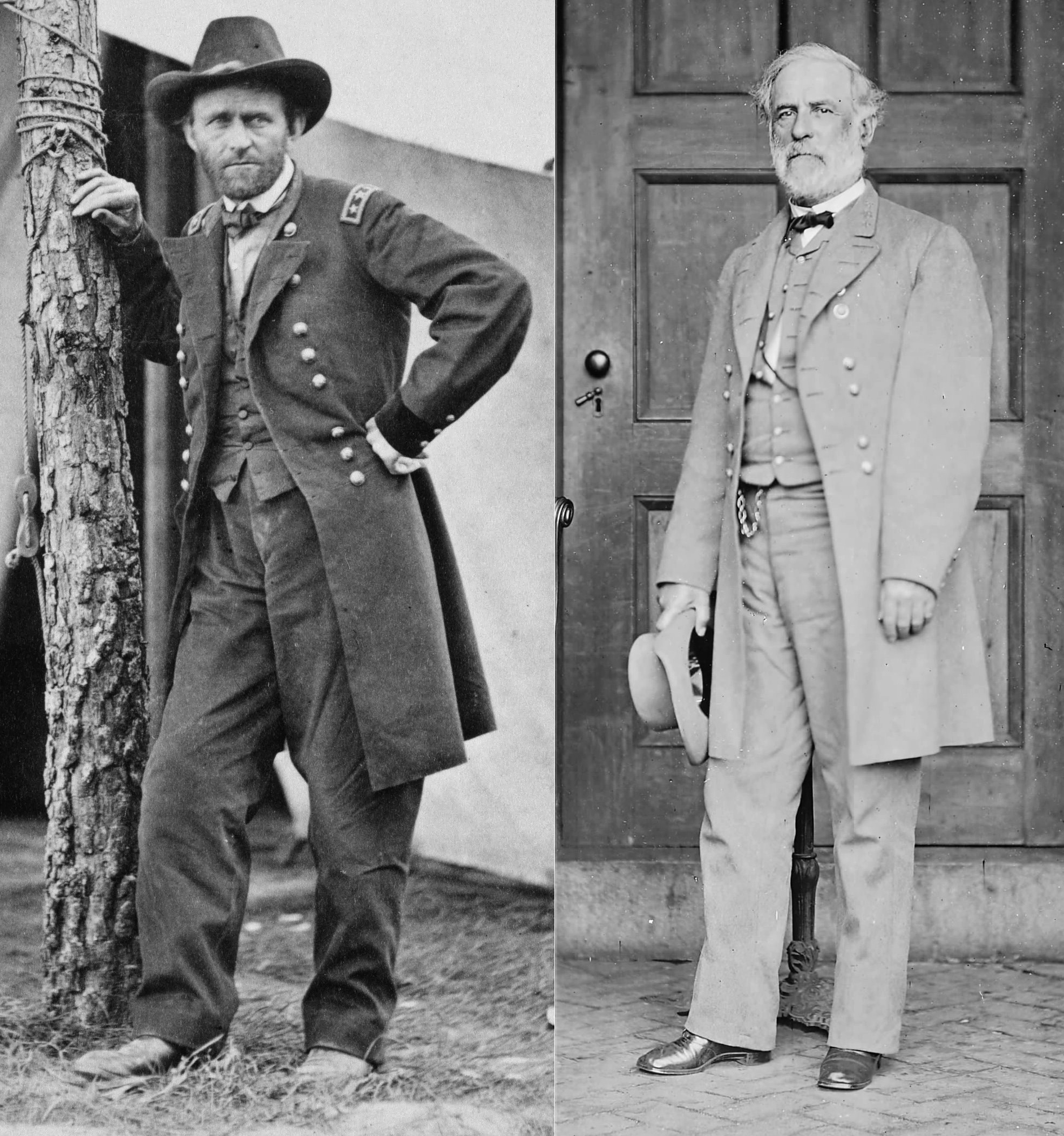
Brady's photos of generals Ulysses S. Grant and Robert E. Lee

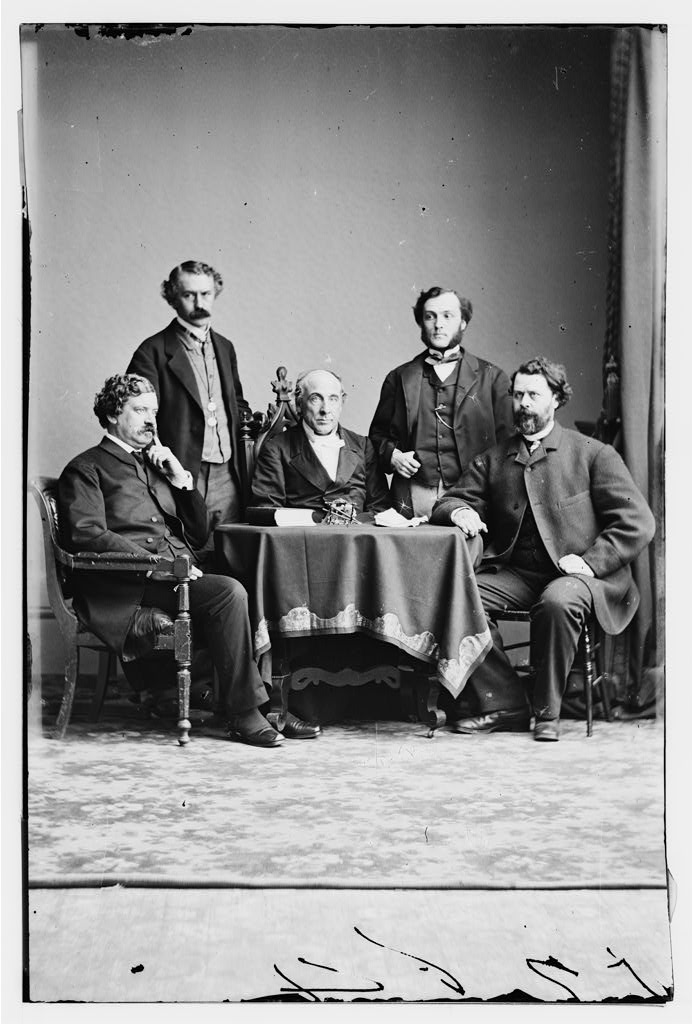
U.S. Sanitary Commission

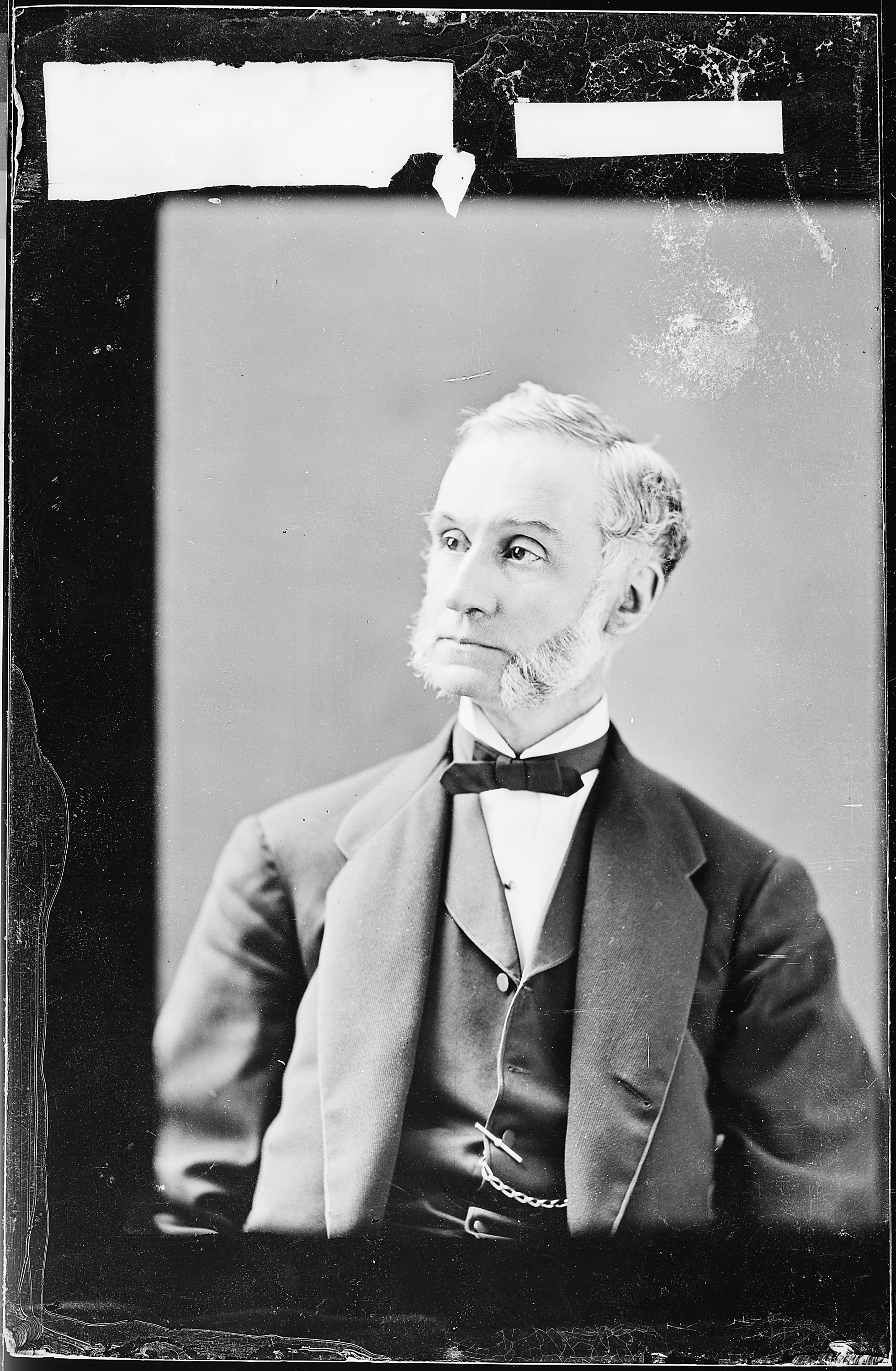
Photo plate of Cornelius R. Agnew

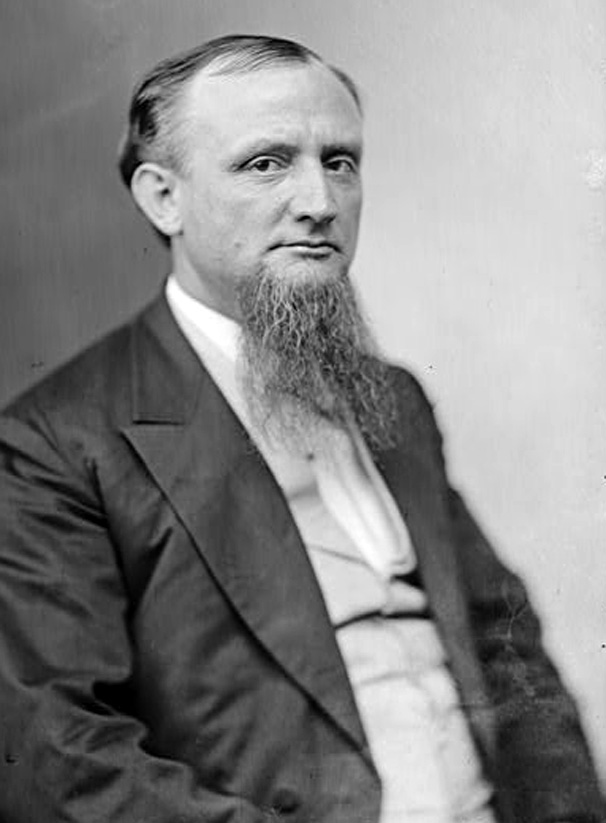
Congressman Van. H. Manning

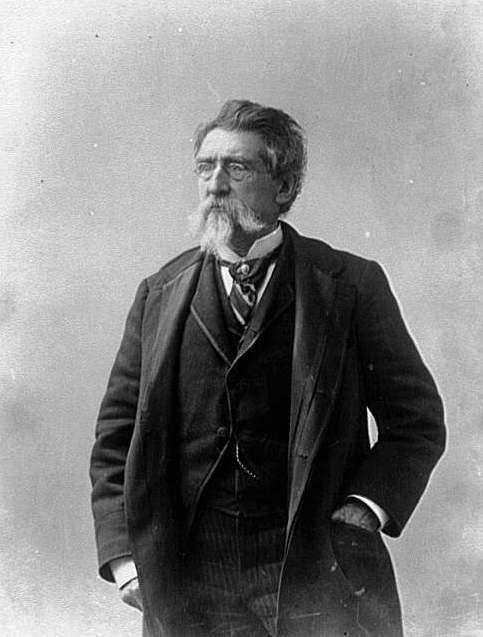
Photograph of Brady, c. 1889

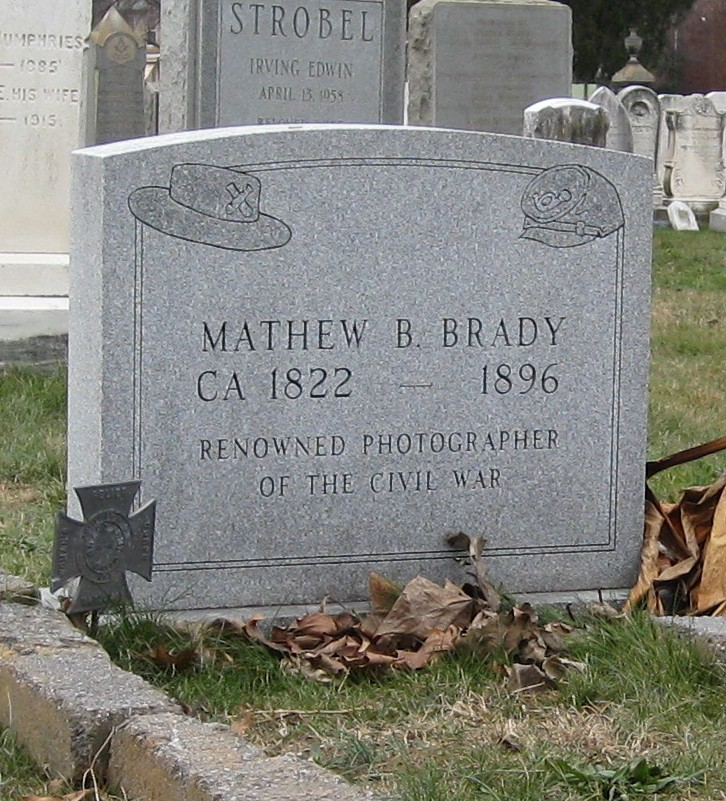
Brady's grave at Congressional Cemetery

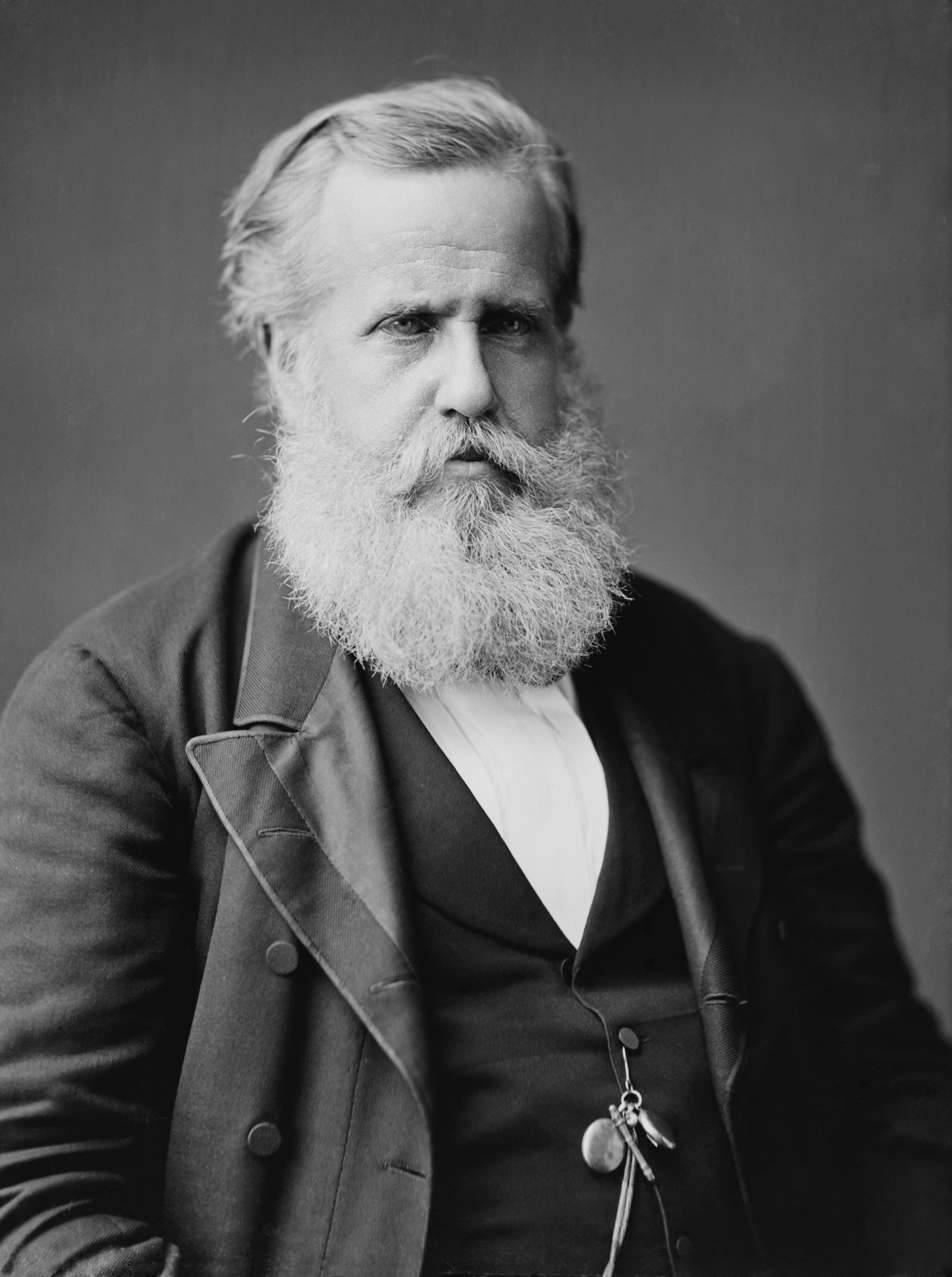
Emperor Pedro II of Brazil

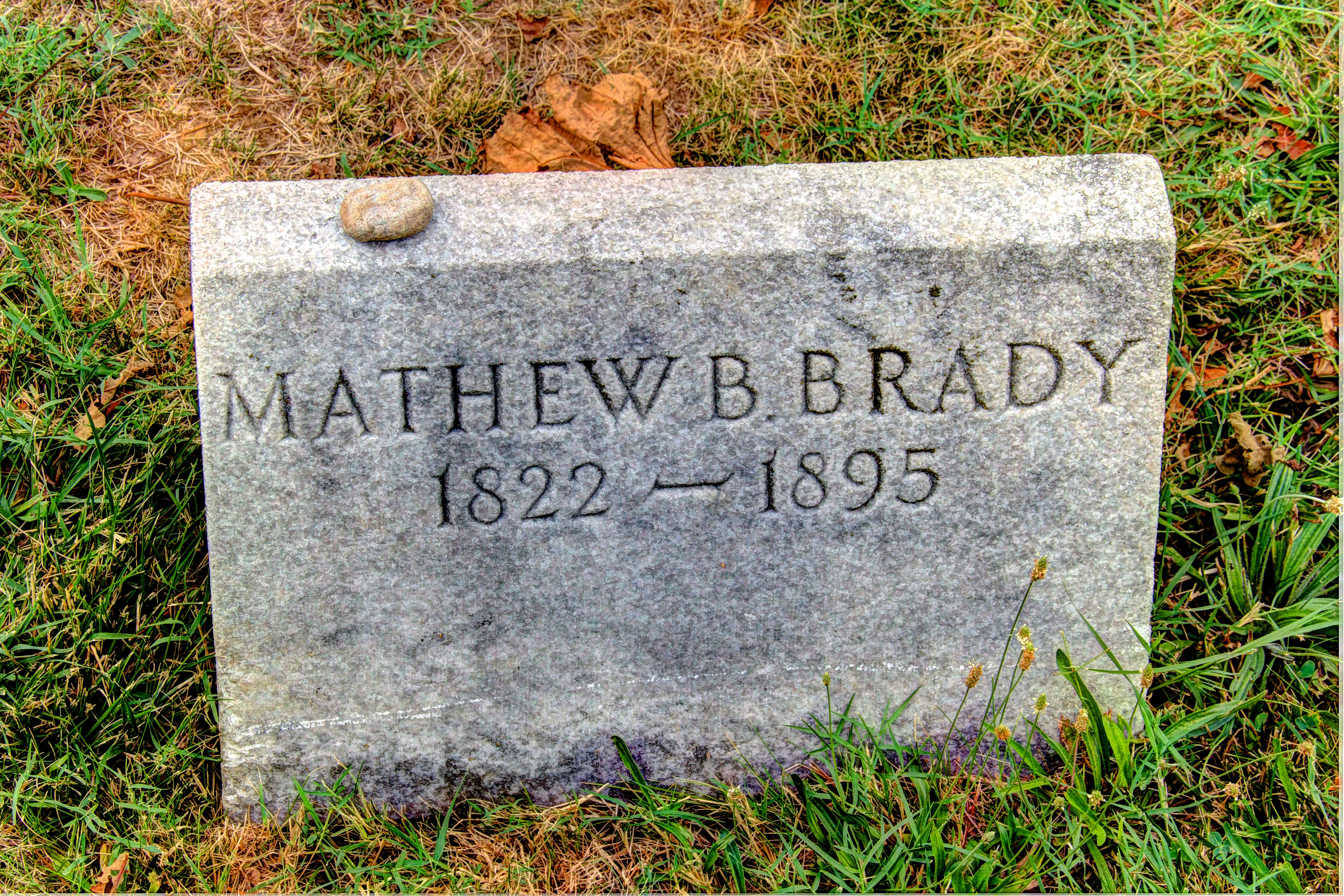
Brady's original grave marker, with incorrect death year

== See also ==
- 359 Broadway – Brady's studio in New York City (1853–1859)
- George S. Cook – his Southern counterpart
- Photographers of the American Civil War
- List of photographs considered the most important
