= George LaGrange Cook =

American photographer (1849–1919)

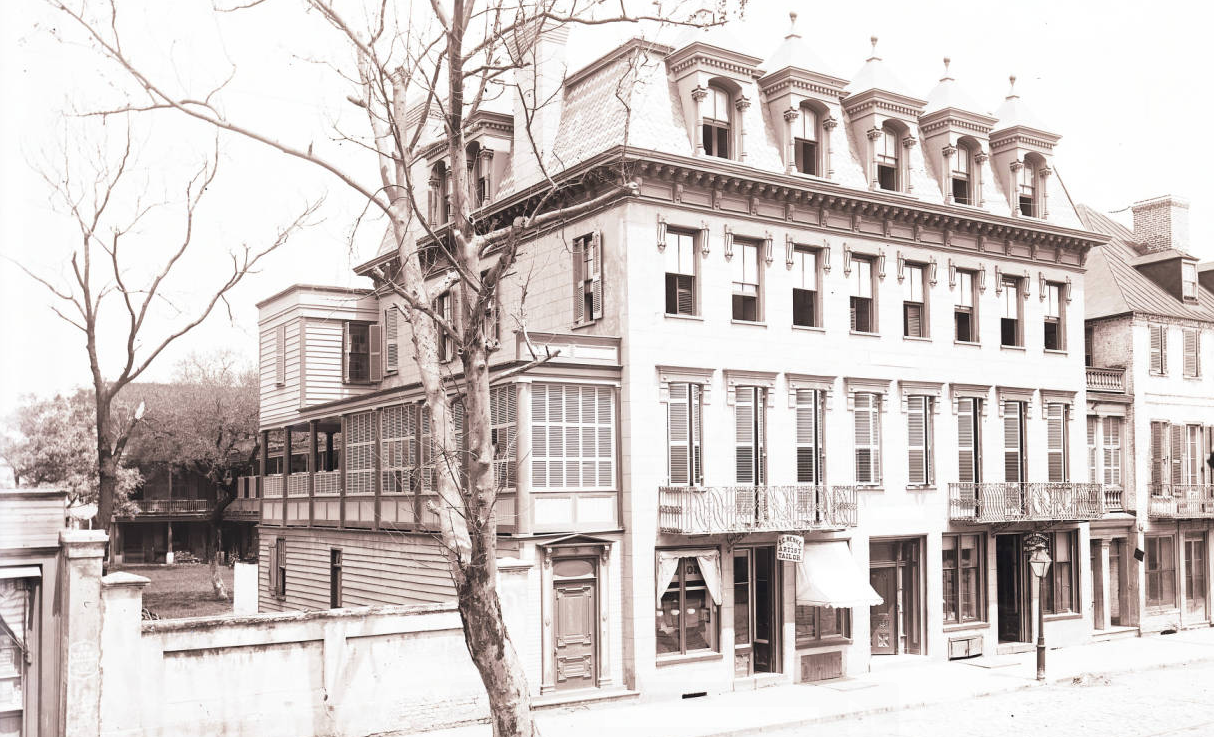
Confederate Home, c. 1890

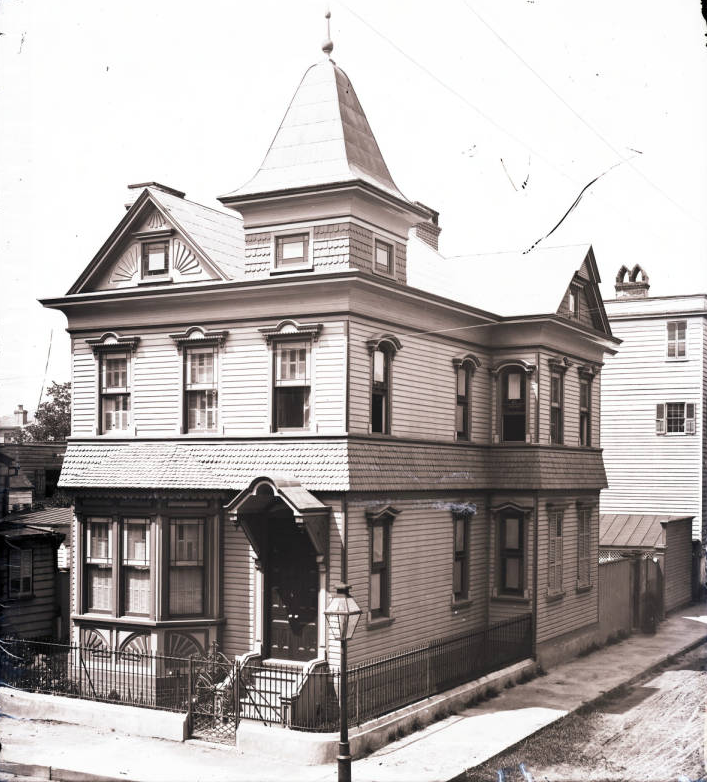
35 Coming Street

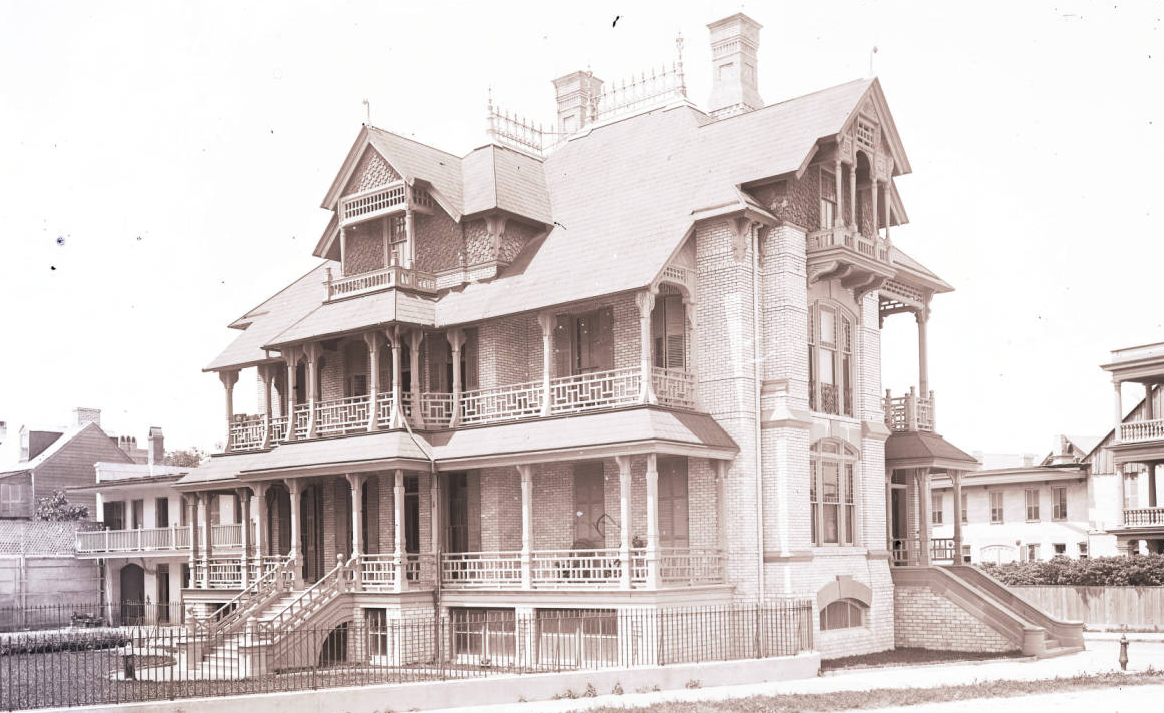
Charles Drayton House, c. 1890

George LaGrange Cook (1849–1919) was a photographer in Charleston, South Carolina. The Gibbes Museum of Art holds a collection of his photographs. He took a range of images: buildings, residences, streets, and portraits.

== Biography ==
Born in 1849 in Charleston, South Carolina, George LaGrange Cook was the eldest son of George S. Cook, a pioneering American photographer, and his first wife Elizabeth. (She died in 1864). Soon after his mother's death, his father married again, to his mother's niece Lavinia Pratt. They had several children together, including Cook's half-brother, Huestis P. Cook (1868–1951).

Cook became a photographer like his father and became established in Charleston. In 1880 his father moved with younger members of the family to Richmond, Virginia. Cook took over his Charleston studio at 281 King Street. He later relocated to 265 King Street.

After the 1886 Charleston earthquake, Cook produced a series of photos titled Cook's Earthquake Views of Charleston and Vicinity. He moved to Richmond about 1890, joining other members of the family.

His younger brother Huestis P. Cook (1868–1951) became a photographer in Richmond, working there for 60 years. After their father died in 1902, Huestis took over his studio in Richmond. Huestis is known for his photographs of people of all classes in Richmond and its area, in addition to landscapes and buildings. Together the two men amassed a collection of images spanning nearly 100 years. The Valentine, a museum of Richmond, bought the collection in 1954.
