= George S. Cook =

American photographer (1819–1902)

George Smith Cook
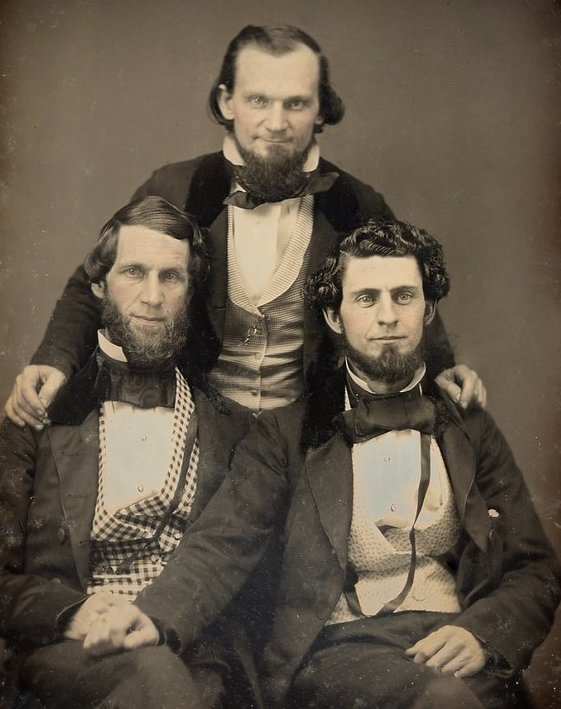
- Cook circa 1862 in center
- Born: February 23, 1819; Stamford, Connecticut
- Died: November 27, 1902 (aged 83); Charleston, South Carolina

George Smith Cook (February 23, 1819 – November 27, 1902) was an early American photographer known as a pioneer in the development of the field. Primarily a studio portrait photographer, he is the first to have taken a photograph of combat during a war: he captured images in 1863 of Union ironclads firing on Fort Moultrie in South Carolina during the Civil War.

For a decade he moved throughout the South and other cities, living for a time in each. He would train students in photography, sell his studio to one, and move on. From 1849, he became skilled in daguerreotype technique after settling in Charleston, South Carolina. He specialized in portrait photography. His first wife died in 1864, and he married again soon after the war.

Cook is known for having amassed a large collection of photographs of figures of the Confederacy and the South, as well as the city of Richmond, Virginia, where he lived from 1880. His sons George LaGrange Cook and Huestis Pratt Cook also became notable photographers, and the younger particularly contributed to the family collection.

George S. and Huestis P. Cook were honored in 1952 with a major exhibition at the Virginia Museum of Fine Arts, entitled Southern Exposure. In 1954, during the directorship of Virginia McKenney Claiborne, The Valentine acquired much of the Cook collection, a total of 10,000 images, mostly glass-plate negatives. From July to November 2019, The Valentine had an exhibit of 40 photographs from this collection. Some 1400 images are available online.

== Biography ==
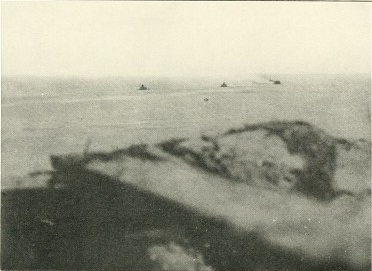
George Cook was the first known photographer to make a photograph of actual combat during a war. Cook took the first image of its kind while visiting Charleston, South Carolina, capturing Union ironclads firing on Fort Moultrie on September 8, 1863

Cook was born on February 23, 1819, in Stamford, Connecticut, and was orphaned at an early age. He began his work life in the mercantile business but was unsuccessful. He later moved to New Orleans and was studying fine art when daguerreotype photography was introduced in the United States in 1839. He became fascinated by this new technique and became interested in photography.

After running a gallery in New Orleans, for ten years he traveled throughout the South, and other major cities. He briefly settled in one city after another. He would establish a studio in a town, train photographers, sell the studio to a promising student, and move on.

Cook settled with his wife Elizabeth in Charleston, South Carolina, in 1849. Their first son, George LaGrange Cook (1849–1919), was born that year. When war came, the senior Cook recorded the effect of the American Civil War on the city. He took the first ever combat photograph in 1863, made during a visit to Fort Sumter, when he captured an image of Union ironclads firing on Fort Moultrie.

Elizabeth Cook died in 1864. Cook soon remarried, to her niece Lavinia Pratt, and had additional children with her, including a second son.

Cook had one more move to make, in 1880 to Richmond, Virginia, the state capital. There he bought the Anderson studio, along with many images, and operated his own studio for the next two decades. He continued to specialize in studio portraits and to work primarily with glass-plate negatives.

Both of his sons, George LaGrange Cook and Huestis P. Cook (1868–1951), became professional photographers. George had established himself before Cook decided to move to Richmond. He took over his father's studio in Charleston and operated it for another decade. After the 1886 Charleston earthquake, George L. Cook took a series of images of its effects in the city. About 1890, the younger George moved to Richmond.

In addition to his own photographs, Cook amassed a large collection of photographs by others of political figures, Richmond and other areas of the South, landscapes and buildings. He died on November 27, 1902.

== Legacy ==
Cook bought the contents of the Anderson Studio in Richmond, and retained its images as part of his own collection. He also bought other collections. When Huestis became an adult, he also worked as a photographer. Together his father and he created and collected some 10,000 images on glass-plate negatives, featuring portraits of figures and places across the South, and particularly in and around Richmond. Huestis took over the Cook Studio and had a career of 60 years.

The father and son were honored posthumously in 1952 (a year after Huestis's death) by an exhibit of their work, entitled Southern Exposure, at the Virginia Museum of Fine Arts. In 1954 the book Shadows in Silver: A Record of Virginia, 1850-1900, in Contemporary Photographs Taken by George and Huestis Cook with Additions from the Cook Collection, by A. Lawrence Kocher and Howard Dearstyne, was published about their work. That same year The Valentine museum purchased much of the Cook collection from Mary Latimer Cook, the widow of Huestis. It was a total of 10,000 images, including prints and thousands of glass-plate negatives.

The authors of Shadows in Silver (1954) (see below), had started working with Huestis Cook to prepare a book about him and his father. He gave them valuable personal information about his family and their photographic enterprise. After Huestis Cook's death, the researchers aided the transport of the Cook collection to his widow's new home. On September 15, 1954 The Valentine acquired this collection.

The Valentine has digitized 1400 images from the Cook collection and made them available online. It continues to work on cataloguing, digitizing, and organizing the huge collection. From July to November 2019, The Valentine mounted Images from the Cook Studio, its first exhibit of 40 prints taken by Cook and his son Huestis.

== See also ==
- John Henry Devereux
- Mathew Brady
