= Huestis P. Cook =

American photographer (1868–1951)

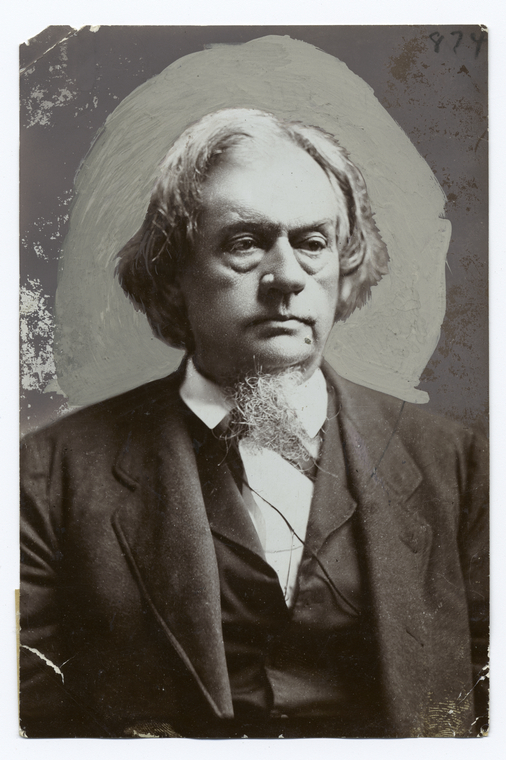
Photograph of Robert Toombs, former Secretary of State of the Confederacy, by Heustis Cook

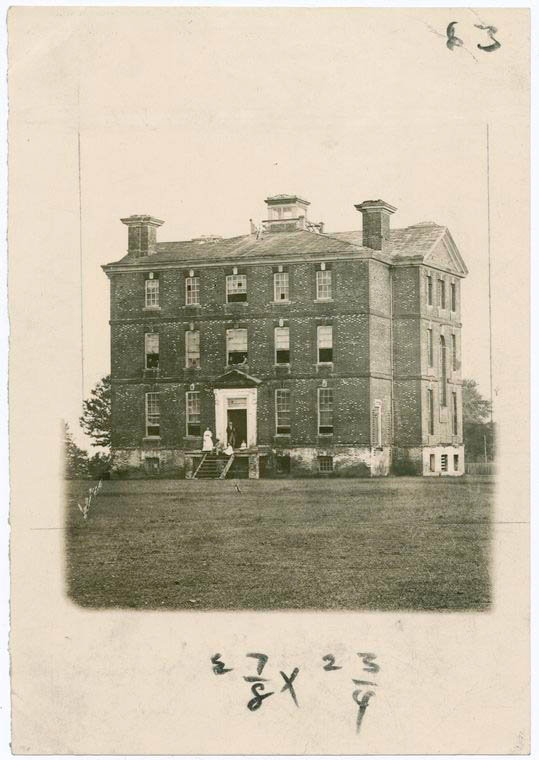
Rosewell Plantation in Gloucester County, Virginia

Huestis Pratt Cook (July 3, 1868 – August 1, 1951) was an American photographer based in Richmond, Virginia. He captured many images on glass-plate negatives, a technique he learned from his father. He took over his father's studio after his death and had a full photography business.

He was a son of George S. Cook, known for taking the first photograph of active combat in 1863 during the American Civil War. The senior Cook developed expertise in daguerrotypes and had been active in Charleston, South Carolina and Richmond, Virginia.

== Biography ==
Huestis Pratt Cook was born on July 3, 1868, in Charleston, South Carolina to George Smith Cook (1819-1902) and his second wife Lavinia Pratt. She was the niece of George Cook's late wife Elizabeth, who died in 1864.

His father moved the family to Richmond in 1880, when Heustis was twelve. There the senior Cook had his last photography studio. Heustis attended local schools and also learned photography from his father, including techniques with glass-plate negatives, developing and printing. The eldest son, George LaGrange Cook, had also become a photographer and had stayed in Charleston, taking over their father's studio there. After a decade, he joined the rest of the family in Richmond.

Heustis Cook married Mary Latimer and set up his own photography business.

After his father died in 1902, Cook took over the studio at 913 East Main Street in Richmond. Huestis Cook is known for his photographs of African Americans. Cook's work also includes self portraits but encompasses a wide range of subjects. Together he and his father had amassed a large collection of photos of people and places in the city of Richmond, images produced from glass-plate negatives.

Cook died on August 1, 1951, at his home in Richmond. He was buried in Hollywood Cemetery. After his death, his widow, Mary Latimer Cook, later helped researchers discover thousands of the family's photographs and glass plate negatives. In 1954, during the directorship of Virginia McKenney Claiborne, some 10,000 images were acquired by The Valentine, the museum of Richmond. They are being catalogued, organized, and digitized. The Valentine featured 40 of the images in an exhibit in July 2019.
