= George Cooke (deputy governor) =

Deputy Governor of Bombay

George Cooke was the Deputy Governor of Bombay from 1689 to 1690.
