= George Cooke (actor, 1807–1863) =

English actor

- Born: 7 March 1807; Manchester
- Died: 4 March 1863 (aged 55)
- Occupation: Actor

George Cooke (7 March 1807 – 4 March 1863) was an English actor.

== Biography ==
Cooke was born in Manchester on 7 March 1807. After performing Othello in amateur theatricals, he quit the mercantile firm of Hoyle & Co., with which he had been placed, and began in March 1828 his professional career at Walsall. Under Chamberlayne, the manager of the Walsall Theatre, he remained eighteen months, playing in Coventry, Lichfield, and Leamington. He then joined other managements; played at Margate, at Doncaster, September 1832, where he was a success, and appeared in Edinburgh on 16 Oct. 1835 as Old Crumbs in the ‘Rent Day.’ In 1837 he appeared at the Strand, then under the management of W. J. Hammond, playing on 10 July 1837 Mr. Wardle in Moncrieff's adaptation, ‘Sam Weller, or the Pickwickians.’ He accompanied Hammond to Drury Lane in October 1839 in his disastrous season at that theatre. Cooke married in 1840 Miss Eliza Stuart, sister of the well-known actor. After playing engagements at Liverpool, Manchester, and Birmingham, he appeared at the Marylebone in 1847, when that theatre was under the management of Mrs. Warner. Here he played the Old Shepherd in the ‘Winter's Tale,’ Sir Oliver Surface, Colonel Damas, and Major Oakley. Previous to his death, which was by suicide, 4 March 1863, he was playing secondary characters at the Olympic.
