= George Cooke (footballer) =

English footballer (1899–1977)

Personal information
- Full name: George Harry Cooke
- Date of birth: 20 November 1899
- Place of birth: Clowne, England
- Date of death: 1977 (aged 77–78)
- Position: Winger

Senior career*
Years	Team	Apps	(Gls)
1919	Clowne Miners Welfare		
1919–1920	Creswell White Star		
1920	Bolsover Town		
1920–1921	Bolsover Colliery		
1921–1922	Chesterfield	0	(0)
1922–1923	Shirebrook		
1923–1924	Norwich City	4	(0)
1924–1925	Portsmouth	2	(0)
1925–1926	Southend United	2	(0)
1926–1928	Wigan Borough	61	(10)
1928–1929	Mansfield Town		
1929–1930	Bradford (Park Avenue)	0	(0)
1930	Connah's Quay & Shotton		
1931	Grantham		
Total		69	(10)
- * Club domestic league appearances and goals

George Harry Cooke (20 November 1899 – 1977) was an English footballer who played in the Football League for Norwich City, Portsmouth, Southend United and Wigan Borough.
