= Alexander Gardner =

Alexander Gardner may refer to:

- Alexander Gardner (photographer) (1821–1882), Scottish photographer who emigrated to the United States
- Alexander Gardner (soldier) (1785–1877), traveller, soldier and mercenary
- Alex Gardner (artist) (born 1987), American figurative painter
- Alex Gardner (baseball) (1861–1926), Canadian baseball player
- Alex Gardner (footballer) (1877–1952), Scottish footballer for Newcastle United
- Alex Gardner (singer) (born 1991), Scottish singer-songwriter now known as A-L-X
