= Alex Gardner (artist) =

American artist

- Born: 1987; Long Beach, California
- Education: California State University, Long Beach
- Known for: Painting

Alex Gardner (born 1987, Long Beach, California) is an American visual artist working as a figurative painter. Gardner is based in Los Angeles, and has exhibited his work in cities across the United States, Europe and Asia.

== Work and Career ==
Alex Gardner holds a BFA from California State University, Long Beach (2011).

His acrylic paintings often depict anonymous and faceless Black subjects against light colored backgrounds. His human figures are painted in tons of gray, black and blue, and often perform daily and relational tasks. The artist has referenced Old Masters such as Michelangelo and El Greco in previous interviews and statements.

In a 2016 interview for Juxtapoz Magazine, Gardner stated that he is interested "in the entire spectrum of human emotion" through his paintings.

His first museum solo show in the United States, Guest Room was presented in 2019 at SCAD Museum of Art, in the campus of Savannah College of Art and Design, Georgia, and gathered newly produced paintings and commissioned artworks. The pictures in the show commented on identity issues such as race and gender in American as well as European art historical narratives from Mannerism to Renaissance.

In 2020, Alex Gardner started developing the Blues series, a body of work depicting his signature human figures in shades of blue. The series was later on view at The Hole in New York City in a solo show titled Blues showcasing a set of 10 new paintings. In an interview to Metal Magazine, the artist comments on creating work as a coping mechanism during the COVID-19 global pandemic.

The Long Beach Museum of Art, in his California hometown, organized the solo exhibition We All Exist Right Now, in 2022. The show included 17 paintings pointing to Gardner's career and painting trajectory. The accompanying catalog was co-published with Friend Editions, an independent publishing house in New York.

In 2023, Gardner was one of eleven international visual artists selected to collaborate with fashion house Dior for their yearly Dior Lady Art collaboration celebrating the handbag's historical design.

Gardner's work is included in the collections of the Pérez Art Museum Miami; Florida; Institute of Contemporary Art Miami, Florida; Museo Jumex, Mexico City; and X Museum, Beijing, China.
