= List of photographs of George Armstrong Custer =

List of surviving photographs of George Armstrong Custer

According to author D. Mark Katz, there are 158 known photographs of George Armstrong Custer. George Custer had his photo taken by 38 photographers on 74 different occasions, from 1857 until his death at Little Bighorn in 1876.

Image	Date	Photographer	Location	Owner	Notes
	June 1857	H. Davis	Cadiz, Ohio	Harrison County Historical Society	A photograph of 17-year-old George Custer holding an ambrotype of his lover Mary Holland, taken by H. Davis of Ohio.
	June 1861	George Rockwood	United States Military Academy, West Point, New York	West Point Museum	George Armstrong Custer in West Point Uniform, Class of 1861.
	July 18, 1861	Unknown photographer	United States Military Academy, West Point, New York	National Portrait Gallery	George Custer as a cadet at the United States Military Academy with a Colt Model 1855 Sidehammer Pocket Revolver.
	May 20, 1862	James F. Gibson	Virginia Peninsula	Library of Congress	Lieutenant Custer with Nicolas Bowen, and William G. Jones.
	May 20, 1862	James F. Gibson	Virginia Peninsula	Library of Congress	George Custer with William G. Jones and staff of Gen. Fitz-John Porter.
	May 31, 1862	Alexander Gardner and James Gibson	Fair Oaks, Virginia	Public Domain	George Custer with a former West Point classmate, Lieutenant James Barroll Washington, who had recently been captured by Union forces.
	May 31, 1862	Alexander Gardner and James Gibson	Fair Oaks, Virginia	Public Domain	George Armstrong Custer, Confederate Prisoner Lieutenant James Barroll Washington and a Young Slave.
	October 3, 1862	Alexander Gardner	Sharpsburg, Maryland	Library of Congress	Custer (far right) with President Abraham Lincoln, General McClellan and other officers at the Battle of Antietam.
	November 1862	Edward P. Hipple	Unknown	Jack M. Streling	A photograph of Captain George A. Custer.
	April 1, 1863	Timothy H. O'Sullivan	Falmouth, Virginia	Library of Congress	George Custer (left) with General Pleasonton on horseback in Falmouth, Virginia.
	April 1863	William H. Bowlsby	Unknown	D. Mark Katz	Photographs of then Captain George Armstrong Custer posing for William H. Bowlsby of Monroe, Michigan.
	April 1863	William H. Bowlsby	Unknown	Dr. Lawrence A. Frost	Photographs of then Captain George Armstrong Custer posing for William H. Bowlsby of Monroe, Michigan.
	April 1863	Henry Ulke	Washington D.C.	George Nas	A carte de visite of Captain Leroy S. Elbert and George Armstrong Custer.
	June 1863	Timothy H. O'Sullivan	Falmouth, Virginia	D. Mark Katz	George Custer at Pleasonton's camp on horseback.
	September 1863	William Frank Browne	Virginia	Heritage Auction Gallery	Half plate ambrotype of George Armstrong Custer in a Brigadier General Uniform.
	October 8, 1863	Matthew Brady	New York	National Archives, Dale Anderson and Karl Rommel	photographs of Brigadier General George Custer circa 1863.
	October 9, 1863	Timothy H. O'Sullivan and Alexander Gardner	Warrenton, Virginia	David Hack and Lloyd Ostendorf	George A. Custer and Alfred Pleasonton sitting together in Autumn 1863.
	October 9, 1863	Timothy H. O'Sullivan and Alexander Gardner	Warrenton, Virginia	David Hack and Lloyd Ostendorf	Major General Alfred Pleasanton and His Personal Aids with General George Armstrong Custer.
	January 25, 1864	William Frank Browne	Washington D.C.	Karl Rommel	Brigadier General Custer a month before his marriage.
	February 1864	Unknown photographer	Stevensburg, Virginia	Custer Battlefield National Monument	George Custer at the headquarters of the Michigan Cavalry Brigade.
	February 15, 1864	Matthew Brady	New York	Darryl Lyons	A carte de visite of brigadier general George A. Custer.
	February 15, 1864	Matthew Brady	New York	Chester E. Nelson	George Custer in 1864 with the caption "Custer".
	February 15, 1864	Matthew Brady	New York	Lloyd Ostendorf	George A. Custer in New York taken by Matthew Brady & Co.
	February 15, 1864	Matthew Brady	New York	D. Mark Katz	George A. Custer in New York taken by Matthew Brady & Co.
	February 15, 1864	Matthew Brady	New York	Unknown	George A. Custer in New York taken by Matthew Brady & Co.
	February 15, 1864	Matthew Brady	New York	National Archives	George A. Custer in New York taken by Matthew Brady & Co.
	February 15, 1864	Matthew Brady	Pennsylvania Avenue, Washington D.C.	Library of Congress	Lieutenant Colonel George Custer with his wife recent wed wife, Elizabeth "Libbie" Bacon Custer.
	May 1, 1864	Matthew Brady & Co.	Washington D.C.	National Archives	Brigadier general George A. Custer in May 1864.
	July 11, 1864	Unknown photographer	Virginia Peninsula	Library of Congress	An undated photograph of First Lieutenant George Custer with a dog.
	August 8, 1864	Jesse H. Whitehurst	Washington D.C.	Harrison County Historical Society	A signed photograph of Brigadier General George A. Custer taken by M.J. Powers, an employee of Jesse H. Whitehurst.
	October 22, 1864	Matthew Brady	New York	Dr. Lawrence A. Frost	George A. Custer with his wife Elizabeth Bacon.
	October 23, 1864	Matthew Brady	New York	New York Public Library	George A. Custer with his wife Elizabeth Bacon.
	October 23, 1864	Matthew Brady	New York	New York Public Library	Ms. Cora Bean, George Armstrong Custer and Elizabeth Bacon Custer Seated with an Open Book.
	October 23, 1864	Matthew Brady	New York	National Archives	Brigadier General George A. Custer circa October 1864.
	October 23, 1864	Matthew Brady	New York	Unknown	8 photographs of George Armstrong Custer.
	October 23, 1864	Matthew Brady	Washington D.C.	National Park Services	A Long Bust View of Brigadier General George Armstrong Custer in Military Uniform.
	December 25, 1864	William H. Boulsby	Near Winchester, Virginia	National Park Service	George Custer and a Group on the Porch Major General George Armstrong Custer's Headquarters Near Winchester, Virginia.
	1865	Matthew Brady	Washington D.C.	National Archives	George Custer having his photo taken by Matthew Brady in 1865.
	January 2, 1865	Alexander Gardener	Unknown	D. Mark Katz	A carte de visite taken by Major General George A. Custer.
	January 2, 1865	Alexander Gardener	Washington D.C.	D. Mark Katz	George Custer with Gen. Philip Sheridan and his staff.
	January 3, 1865	Matthew Brady	Washington D.C.	Library of Congress	George Armstrong Custer in 1865.
	January 3, 1865	Matthew Brady	Washington D.C.	Library of Congress	George Custer with Union generals P. H. Sheridan, Lewis Merritt, James A. Forsyth and Thomas Devin.
	January 3, 1865	Matthew Brady	Washington D.C.	D. Mark Katz	Major general George Custer with his wife Elizabeth and brother, second Lieutenant Thomas Ward Custer.
	January 3, 1865	Matthew Brady	Washington D.C.	Dr. Lawrence A. Frost	Head portrait of Maj. Gen George Custer.
	January 3, 1865	Matthew Brady	Washington D.C.	Library of Congress	carte de visite of Maj. Gen. George Custer.
	January 3, 1865	Matthew Brady	Washington D.C.	D. Mark Katz	carte de visite of Maj. Gen. George Custer.
	January 4, 1865	Matthew Brady	Unknown	Dale Anderson	unpublished photographs of Major General George Armstrong Custer.
	January 4, 1865	Matthew Brady	Unknown	D. Mark Katz	unpublished photographs of Major General George Armstrong Custer.
	January 4, 1865	Matthew Brady	Unknown	Unknown	unpublished photographs of Major General George Armstrong Custer.
	January 4, 1865	Matthew Brady	Unknown	National Archives	unpublished photographs of Major General George Armstrong Custer.
	January 4, 1865	Matthew Brady	Unknown	Library of Congress	A signed Cartes de visite of Major General George Custer. The photograph was purchased in 2015 by Thomas Harris, who donated it to the Liljenquist Family, who then donated it to the Library of Congress.
	April 12, 1865	William Frank Browne	Unknown	Custer Battlefield National Monument	George Custer, his wife and an unknown African-American woman pose for a photograph.
	April 12, 1865	William Frank Browne	Unknown	Dr. Lawrence A. Frost	Maj. Gen. George A. Custer with his wife Elizabeth.
	April 12, 1865	William Frank Browne	Unknown	Custer Battlefield National Monument	Maj. Gen. George A. Custer, his wife Elizabeth and an unidentified soldier in Custer's brigade.
	April 15, 1865	Matthew Brady	Washington D.C.	Library of Congress	Portrait of Maj. Gen. (as of Apr. 15, 1865) George A. Custer, officer of the Federal Army.
	May 1865	John Goldin	Washington D.C.	Library of Congress	A carte de visite of Major General George A. Custer taken by John Goldin.
	May 1865	John Goldin	Washington D.C.	United States Army Military History Institute	A carte de visite of Major General George A. Custer taken by John Goldin.
	May 1865	John Goldin	Washington D.C.	Dale Anderson	Major General George Custer in 1865.
	May 1865	Matthew Brady	Washington D.C.	D. Mark Katz	Major General George Custer in 1865.
	May 1865	Matthew Brady	Washington D.C.	Library of Congress	Major General George Custer in 1865.
	May 1865	John Goldin	Washington D.C.	Unknown	George Armstrong Custer pictured as a one-star General.
	May 1865	John Goldin	Washington D.C.	Dale Anderson	A carte de visite of George Custer published by the Peck Brothers of New Haven, Connecticut.
	May 1865	John Goldin	Washington D.C.	John W. Painter	A carte de visite of George A. Custer in 1865.
	May 1865	John Goldin	Washington D.C.	Dale Anderson	A carte de visite of George A. Custer wearing a hat.
	May 1865	Matthew Brady	Washington D.C.	Craig Haffner	A carte de visite of Major General George A. Custer, there is another proof carte de visite is in the collection of Dale Anderson.
	May 1865	Matthew Brady	Washington D.C.	National Archives	A multiple-lens collodian carte de visite negative of George Custer.
	May 23, 1865	George L. Andrews	South Dakota	National Archives	A famous photograph of Custer, Custer had this photograph hung at Fort Abraham Lincoln, Dakota Territory.
	May 23, 1865	Matthew Brady	Washington D.C.	Library of Congress	A photograph taken by Matthew Brady and his staff.
	May 23, 1865	Matthew Brady	Washington D.C.	Darryl Lyons	A photograph taken by Matthew Brady and his staff.
	May 23, 1865	E & H.T. Anthony	Washington D.C.	Henry Orgel	George A. Custer at the Grand Review of the Armies riding atop his racehorse Don Juan.
	July 1865	Unknown photographer	New Orleans, Louisiana	Private collector	A tintype photograph of Maj. Gen. George A. Custer while he was in Louisiana.
	October 18, 1865	Unknown photographer	Hempstead, Texas	West Point Library	George Custer with his wife on horseback in Texas.
	October 18, 1865	Unknown photographer	Hempstead, Texas	Custer Battlefield National Monument	George Custer with his wife on horseback in Texas.
	October 18, 1865	Unknown photographer	Hempstead, Texas	Dr. Ronald Bill	George A. Custer with his wife, Elizabeth with a kepi.
	November 1865	Unknown photographer	Austin, Texas	Custer Battlefield National Monument	Custer with his wife and troops at their headquarters.
	November 1865	Unknown photographer	Austin, Texas	Custer Battlefield National Monument	From left to right: Charles Kendall, two unidentified men, Rebecca and Mary Richmond, Colonel Thomas W. Custer, Major General George Custer and his wife Elizabeth, Emmanuel Custer, Colonel Jacob Greene and an unidentified person.
	September 1866	Unknown photographer	Unknown	D. Mark Katz	A photograph of Custer and his wife with the caption "Gen + Mrs. Custer."
	September 1866	Unknown photographer	Unknown	Henry E. Huntington Library and Art Gallery	From left to right: Wesley Merritt, Albion P. Howe, George A. Custer. Seated: Gouverneur K. Warren, Gideon Welles, Andrew Johnson, Alfred Pleasonton, William H. Seward, Gen. Ulysses S. Grant and David G. Farragut.
	January 1868	Jay Noble & Co.	Leavenworth, Kansas	Michael and Regina Swygert-Smith and the Custer Battlefield National Monument	Rebecca Richmond, Charles Kendall Mrs. Mary Richmond Kendall and Lt. George Custer.
	February 9, 1868	Unknown photographer	Fort Dodge, Kansas	Custer Battlefield National Monument	George Custer with a Full Beard in Winter Uniform, Including Fur Hat and Fringed Buckskin Jacket, Worn During the Washita Campaign.
	March 1868	Unknown photographer	Dundeen, Michigan	Dr. Lawrence A. Frost	A carte de visite of Mrs. Rose Flint, George Custer and his wife and an unknown individual.
	October 1868	Unknown photographer	Arkansas River	Yale University	George Custer with several men of the 7th U.S. Cavalry during the Washita Campaign.
	November 1868	Unknown photographer	Arkansas River	Custer Battlefield National Monument	Custer with several Osage Indian scouts.
	November 1868	William S. Soule	Fort Dodge, Kansas	Custer Battlefield National Monument	George Custer in the Mouth of a Tent with a Spencer repeating rifle and His Dogs and Pet Pelican During the Washita Campaign.
	Summer of 1869	W. J. Phillips	Fort Hays, Kansas	Custer Battlefield National Monument	George Armstrong Custer, Elizabeth Bacon Custer, and Thomas Ward Custer Standing on a Porch Built in Front of a Tent.
	Summer of 1869	W. J. Phillips	Fort Hays, Kansas	Custer Battlefield National Monument	Group Including [left to right] Dr. Dunbar, Elizabeth Bacon Custer, Mr. J. R. Young, Captain Thomas Benton Weir, Nettie Smith, Lieutenant Colonel George Armstrong Custer, Mr. Lamborn, Mary McIntosh, and Lieutenant Francis M. Gibson, in Front of General Geo.
	September 1869	W. J. Phillips	Big Creek, Kansas	Custer Battlefield National Monument	A buffalo hunt, from left to right: an orderly, Lt. Henry J. Nowlan, Hill P. Wilson, Cpt. Thomas Weir, 1st Lt. James M. Bell, 2nd Lt. Francis M. Gibson, George Custer, Cpt. Frederick Benteen, 1st Lt. Thomas Custer, Cpt. William Thompson and Charley Thompson.
	September 1869	W. J. Phillips	Big Creek, Kansas	Custer Battlefield National Monument	Buffalo hunt, from left to right: George Custer, Miss Talmadge, Cpt. William Thompson, Lord Waterpark, Lord Paget, Lt. Myles Moylan, Cpt. Thomas Weir, Samuel D. Sturgis, Lt. William W. Cooke, Elizabeth Bacon, Lt. Thomas Custer, Cpt. Brewster, Mrs. Godfrey, Mr. Talmadge.
	September 1869	W. J. Phillips	Big Creek, Kansas	Custer Battlefield National Monument	A photograph of George Custer (far left) with a group of people buffalo hunting.
	December 1869	Matthew Brady	Unknown	Library of Congress	George Custer in civilian clothing having his photo taken by Matthew Brady and was purchased by Alice H. Cox and Mary H. Evans in 1954.
	December 1869	Matthew Brady	Unknown	National Archives	George Custer in civilian clothing having his photo taken by Matthew Brady and was purchased by Alice H. Cox and Mary H. Evans in 1954.
	July 4, 1871	Simon Wing	Monroe, Michigan	Monroe County Historical Commission	George Custer with several veterans of the War of 1812: John Beshear, John Clapper, George Armstrong Custer, Francis Lazarre, Jean DeChovin, John B. Beaseau, George Younglove, Fred Boroff, David Van Pelt, Louis Jacobs, Charles Hixon, Henry Mason, Thomas Whelpley, Joseph Guyor, Peter Navarre, James B. Nadeau, Emmanuel Custer, Robert F. Navarre, Joseph Foulke, Bronson French.
	January 1872	E. L. Eaton	Kansas	Kansas State Historical Society	an albumen print of George Custer.
	January 1872	D. E. Powers	Kansas	William M. Lentz Jr.	George Custer at a tent with Spotted Tail.
	January 22, 1872	J. Lee Knight	Washington D.C.	Custer Battlefield National Monument	Hunting party from left to right: Frank Thompson, Dr. Condrin, Col. George Alexander Forsyth, Count Olsonfieff, Major M. V. Asche, Col. Nelson Bowman Sweitzer, and Lt. Tudor. Seated from left to right: Consul Bodisco, Chancellor Machin, Lt. Gen. Phillip H. Sheridan, Grand Duke Alexei Alexandrovich, Admiral Possiet and George A. Custer. Seated on floor from left to right: Lt. Col. James William Forsyth, Lt. Sterlegoff and Lt. Col. Michael Vincent Sheridan.
	January 22, 1872	J. Lee Knight	Washington D.C.	Custer Battlefield National Monument	George Custer with Phillip H. Sheridan and his staff.
	January 22, 1872	John A. Scholten	Saint Louis, Missouri	Andrew Monte	George Custer Wearing a Fur-Collared Coat in Saint Louis, Missouri.
	January 23, 1872	John A. Scholten	Saint Louis, Missouri	Library of Congress	George Custer in Hunting gear with a rifle, sits next to Grand Duke Alexei Alexandrovich of Russia who invited Custer to join him for a hunting party on 13 January 1872.
	January 23, 1872	John A. Scholten	Saint Louis, Missouri	Yale University	A photograph of George Custer wearing a Fringed Buckskins hunting outfit and wielding a breech loading rifle.
	January 24, 1872	John A. Scholten	Saint Louis, Missouri	Custer Battlefield National Monument	Two photographs of Custer wearing a fur coat over a suit.
	March 1873	Bingham and Craver	Memphis, Tennessee	Monroe County Historical Commission	A photograph of George Custer wearing a military uniform.
	September 6, 1873	William R. Pywell	Yellowstone, Montana	Wilfred Thompson	Lieutenant colonel George Custer with the "King of the Forest" at Yellowstone.
	November 1873	Orlando S. Goff	Fort Abraham Lincoln, Dakota Territory	Custer Battlefield National Monument	photograph of a group on the front steps of the Custer residence at Fort Lincoln.
	November 1873	Orlando Scott Goff	Fort Abraham Lincoln, Dakota Territory	Yale University	Custer and his wife at Fort Abraham Lincoln with the caption, "Gen Custers smuggery at Fort Lincoln, Dakota."
	June 1874	Huntington & Taylor	St. Paul, Minnesota	Custer Battlefield National Monument	Brigadier General George Custer, in civilian clothes. This photo portrait was reportedly taken during his honeymoon, in February 1864.
	August 1874	William H. Illingsworth	Montana Territory	Custer Battlefield National Monument	George Custer with Native American scouts including Bloody Knife (kneeling left), He often ate with them. A diary entry in May 1876 by Kellogg records, "General Custer visits scouts; much at home amongst them."
	August 7, 1874	William H. Illingsworth	Dakota Territory or Montana Territory	National Archives and Records Administration	George Custer during Black Hills expedition with the caption, "Our First Grizzly, killed by Gen. Custer and Col. Ludlow." (Left to right: Bloody Knife, George Armstrong Custer, Private John Noonan, and Captain William Ludlow).
	August 13, 1874	William H. Illingsworth	Dakota Territory or Montana Territory	Dr. Lawerence A. Frost	Custer with his officers and scientific corps during Black Hills expedition.
	November 1874	Unknown	Monroe, Michigan	Dr. Lawerence A. Frost	A tintype of George Custer purportedly with the Bates sisters, Agnes Wellington and Nellie Wadsworth.
	November 8, 1874	W. H. Illingworth	Unknown	National Park Services	Lieutenant Colonel George Custer in Civilian Dress.
	May 8, 1875	Edward M. Estabrooke	New York City, New York	Custer Battlefield National Monument	A tintype of George Custer holding a hat in civilian clothing.
	May 8, 1875	Edward M. Estabrooke	New York City, New York	Custer Battlefield National Monument	George Custer in Civilian Dress with Three Women.
	May 8, 1875	Edward M. Estabrooke	New York City, New York	Custer Battlefield National Monument	A cabinet card of Custer in civilian clothes.
	Summer of 1875	Orlando Scott Goff	Fort Abraham Lincoln, Dakota Territory	Custer Battlefield National Monument	Miss Agnes Bates and General George Armstrong Custer in the Costumes of a Sioux Chief and His Bride Reclining.
	Summer of 1875	Orlando Scott Goff	Fort Abraham Lincoln, Dakota Territory	Custer Battlefield National Monument	George Custer and His Sister Mrs Margaret C. Calhoun Dressed as Quaker Peace Commissioners.
	Summer of 1875	Orlando Scott Goff	Fort Abraham Lincoln, Dakota Territory	Custer Battlefield National Monument	George Custer and His Sister Mrs Margaret C. Calhoun Dressed as Quaker Peace Commissioners with Mrs. Agnes Bates dressed as a Sioux chief.
	July 1875	Unknown photographer	Fort Abraham Lincoln, Dakota Territory	National Archives and Records Administration	Hunting and camping party near Fort Abraham Lincoln, 1875. An illustration of the variety of uniforms worn by Cavalry Regiments in the west. From left to right: Lt. James Calhoun, Mr. Swett, Capt. Stephen Baker, Boston Custer, Lt. Winfield Scott Edgerly, Miss Watson, Capt. Myles Walter Keogh, Mrs. Maggie Calhoun, Mrs. Elizabeth Custer, Lt. Col. George Custer, Dr. H.O. Paulding, Mrs. Henrietta Smith, Dr. George Edwin Lord, Capt. Thomas Bell Weir, Lt. William Winer Cooke, Lt. R.E. Thompson, Miss ; Wadsworth, another Miss Wadsworth, Capt. Thomas Custer and Lt. Algernon Emery Smith.
	July 1875	Orlando Scott Goff	Fort Abraham Lincoln, North Dakota	Custer Battlefield National Monument	Custer's headquarters in the Dakota Territory.
	Summer of 1875	Orlando Scott Goff	Missouri River	Custer Battlefield National Monument	Custer and a party of men on next to the Missouri River.
	March 1876	José María Mora	New York	Custer Battlefield National Monument	A cabinet photograph of George Custer wearing a suit.
	March 1876	José María Mora	New York	Andrew Monte	A cabinet photograph of George Custer wearing a suit.
	March 1876	José María Mora	New York City	Darryl Lyons	Lt. Col. George Custer in uniform.
	March 1876	José María Mora	New York City	Cowan's Auction	A albumen cabinet card pose of Custer as lieutenant general taken only about three months before his death at the Little Big Horn.
	April 23, 1876	William R. Howell	New York	Darryl Lyons	The last photographs of George Custer taken a month before his death.
	April 23, 1876	William R. Howell	New York	Custer Battlefield National Monument	The last photographs of George Custer taken a month before his death.
	April 23, 1876	William R. Howell	New York	Arthur Strawbridge	The last photographs of George Custer taken a month before his death.
