= Maud Branscombe =

English actress and model (b. 1854)

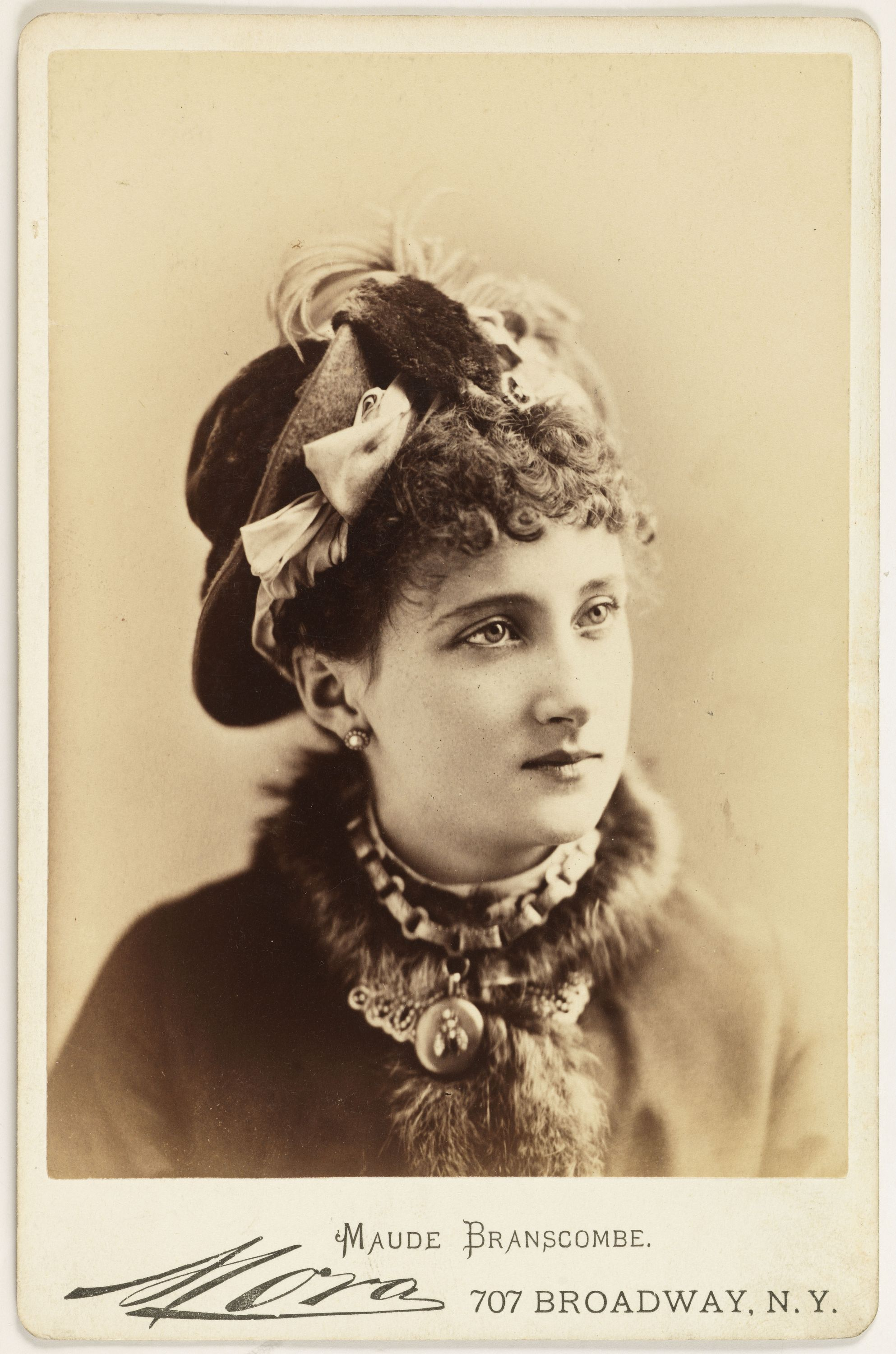

Maud Branscombe (1854-1910) was an English actress and photographer's model whose photographs were used for artist's models, advertising and cigarette cards. She is called a ‘professional beauty’ in James Joyce’s Ulysses.

== Life ==
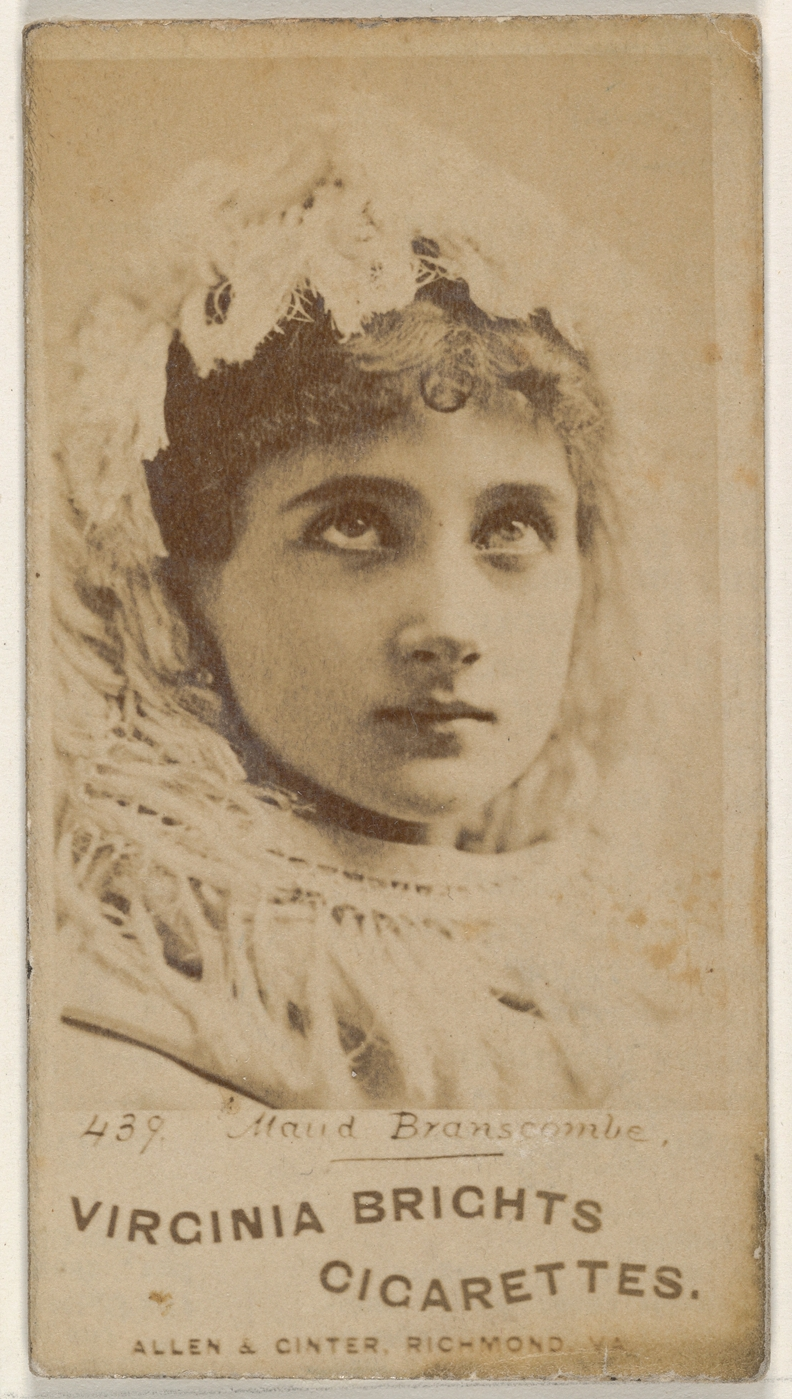
Maud Branscombe depicted on cigarette cards

She was born Clara Amelia Branscombe in Exeter in 1854 to the vicar choral of Exeter Cathedral, and worked as an artist's model in her teens. She pursued an acting career in England and the USA, where she was popularised by photographer José Maria Mora and subsequently became a highly-sought after model.

Branscombe's ability to pose, including in imitation of famous statues, was praised, and her best attribute was said to be her eyes. 28,000 copies of her photograph were sold in 1877 alone. She appeared on cigarette card series depicting the world’s beauties by Allen & Ginter and Duke, Sons & Co.

She first married in Canada in 1876. After returning to England in 1882, she married Victor Champion, a pianist and conductor, in 1886.

In 1895 she was working as a stenographer when she returned to public notice for taking her employer, Alexander Hamilton Gunn, to court for threats and assault.
