= List of photographs of Abraham Lincoln =

Abraham Lincoln was "the most photographed American of the 19th century". There are at least 130 known photographs of Lincoln, and he was photographed multiple times by the American Civil War photographers Mathew Brady and Alexander Gardner who were officially appointed to document the war. In reference to Brady's 1860 photograph, Lincoln said, “Brady and the Cooper Institute made me President.” John George Nicolay, who was Lincoln's private secretary when Lincoln became President, is quoted as saying: "Lincoln's features were the despair of every artist who undertook his portrait. ... There are many pictures of Lincoln; there is no portrait of him."

Image	Date	Photographer	Location	Technique	Owner	Notes
	1846 or 1847	Nicholas H. Shepherd	Springfield, Illinois	Daguerreotype, quarter plate	Library of Congress	This daguerreotype is the earliest confirmed photographic image of Abraham Lincoln. It was reportedly made in 1846 by Nicholas H. Shepherd shortly after Lincoln was elected to the United States House of Representatives. Shepherd's Daguerreotype Miniature Gallery, which he advertised in the Sangamo Journal, was located in Springfield over the drug store of J. Brookie. Shepherd also studied law at the law office of Lincoln and Herndon.
	October 27, 1854	Johan Carl Frederic Polycarpus Von Schneidau	Chicago, Illinois	Gelatin silver print of a presumed lost daguerreotype	Library of Congress	The second earliest known photograph of Lincoln. From a photograph owned originally by George Schneider, former editor of the Illinois Staats-Zeitung, the most influential anti-slavery German newspaper of the West. Mr. Schneider first met Mr. Lincoln in 1853, in Springfield. "He was already a man necessary to know", says Mr. Schneider. In 1854 Mr. Lincoln was in Chicago, and Isaac N. Arnold invited Mr. Schneider to dine with Mr. Lincoln. After dinner, as the gentlemen were going down town, they stopped at an itinerant photograph gallery, and Mr. Lincoln had this picture taken for Mr. Schneider.
	February 28, 1857	Alexander Hessler	Chicago, Illinois	Gelatin silver print from the lost original negative	Library of Congress	I have a letter from Mr. Hesler stating that [Lincoln] came in and made arrangements for the sitting, so that the members of the bar could get prints. Lincoln said at the time that he did not know why the boys wanted such a homely face. Joseph Medill went with Mr. Lincoln to have the picture taken. He says that the photographer insisted on smoothing down Lincoln's hair, but Lincoln did not like the result, and ran his fingers through it before sitting. — H. W. Fay of DeKalb, Illinois, original owner of the photo Lincoln immediately prior to his Senate nomination. The original negative was burned in the Great Chicago Fire.
	May 27, 1857	Amon T. Joslin	Danville, Illinois	Ambrotype	Lincoln Financial Foundation Collection, Allen County Public Library	Although some historians have dated this photograph during the court session of November 13, 1859, and others have placed it as early as 1853, most authorities now believe it was taken on May 27, 1857. The photographer Amon T. Joslin owned "Joslin's Gallery" located on the second floor of a building adjoining the Woodbury Drug Store, in Danville, IL. This was one of Lincoln's favorite stopping places in Vermilion County, Illinois, while he was a traveling lawyer. Joslin photographed Abraham Lincoln twice at this sitting. Lincoln kept one copy and gave the other to his friend, Thomas J. Hilyard, deputy sheriff of Vermilion County. Today, one original resides in the Illinois State Historical Library.
	October 1, 1858	Calvin Jackson	Pittsfield, Illinois	Ambrotypes	Library of Congress	A head-and-shoulders portrait of Lincoln, facing slightly left, taken in Pittsfield, Illinois, two weeks before the final Lincoln-Douglas debate in Lincoln's unsuccessful bid for the Senate.
	1858	Roderick M. Cole	Peoria, Illinois	Daguerreotype (?)	Benjamin Shapell Family Manuscript Foundation	... the Photo you have of Abraham Lincoln is a copy of a Daguerreotype, that I made in my gallery in this city [Peoria] during the Lincoln and Douglas campaign. I invited him to my gallery to give me a sitting ... and when I had my plate ready, he said to me, 'I cannot see why all you artists want a likeness of me unless it is because I am the homeliest man in the State of Illinois.'" — R.M. Cole, July 3, 1905, letter to David McCulloch Lincoln liked this image and often signed photographic prints for admirers. In fact, in 1861, he even gave a copy to his stepmother. The image was extensively employed on campaign ribbons in the 1860 Presidential campaign, and Lincoln "often signed photographic prints for visitors."
	1858	unknown	unknown	tintype	Library of Congress	A faded photo of Lincoln, frequently reproduced on presidential campaign ribbins in 1860. Lincoln reportedly liked the photograph and often signed prints for admirers.
	1858 (?)	Fetter's Picture Gallery	unknown	Ninth-plate ambrotype	National Portrait Gallery	A photo taken of Lincoln by the Fetter's Picture Gallery.
	1858 (?)	unknown	unknown	Tintype	National Lincoln Museum (Old Ford's Theatre)	This is the only extant original tintype of Lincoln.
	1858 (?)	unknown	Ohio (?)	Photographic copy of a lost daguerreotype	Anthony L. Maresh collection	A Civil War soldier from Parma, Ohio, was the original owner of this portrait, published in the Cleveland Plain Dealer on February 12, 1942, from a print in the Anthony L. Maresh collection. Possibly it is a photographic copy of one of two daguerreotypes, both now lost, taken in Ohio.
	1858 (?)	unknown	Springfield, Illinois	ambrotype	Abraham Lincoln Presidential Library and Museum	During Lincoln's debates with Stephen Douglas, Abraham Lincoln took this photo in western Illinois. Years later during the Civil War, he gave this photo to Charles Lamb.
	1858 (?)	unknown	Springfield, Illinois	Photographic copy	unknown	In 1858, Lincoln squared off against Stephen Douglas for Illinois' Senate seat. The battle sparked seven heated debates on slavery. Here, supporters gather outside Lincoln's Springfield home. Lincoln is the tall, white figure by the doorway.
	May 7, 1858	Abraham M. Byers	Beardstown, Illinois	Ambrotype	University of Nebraska	Formerly in the Lincoln Monument collection at Springfield, Illinois. Mr. Lincoln wore a linen coat on the occasion. The picture is regarded as a good likeness of him as he appeared during the Lincoln Douglas campaign.
	May 7, 1858	Abraham M. Byers	Beardstown, Illinois	Ambrotype	University of Nebraska	
	April 25, 1858	Samuel G. Alschuler	Urbana, Illinois	Ambrotype	Library of Congress	At the time I was [a young] clerk of the circuit court, and was about as well acquainted with Mr. Lincoln as with most of the forty-odd lawyers who practiced law in the circuit ... On the opening day of court, which was always an interesting occasion, largely because we were curious to see what attorneys from a distance were in attendance ... I observed that Mr. Lincoln was among them; and as I looked in his direction, he arose from his seat, and came forward and gave me a cordial hand-shake, accompanying the action with words of congratulation on my election. I mention this fact because the conduct of Mr. Lincoln was so in contrast with that of the other members of the bar that it touched me deeply, and made me, ever afterwards, his steadfast friend." — C. F. Gunther of Chicago, circa 1896 Letter One morning I was in the gallery of Mr. Alschuler, when Mr. Lincoln came into the room and said he had been informed that he (Alschuler) wished him to sit for a picture. Alschuler said he had sent such a message to Mr. Lincoln, but he could not take the picture in that coat (referring to a linen duster in which Mr. Lincoln was clad), and asked if he had not a dark coat in which he could sit. Mr. Lincoln said he had not; that this was the only coat he had brought with him from his home. Alschuler said he could wear his coat, and gave it to Mr. Lincoln, who pulled off the duster and put on the artist's coat. Alschuler was a very short man, with short arms, but with a body nearly as large as the body of Mr. Lincoln. The arms of the latter extended through the sleeves of the coat of Alschuler a quarter of a yard, making him quite ludicrous, at which he (Lincoln) laughed immoderately, and sat down for the picture to be taken with an effort at being sober enough for the occasion. The lips in the picture show this." — Mr. J. O. Cunningham, present when the picture was taken
	July 18, 1858	Preston Butler	Springfield, Illinois	Gelatin silver print of a lost carbon enlargement of the lost ambrotype	Library of Congress	This image was presumably taken by Preston Butler the day after Lincoln delivered a speech in Springfield in which Lincoln urges that slavery be placed on the course of "ultimate extinction". He attacks Stephen Douglas and defends himself by stating that he supports the principles of equality put forth in the Declaration of Independence. This speech preceded his debates with Douglas.
	August 26, 1858	T. P. Pearson	Macomb, Illinois	Ambrotype	Library of Congress	Mr. Magie happened to remain over night at Macomb, at the same hotel with Mr. Lincoln, and the next morning took a walk about town, and upon Mr. Magie's invitation they stepped into Mr. Pierson's establishment, and the ambrotype of which this is a copy was the result. Mr. Lincoln, upon entering, looked at the camera as though he was unfamiliar with such an instrument, and then remarked: 'Well, do you want to take a shot at me with this thing?' He was shown to a glass, where he was told to 'fix up,' but declined, saying it would not be much of a likeness if he fixed up any. The old neighbors and acquaintances of Mr. Lincoln in Illinois, upon seeing this picture, are apt to exclaim: 'There! that's the best likeness of Mr. Lincoln that I ever saw!' The dress he wore in this picture is the same in which he made his famous canvass with Senator Douglas." — J. C. Power, custodian of the Lincoln monument in Springfield
	September 26, 1858	attributed to Christopher S. German	Springfield, Illinois	unknown	Chicago History Museum	In 1858 Lincoln and Douglas had a series of joint debates in this State, and this city was one place of meeting. Mr. Lincoln's step-mother was making her home with my father and mother at that time. Mr. Lincoln stopped at our house, and as he was going away my mother said to him: "Uncle Abe, I want a picture of you." He replied, "Well, Harriet, when I get home I will have one taken for you and send it to you." Soon after, mother received the photograph, which she still has, already framed, from Springfield, Illinois, with a letter from Mr. Lincoln, in which he said, "This is not a very good-looking picture, but it's the best that could be produced from the poor subject." He also said that he had it taken solely for my mother." — Mr. K. N. Chapman of Charleston, Illinois, great-grandson of Sarah Bush Lincoln
	October 1, 1858	Calvin Jackson	Pittsfield, Illinois	Ambrotype	Library of Congress	On the afternoon of Friday, October 1, 1858, Lincoln had a luncheon at the home of his attorney friend, Daniel H. Gilmer in Pittsfield, Illinois. Lincoln then headed across the street to the town square, where he spoke for two hours. Following the address, Lincoln, at the request of Gilmer, went to the portable canvas photo gallery of Calvin Jackson on the northeast corner of the square and sat for two ambrotype poses. The photos were soon processed, but one was not finished, probably because it had been overexposed. Lincoln requested that copies of the other be delivered to two Pittsfield friends the following day.
	October 11, 1858	William Judkins Thomson	Monmouth, Illinois	Ambrotype	National Portrait Gallery, Smithsonian Institution	This ambrotype was taken two days before the next to last debate with Douglas in Quincy, Illinois.
	1859 (?)	unknown	Springfield, Illinois	unknown	unknown	Photograph, of unknown origin, shows Abraham Lincoln in Springfield, Illinois, probably in 1859.
	October 4, 1859	Samuel M. Fassett	Chicago, Illinois	Photograph	Negative destroyed in Great Chicago Fire	Lincoln sat for this portrait at the gallery of Cooke and Fassett in Chicago. Cooke wrote in 1865 "Mrs. Lincoln pronounced [it] the best likeness she had ever seen of her husband."
	1860 (?)	George Clark Jr.	Boston, Massachusetts	Ambrotype	National Portrait Gallery	Lincoln in Boston circa 1860. "For Present, Hon. Abraham Lincoln. Manufactured by Geo. Clark Jr. & Co. Ambrotype artist, No. 59 Court Street. Boston."
	February 27, 1860	Mathew Brady	New York, New York	Carte-de-visite printed by Brady's gallery from a lost copy negative of a retouched original print	Library of Congress	Mathew Brady's first photograph of Lincoln, on the day of the Cooper Union speech. Over the following weeks, newspapers and magazines gave full accounts of the event, noting the high spirits of the crowd and the stirring rhetoric of the speaker. Artists for Harper's Weekly converted Brady's photograph to a full-page woodcut portrait to illustrate their story of Lincoln's triumph, and in October 1860, Leslie's Weekly used the same image to illustrate a story about the election. Brady himself sold many carte-de-visite photographs of the Illinois politician who had captured the eye of the nation. Brady remembered that he drew Lincoln's collar up high to improve his appearance; subsequent versions of this famous portrait also show that artists smoothed Lincoln's hair, smoothed facial lines and straightened his subject's "roving" left eye. After Lincoln secured the Republican nomination and the presidency, he gave credit to his Cooper Union speech and this portrait, saying, "Brady and the Cooper Institute made me President."
	1860 (Spring or Summer)	unknown	Illinois (?)	unknown	Library of Congress	Contemporary albumen print believed to be the only surviving likeness printed from the lost original negative made by an unknown photographer, probably in Springfield or Chicago, during the spring or summer of 1860.
	summer of 1860	unknown	Springfield, Illinois	photograph	Ida M. Tarbell Collection, 1890-1944, Pelletier Library Allegheny College	A photograph of Abraham taken during the Summer of 1860 with the caption "Long-hidden profile photograph by an unknown cameraman, Springfield, summer of 1860." Another print of this image was found among the belongings of the painter John Henry Brown, whose watercolor miniature of Lincoln hangs in the National Portrait Gallery.
	summer of 1860	John Adams Whipple	Springfield, Illinois	photograph	unknown	The Lincoln family home in Springfield at the corner of Eighth and Jackson Streets. Abraham Lincoln is standing inside the fence with Willie beside him. Tad Lincoln is barely visible peeking around the fencepost. This photograph was taken in the summer of 1860, shortly after Lincoln’s nomination as the Republican presidential candidate.
	summer of 1860	John Adams Whipple	Springfield, Illinois	photograph	unknown	This photo clearly shows Abraham Lincoln and his son Willie standing behind the fence. A close look reveals that the youngest son Tad is peaking from behind the corner post. The identity of the people in front on the walkway is not known.
	summer of 1860	John Adams Whipple	Springfield, Illinois	photograph	unknown	Abraham Lincoln with Willie and Isaac Diller, one of Willie's playmates. Diller recalled about this photo, “I ran across the street from my aunt’s house to get in a free picture with the Lincolns, but I turned my head at the wrong moment to look at a farm wagon. Only the stripes on my socks and my boots showed up.”
	May 9, 1860	Edward A. Barnwell	Decatur, Illinois	Positive printed on glass from a lost original negative or ambrotype	Decatur Public Library	Abraham Lincoln was in Decatur to attend the Illinois State Republican Convention. Local photographer Edward A. Barnwell wanted to take a picture of "the biggest man" at the convention and invited Lincoln to his People's Ambrotype Gallery at 24 North Water Street to pose for this portrait. The next day, after Richard Oglesby introduced the "Rail Splitter", convention delegates unanimously endorsed Lincoln for President. On May 18 the National Republican Convention meeting in Chicago nominated him as the party's candidate.
	May 20, 1860	William Marsh	Springfield, Illinois	Gelatin silver print copy from the original ambrotype	Library of Congress	Presidential candidate Abraham Lincoln in Springfield, Illinois, two days after he won his party's nomination.
	May 20, 1860	William Marsh	Springfield, Illinois	Salt print from glass negative	Metropolitan Museum of Art	One of five photographs taken by William Marsh for Marcus Lawrence Ward. Although many in the East had read Lincoln's impassioned speeches, few had actually seen the Representative from Illinois.
	June 3, 1860	Alexander Hesler	Springfield, Illinois	Photograph	Library of Congress	Hesler took a total of four portraits at this sitting. Lincoln's law partner William Herndon wrote of this picture: "There is the peculiar curve of the lower lip, the lone mole on the right cheek, and a pose of the head so essentially Lincolnian; no other artist has ever caught it."
	June 3, 1860	Alexander Hesler	Springfield, Illinois	Photograph	Museum of Fine Arts, Boston	When Lincoln saw this photograph, along with his side view portrait from the same sitting, he remarked "That looks better and expresses me better than any I have ever seen; if it pleases the people I am satisfied."
	June 3, 1860	Alexander Hesler	Springfield, Illinois	Photograph	Library of Congress	Lincoln and a Chicago reporter were looking at what is believed to this photo at Lincoln's home shortly after his nomination for president, when he observed "That picture gives a very fair representation of my homely face."
	June 1860	unknown	Springfield, Illinois	Halftone print, from an albumen print from the lost original negative.	unknown	In the summer of 1860 Mr. M. C. Tuttle, a photographer of St. Paul, wrote to Mr. Lincoln, requesting that he have a negative taken and sent to him for local use in the campaign. The request was granted, but the negative was broken in transit. On learning of the accident, Mr. Lincoln sat again, and with the second negative he sent a jocular note wherein he referred to the fact, disclosed by the picture, that in the interval he had "got a new coat". A few copies of the picture were made by Mr. Tuttle, and distributed among the Republican editors of the State.
	1860 (summer)	William Seavey	Springfield, Illinois	Photograph	unknown	After this single print was made, the negative was lost when a fire destroyed the photographer's gallery.
	1860 (spring or summer)	unknown	Springfield, Illinois	Contemporary albumen print believed to be the only surviving likeness printed from the lost original negative	Library of Congress	A study of Lincoln's powerful physique, this full-length photograph was taken for use by sculptor Henry Kirke Brown, and was found among his effects in 1931.
	1860 (spring or summer)	William Shaw	Chicago or Springfield, Illinois	Albumen print from a lost contemporary negative	Chicago Sun-Times Archives	This image has been heavily retouched at some point. Lincoln's neck, skin and cheek lines are smoothed out, and the bag under the right eye has been diminished.
	August 13, 1860	Preston Butler	Springfield, Illinois	Ambrotype plate 5.75 x 4.5 inches	Library of Congress	The last beardless photograph of Lincoln. John M. Read commissioned Philadelphia artist John Henry Brown to paint a good-looking miniature of Lincoln "whether or not the subject justified it". This ambrotype is one of six taken on Monday, August 13, 1860, in Butler's daguerreotype studio (of which only two survive), made for the portrait painter.
	November 25, 1860	Samuel G. Altschuler	Chicago, Illinois	Gelatin silver print of a carte-de-visite print of what appears to have been a retouched contemporary albumen print supposedly from the lost original negative	Library of Congress	An 11-year-old girl named Grace Bedell wrote to Lincoln, asking "let your whiskers grow ... you would look a great deal better for your face is so thin. All the ladies like whiskers and they would tease their husbands to vote for you and then you would be President." and the president-elect responded "As to the whiskers have never worn any do you not think people would call it a silly affection if I were to begin it now?" Regardless, the next time he visited his barber William Florville, he announced "Billy, let's give them a chance to grow." By the time he began his inaugural journey by train from Illinois to Washington, D.C., he had a full beard.
	January 13, 1861	Christopher S. German	Springfield, Illinois	unknown	unknown	
	February 9, 1861	Christopher S. German	Springfield, Illinois	Photograph	Library of Congress	This photograph was taken two days before he left Springfield en route to Washington, DC, for his inauguration.
	February 9, 1861	Christopher S. German	Springfield, Illinois	Tintype from lost negative	Private collection	Taken during the same sitting, this profile reveals the back of Lincoln's head more than perhaps any other portrait.
	February 24, 1861	Alexander Gardner	Washington, D.C.	Albumen silver print	J. Paul Getty Museum	Taken during President-elect Lincoln's first sitting in Washington, D.C., the day after his arrival by train.
	February 24, 1861	Alexander Gardner	Washington, D.C.	Albumen silver print	Library of Congress	Taken during President-elect Lincoln's first sitting in Washington, D.C., the day after his arrival by train.
	March 1, 1861 and June 30, 1861 (between)	unknown	unknown	Salt print from the lost original negative	Christie's	The first photographic image of the new president. Remarkably, it is not known where or by whom this portrait was taken; the few known examples carry imprints of several different photographers: C.D Fredericks & Co. of New York; W.L. Germon and James E. McLees, both of Philadelphia. This example has been termed "the most valuable Lincoln photo in existence" and sold at auction in 2009 for $206,500.
	April 6, 1861	Mathew Brady	Washington, D.C.	Giant imperial photograph from original collodion plate	Library of Congress	Lincoln's drooping left eyelid is clearly visible in this image.
	May 16, 1861	Mathew Brady	Washington, D.C.	Solio print of a lost contemporary albumen print from the lost defective original negative made by an unknown photographer at Mathew Brady's gallery,	Brown Digital Repository	Abraham Lincoln, half-length portrait, seated
	May 16, 1861	Mathew Brady	Washington, D.C.	Carte-de-visite printed from one frame of the lost original multiple-image stereographic negative	Library of Congress	President Abraham Lincoln, seated next to small table, in a reflective pose, May 16, 1861, with his hat visible on the table.
	Late 1861 - Early 1862	Mathew Brady	Washington, D.C.	photograph	National Portrait Gallery	President Lincoln taken by Matthew Brady taken between early 1861 and late 1862.
	February 1862	Mathew Brady	Washington, D.C.	Carte-de-visite	Private collection	Taken soon after the death of Lincoln's son Willie. Governor Joseph W. Fifer of Illinois, after seeing this image, commented "The melancholy seemed to roll from his shoulders and drip from the ends of his fingers."
	October 3, 1862	Alexander Gardner	Antietam, Maryland	Wet collodion glass plate	Library of Congress	Lincoln decided to visit the front after General McClellan hesitated to attack Robert E. Lee. This picture of Lincoln with McClellan and his officers was taken the morning after the President arrived in Antietam.
	October 3, 1862	Alexander Gardner	Antietam, Maryland	Wet collodion glass plate	Library of Congress	Abraham Lincoln at Antietam, with Ward Hill Lamon seated at left.
	October 3, 1862	Alexander Gardner	Antietam, Maryland	Digital file from original wet collodion glass negative	Library of Congress	Lincoln in McClellan's tent after the Battle of Antietam.
	October 3, 1862	Alexander Gardner	Antietam, Maryland	Cropped digital file from original wet collodion glass negative	Library of Congress	Lincoln with Allan Pinkerton and Major General John A. McClernand at Antietam. The photograph was taken in front of the headquarters tent of the U.S. Secret Service.
	October 3, 1862	Alexander Gardner	Antietam, Maryland	Cropped digital file from original wet collodion glass negative	Library of Congress	Lincoln with Allan Pinkerton and Major General John A. McClernand at Antietam.
	April 17, 1863	Thomas Le Mere	Washington, D.C.	Carte de Visite	National Portrait Gallery	Mathew Brady Studios' photograph operator, Thomas Le Mere, thought it would be a "considerable call" to capture a full-length portrait of the President. He did so in this instance with a multiple lens camera in Brady's Gallery.
	1863 (?)	Lewis Emory Walker	Washington, D.C.	Collodion glass negative	Library of Congress	Lincoln, seated, with an unbuttoned coat and wearing his standard gold watch chain, presented to him in 1863 by a California delegation.
	August 9, 1863	Alexander Gardner	Washington, D.C.		Library of Congress	A Portrait by Alexander Gardner, August 9, 1863. An iron stand used to keep the subject immobile is just visible behind Lincoln’s legs.
	August 9, 1863	Alexander Gardner	Washington, D.C.	Mammoth-size albumen portrait from original negative	Christie's Auction, Sale 2272, Lot 86	Lincoln's "Photographer's Face". Per Dr. James Miner, "His large bony face when in repose was unspeakably sad and as unreadable as that of a sphinx, his eyes were as expressionless as those of a dead fish; but when he smiled or laughed at one of his own stories or that of another then everything about him changed; his figure became alert, a lightning change came over his countenance, his eyes scintillated and I thought he had the most expressive features I had ever seen on the face of a man."
	August 9, 1863	Alexander Gardner	Washington, D.C.	Gelatin Silver Print from glass negative	Metropolitan Museum of Art	This is one of a series of six pictures of the President taken by Alexander Gardner on the day before the official opening of his gallery. Lincoln had promised to be Gardner's first sitter and chose Sunday for his visit to avoid "curiosity seekers and other seekers" while on his way to the gallery.
	August 9, 1863	Alexander Gardner	Washington, D.C.	Carte de Visite	Heritage Auctions Lot #43062	Lincoln holds a newspaper in one hand and his eyeglasses in the other in this autographed Carte de Visite.
	August 9, 1863	Alexander Gardner	Washington, D.C.	Carte de Visite	Heritage Auctions Lot #43025	Lincoln seated with hands in lap.
	August 9, 1863	Alexander Gardner	Washington, D.C.	Photograph on paper	Skinner's Auction 2658B, Lot 35	This image from Lincoln's August 1863 sitting with Alexander Gardner in his new studio at 7th and D Street remained in the family of Lincoln's Secretary John Hay until being sold at auction in 2013.
	November 8, 1863	Alexander Gardner	Washington, D.C.	Matte collodion print	Mead Art Museum	This famous image of Lincoln was photographed by Alexander Gardner on November 8, 1863, just weeks before he would deliver the Gettysburg Address. It is sometimes referred to as the "Gettysburg portrait", although it was actually taken in Washington. As Lincoln had previously done in August 1863, he visited Gardner's studio on a Sunday afternoon. He posed for several additional portraits during this session.
	November 8, 1863	Alexander Gardner	Washington, D.C.		Meserve-Kunhardt Foundation	Profile image
	November 8, 1863	Alexander Gardner	Washington, D.C.	Imperial albumen print	Sotheby's, New York, 5 October 2011, N08775, Lot 43	This image emphasizes Lincoln's large, lanky legs.
	November 8, 1863	Alexander Gardner	Washington, D.C.			Lincoln with his two secretaries, John Nicolay (left) and John Hay (right)
	November 19, 1863	David Bachrach	Gettysburg, Pennsylvania.		Library of Congress	Abraham Lincoln at the dedication of the Soldiers' National Cemetery in Gettysburg, Pennsylvania. Lincoln is slightly left of center, just behind the mass of blurry people. The one of two known photographs of Lincoln giving his Gettysburg speech.
	January 8, 1864	Mathew Brady		Reproduced from a positive printed on film from a contemporary negative	National Archives	Lincoln visited Mathew Brady's studio in Washington, D.C., on at least three occasions in 1864. Several portraits survive from each session.
	January 8, 1864	Mathew Brady		Overlay of three stereo images from a multiple image stereographic plate	National Archives	This image is an overlay of three views compiled from a multiple image stereographic plate taken by Brady.
	January 8, 1864	Mathew Brady	Washington D.C.	carte de visite	University Archives	This photo was sold at auction on September 28, 2022 for $1,100.00.
	February 1864	unknown	Philadelphia, Pennsylvania	Albumen silver print	Abraham Lincoln Presidential Museum and Library	A photo of Lincoln in Philadelphia circa 1864.
	February 9, 1864	Anthony Berger	Unknown	Photograph	Library of Congress	"The Penny Profile". Berger was the manager of Mathew Brady's Gallery when he took multiple photographs at this Tuesday sitting. In 1909 Victor David Brenner used this image and one other similar image from this sitting to model the Lincoln cent.
	February 9, 1864	Anthony Berger	Washington D.C.	Tintype	Library of Congress	This photo of Lincoln was used on political campaign buttons for the 1864 Presidential election.
	February 9, 1864	Anthony Berger		Carte de Visite	Heritage Auction #43032	A rare collodion plate of this image in full is housed in the National Archives
	February 9, 1864	Anthony Berger		Imperial albumen print	Heritage Auction #43034	In 1895 Robert Todd Lincoln wrote "I have always thought the Brady photograph of my father, of which I attach a copy, to be the most satisfactory likeness of him."
	February 9, 1864	Anthony Berger	Washington D.C.	Photographic Negative	National Portrait Gallery	A photographs of Abraham Lincoln taken by Anthony Berger.
	February 9, 1864	Anthony Berger		Photograph	National Archives	An original cracked plate, just under the size known as "imperial". The Lincoln portrait on the current United States five-dollar bill is based on this photograph.
	February 9, 1864	Anthony Berger		Photograph	National Archives	Abraham Lincoln with his youngest son Tad. Presumably taken at the same session as the four images just above.
	April 20, 1864	Anthony Berger	Washington D.C.	Photograph	Lincoln National Collection	A 11 x 13 5/8 inch unmounted photograph of Abraham Lincoln, bearded, seated, head and torso, left arm on table with papers; printed from broken glass negative; inscribed on print: To Dr Louis A. Warren, the great Lincoln Scholar, Stefan Lorant.
	April 26, 1864	Anthony Berger	White House, Washington D.C.		The White House Historical Association	Abraham Lincoln in his office and Cabinet Room in the White House.
	February 1865	Lewis Emory Walker	Washington, D.C.	Albumen silver print	National Portrait Gallery	Two photos of Abraham Lincoln taken by Lewis Walker.
	February 1865	Lewis Emory Walker	Washington, D.C.	Albumen silver print	Library of Congress	The short haircut was perhaps suggested by Lincoln's barber to facilitate the taking of his life mask by Clark Mills. Lincoln knew from experience how long hair could cling to plaster. From an 1865 stereograph long attributed to Mathew Brady, was actually taken by Lewis Emory Walker, a government photographer, about February 1865 and published for him by the E. & H. T. Anthony Co., of New York.
	February 5, 1865	Alexander Gardner	Washington, D.C.	Albumen silver print	J. Paul Getty Museum	Abraham Lincoln with his youngest son Tad. Here, Lincoln had also shortened his facial hair, having done so last minute to better facilitate the taking of his life mask by Clark Mills.
	February 5, 1865	Alexander Gardner	Washington, D.C.	Gelatin silver print of a carte-de-visite printed from one frame of the lost original multiple-image stereographic negative.	Library of Congress	President Lincoln visited Gardner's studio accompanied by the American portraitist Matthew Wilson. Wilson had been commissioned to paint the president's portrait, but because Lincoln could spare so little time to pose, the artist needed recent photographs to work from. The pictures served their purpose, but the resulting painting- a traditional, formal, bust-length portrait in an oval format—is not particularly distinguished and hardly remembered today. Gardner's surprisingly candid photographs have proven more enduring, even though they were not originally intended to stand alone as works of art.
	February 5, 1865	Alexander Gardner	Washington, D.C.	Gelatin silver print of a lost period print of the multiple-image stereographic pose	Library of Congress	
	February 5, 1865	Alexander Gardner	Washington, D.C.	Only surviving print from a glass negative that was accidentally cracked during processing and thrown away	National Portrait Gallery	The National Portrait Gallery's photo curator, Frank Goodyear said "...Lincoln has a hint of a smile. The inauguration is a couple of weeks away; he can understand that the war is coming to an end; and here he permits, for one of the first times during his presidency, a hint of better days tomorrow."
	March 4, 1865	Alexander Gardner	Washington, D.C.	photographic print: albumen silver	Library of Congress	Photographs of Lincoln taken by Alexander Gardner during Lincoln's second inauguration on the east front of the United States Capitol.
	March 4, 1865	Alexander Gardner	Washington, D.C.	photographic print: albumen silver. Negative smudged during development and Lincoln's face was destroyed.	Library of Congress	Photographs of Lincoln taken by Alexander Gardner during Lincoln's second inauguration on the east front of the United States Capitol.
	March 4, 1865	Alexander Gardner	Washington, D.C.	photographic print: albumen silver	Library of Congress	Photographs of Lincoln taken by Alexander Gardner during Lincoln's second inauguration on the east front of the United States Capitol.
	March 6, 1865	Henry F. Warren	Washington, D.C.		Library of Congress	This image in the Library of Congress has the printed notation on it of "The latest photograph of President Lincoln - taken on the balcony at the White House, March 6, 1865". The image was printed in Waltham, Massachusetts by photographer Henry Franklin Warren, who had a studio there.
	April 16, 1865	John B. Bachelder	Washington, D.C.	Carte-de-visite printed from a lost copy negative of a retouched original print		A photo taken of Abraham Lincoln's head lying in his casket.
	April 24, 1865	Benjamin Gurney	New York			A photo taken of Abraham Lincoln lying in his casket at New York City Hall.

See also Wikipedia article on Tad Lincoln for the famous 1864 photograph of Abraham Lincoln with his son Tad, by Anthony Berger.

== See also ==
- List of photographs of George Armstrong Custer
