= David Francis Barry =

American photographer

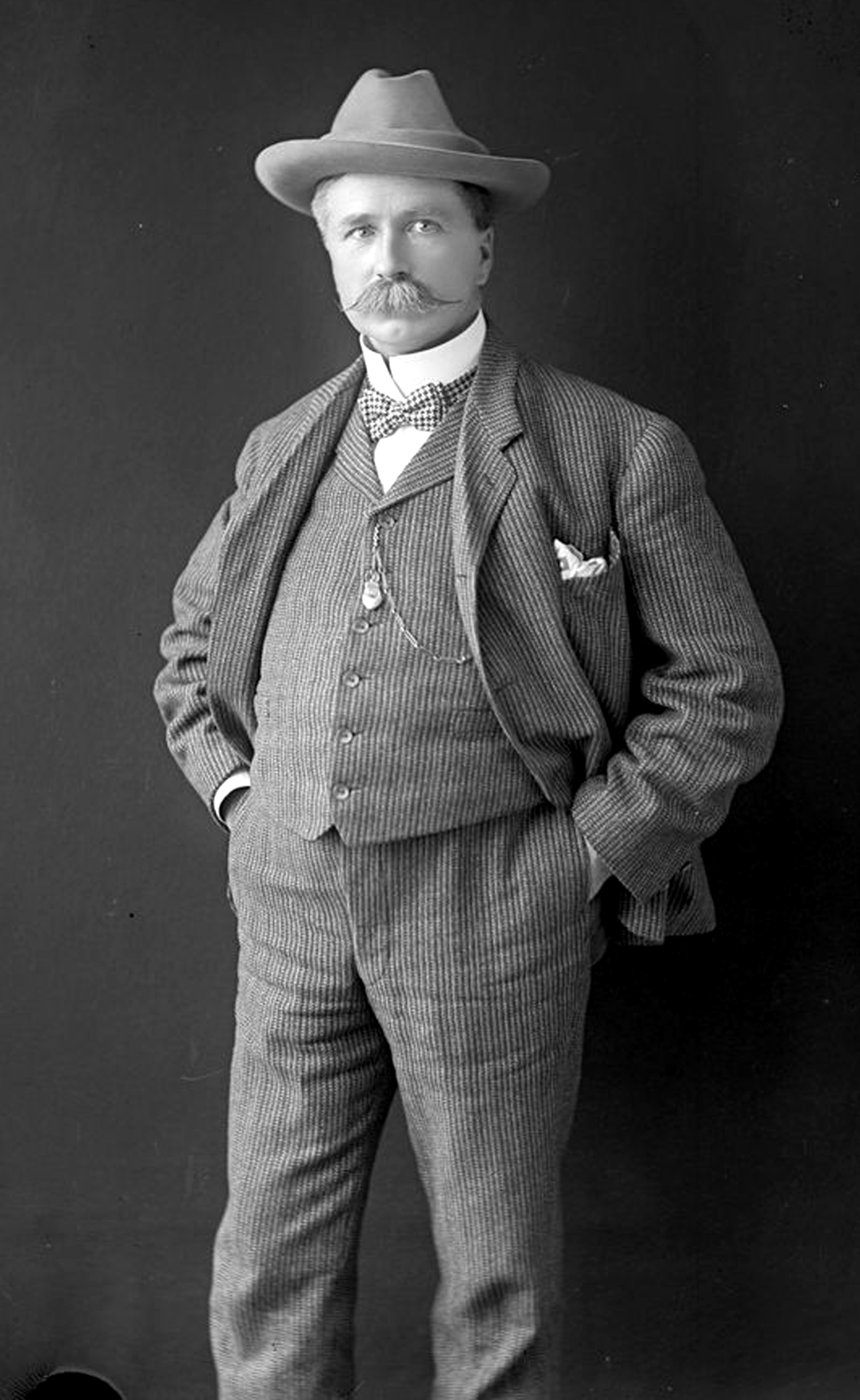
- David Francis Barry 1910
- Born: March 6, 1854; Honeoye Falls, New York, United States
- Died: March 6, 1934 (aged 80); Superior, Wisconsin, United States
- Occupation: photographer
- Spouse: Margaret "Patty" Young
- Writing career
- Notable works: portraits of Sitting Bull, Gall (Phizi), Rain-in-the-Face

David Francis Barry (March 6, 1854 – March 6, 1934) was a 19th-century photographer of the American West.

== Early life ==
Barry was born in Honeoye Falls, New York. In 1861, his family moved west to Otsego, Wisconsin and the following year to nearby Columbus. While growing up in Columbus, Wisconsin David F. Barry landed odd jobs assisting an itinerant photographer named Orlando Scott Goff who had maintained a small gallery in that city.

== Career ==
In 1871, Orlando Scott Goff moved to Yankton, Dakota Territory opening up the first photographer's studio in that settlement and two years later relocated to Bismarck. Goff sent for Barry to join him in 1878, his former young helper, taking him under his wings as an apprentice to assist him at his new Bismarck gallery. Over time their friendship grew to prompt Goff to make Barry his business partner. Between 1878 and 1883, utilizing a portable photographic studio, Barry traveled throughout the Plains, to Fort Buford and Fort Yates in the Dakotas and Fort Assiniboine in Montana taking photographs as he went. Having taken over Goff's business interests he eventually set up his own studio at Fort Yates and later in Bismarck. Barry made his name photographing Lakota people notables such as Sitting Bull, Rain-in-the-Face, Gall (Phizi), John Grass and others. The Lakota people nicknamed him "Little Shadow Catcher." Barry returned in 1890 to Wisconsin, where he operated a successful gallery in the city of Superior until his death in 1934.

== Personal life ==
Barry was married in Chicago on March 27, 1884, to Margaret "Patty" Young of Quincy, Illinois. The marriage remained childless. She died on August 20, 1932. The following year, in 1933 Barry sustained a serious leg injury while stepping off a street car in Duluth, Minnesota from which he never entirely recovered. He died on his 80th birthday at his Superior, Wisconsin home on March 6, 1934.

== Gallery ==
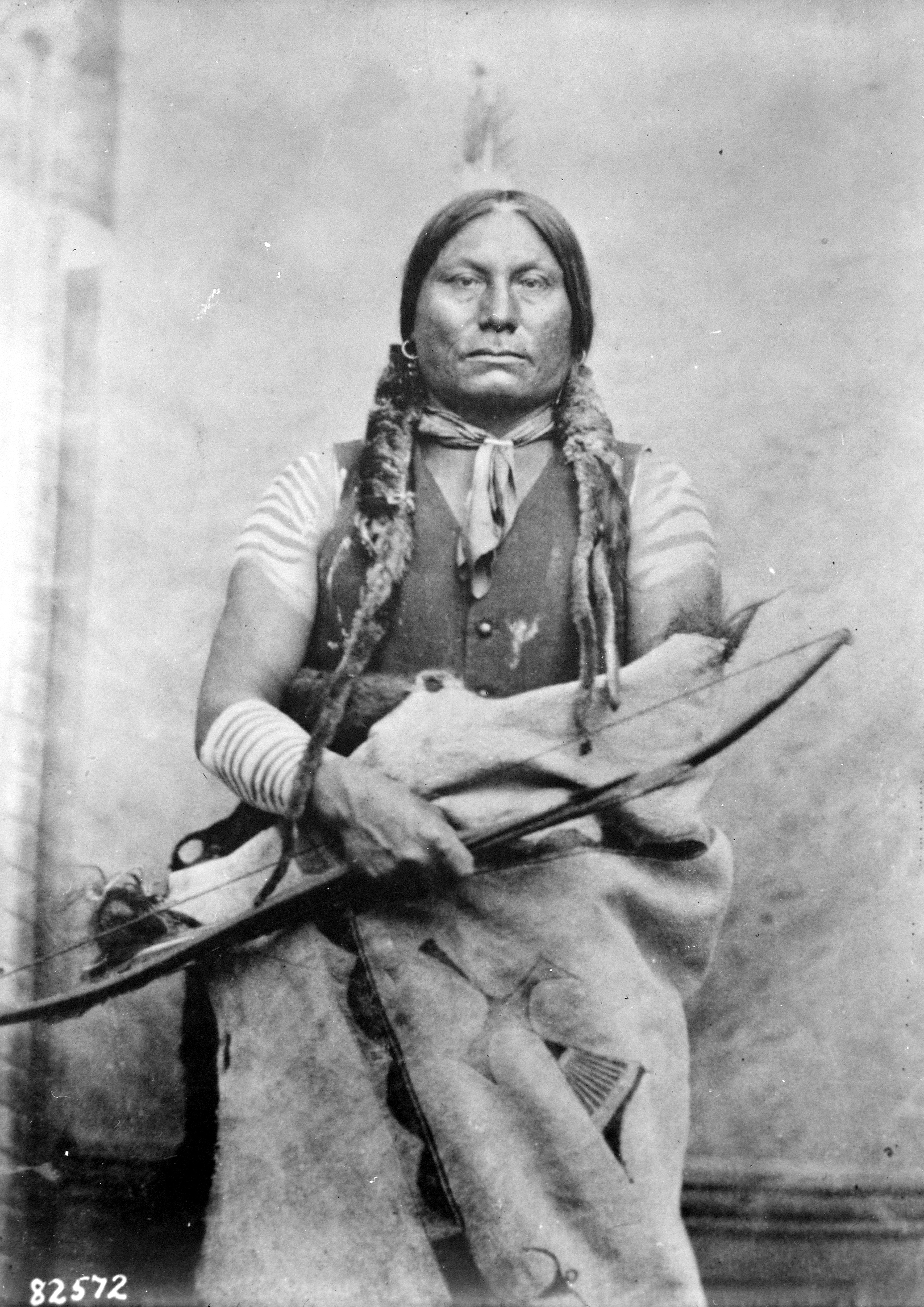
Chief Gall, 1881

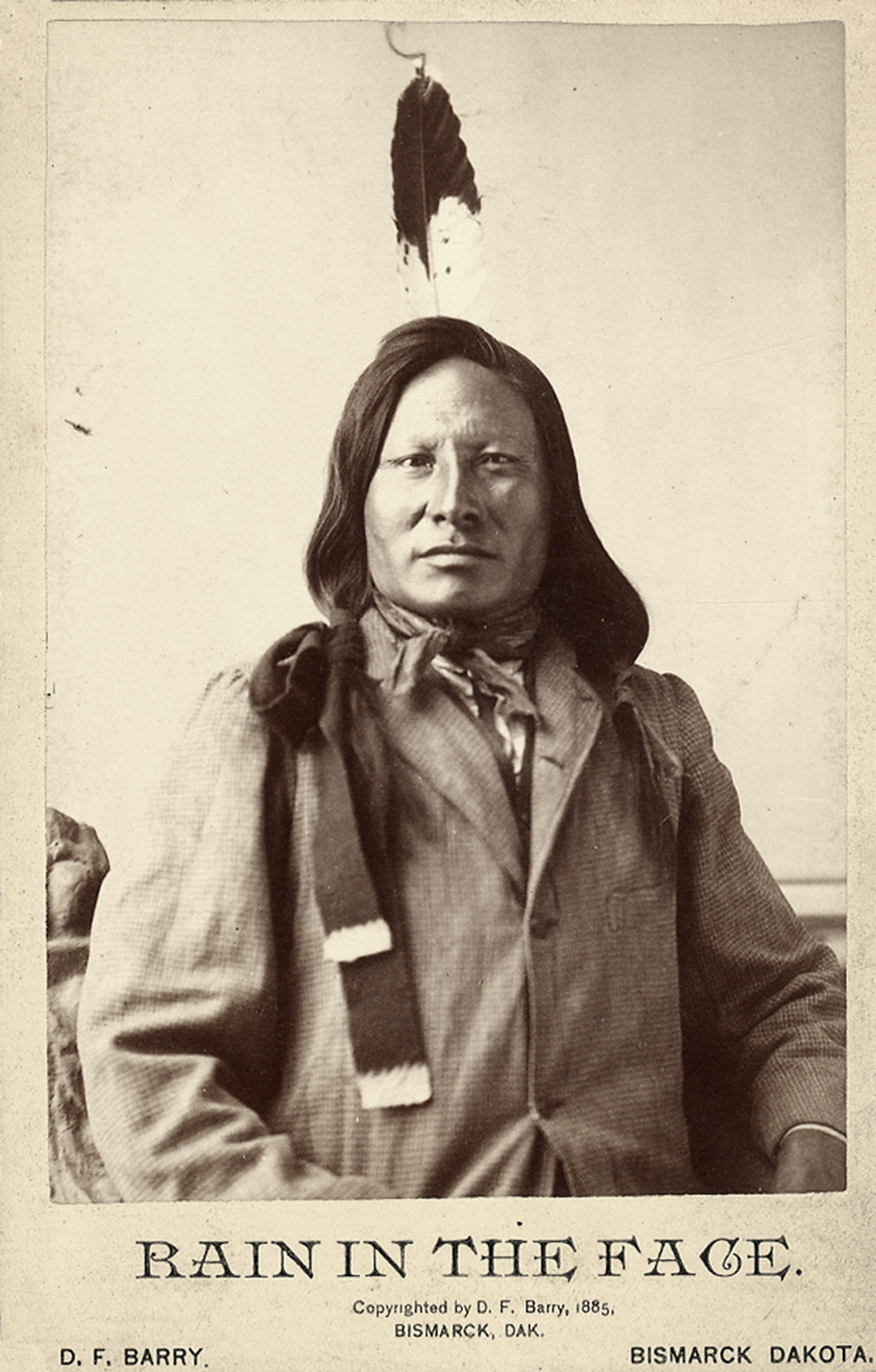
Rain-in-the-Face, 1885

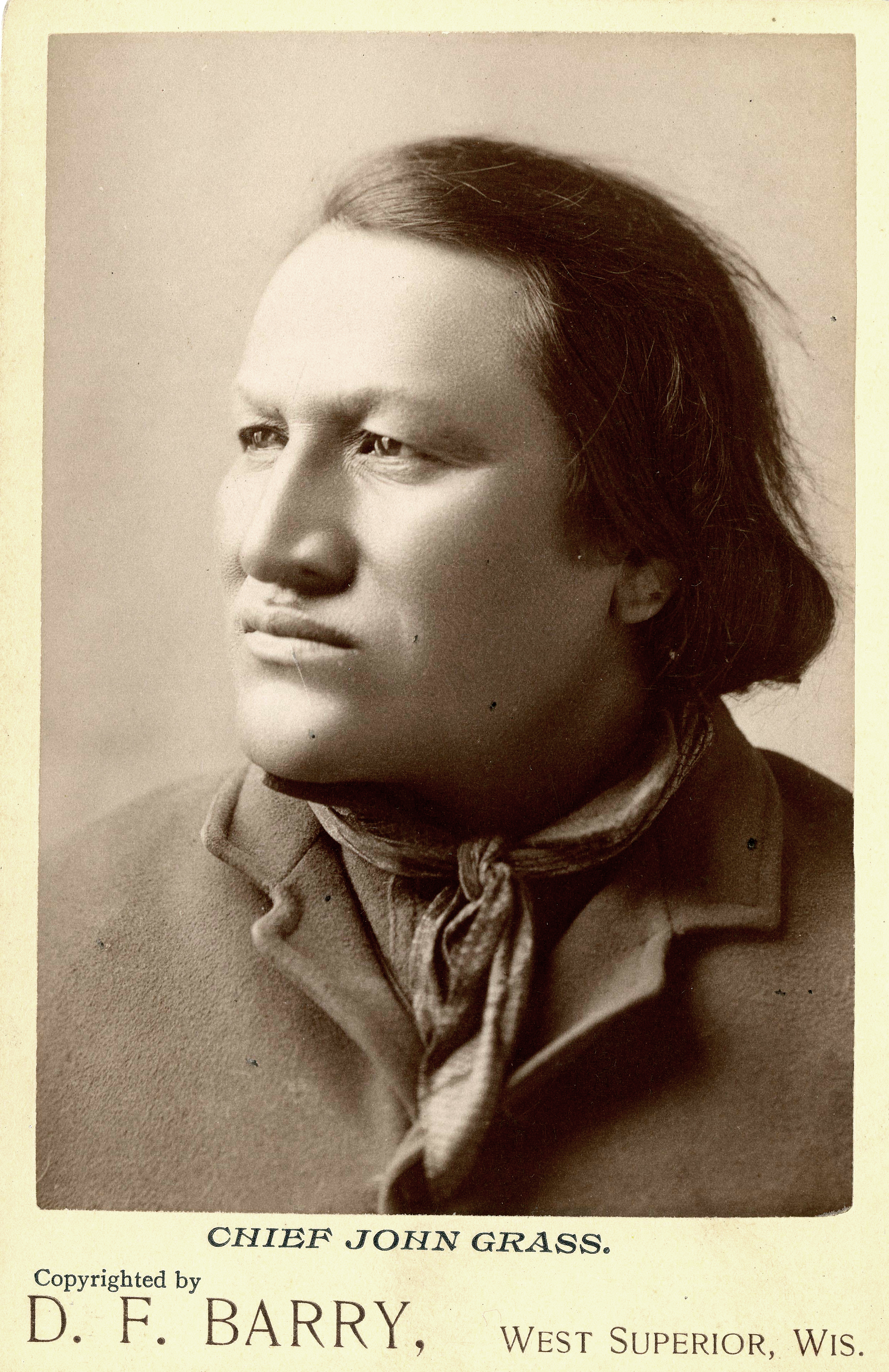
John Grass, 1885

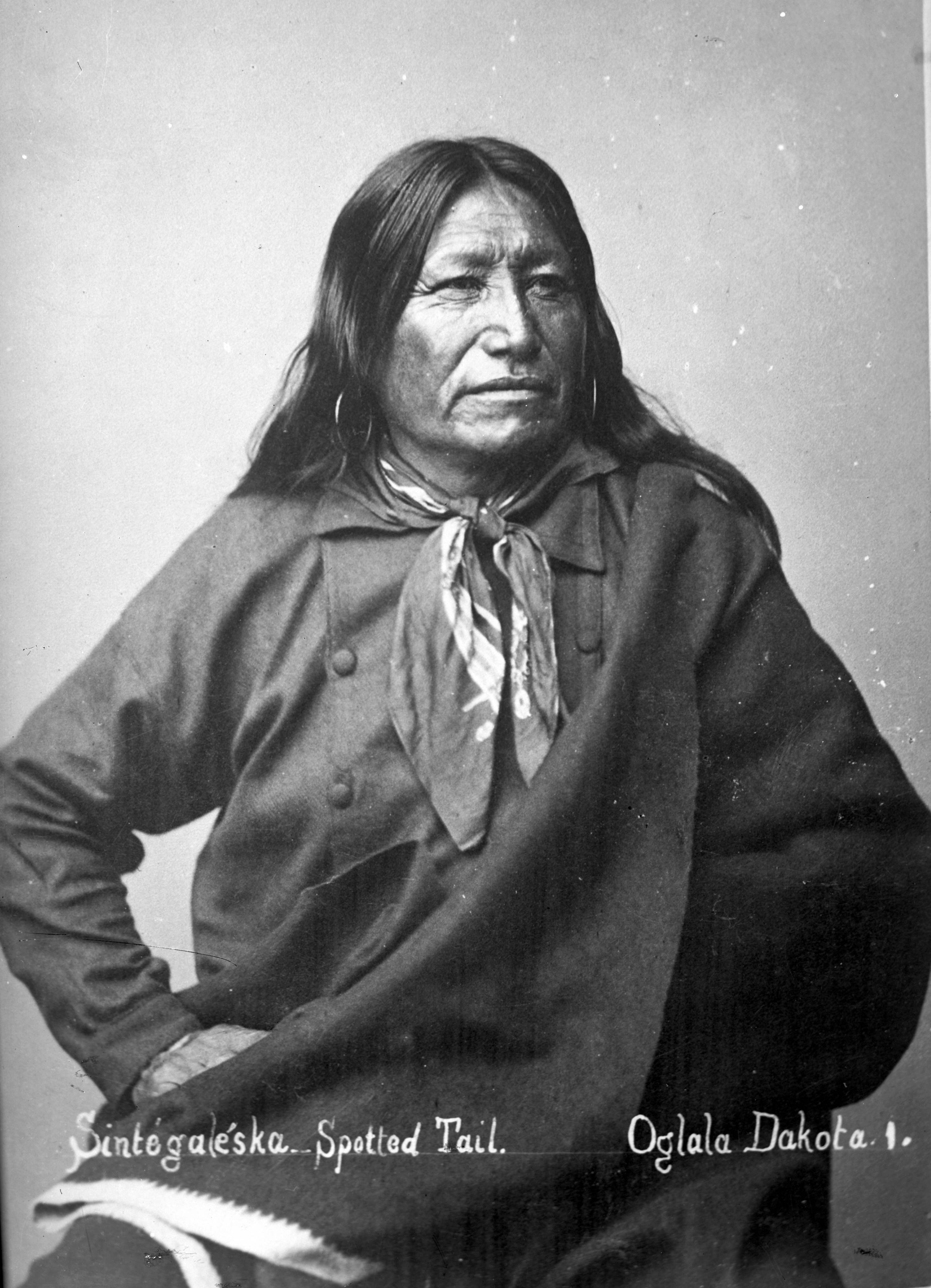
Spotted Tail
