= William Pywell =

American photographer

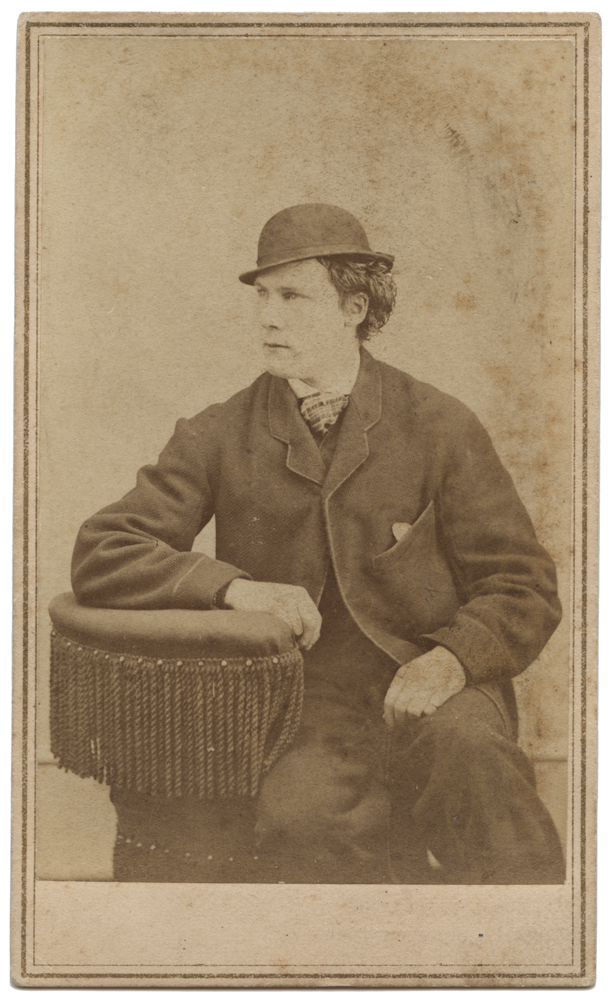
William Redish Pywell, ca 1857–1865.

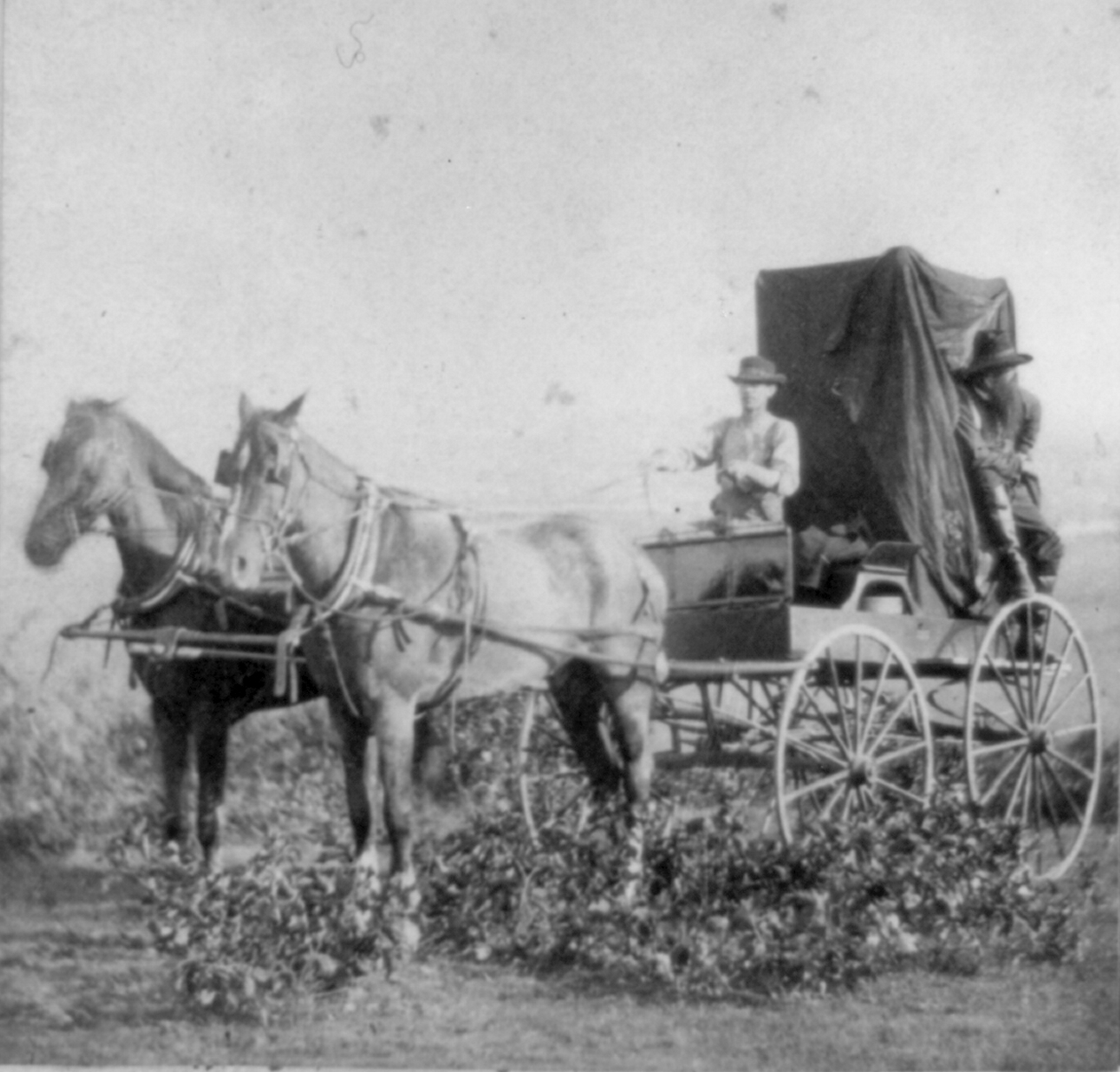
William Pywell on Expedition, Pywell is driving the wagon.

William Redish Pywell (June 9, 1843 – 1887) was a 19th-century American photographer. He first worked for Mathew Brady and Alexander Gardner making a photographic record of the American Civil War, this work was published by Gardner in 1866 as "Photographic Sketch Book of the War" Vols. 1 & 2. (Washington, DC. Philp & Solomons). After the war, he traveled with George Custer as the official photographer of the 1873 Yellowstone Expedition. He also accompanied Alexander Gardner on the Kansas Expedition.
