= William F. Browne =

American soldier and photographer

William Frank Browne
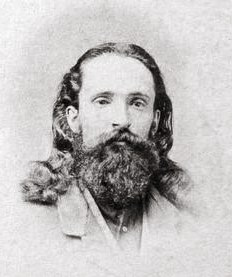
- 1863 Self-Portrait
- Born: Northfield, Vermont, U.S.
- Died: September 12, 1867; Northfield, Vermont, U.S.
- Military career
- Allegiance: Union Army
- Branch: United States Army
- Service years: 1861–1863
- Rank: Private
- Unit: 15th Vermont Infantry
- Conflicts: American Civil War
- Other work: Photographer

William Frank Browne (died September 12, 1867) was an American military photographer noted for his prolific work during the Civil War.

== Biography ==
Browne was born in Northfield, Vermont. When the Civil War erupted in 1861, he enlisted as a private in Company C of the 15th Vermont Infantry at Berlin, Vermont. He mustered out of the Union Army in August 1863. Soon afterward, he began working as the camp photographer of the 5th Michigan Cavalry, staying with them in their winter encampment at Stevensburg, Virginia. He took some of the earliest portrait photographs of George Armstrong Custer, commander of the Michigan Brigade, after that officer's promotion to Brigadier General.

In 1864 Browne was employed by Alexander Gardner. In early 1865, he was assigned to photograph the fighting around Richmond, Virginia. A collection of 120 photographs taken by Browne were published by Gardner under the title, View of Confederate Water Batteries on James River.

After the war, Browne returned to his native Northfield, where he died of consumption in 1867.

A number of his original photographs and prints are in the collection of the Library of Congress.
