= Orlando Scott Goff =

American photographer (1843–1916)

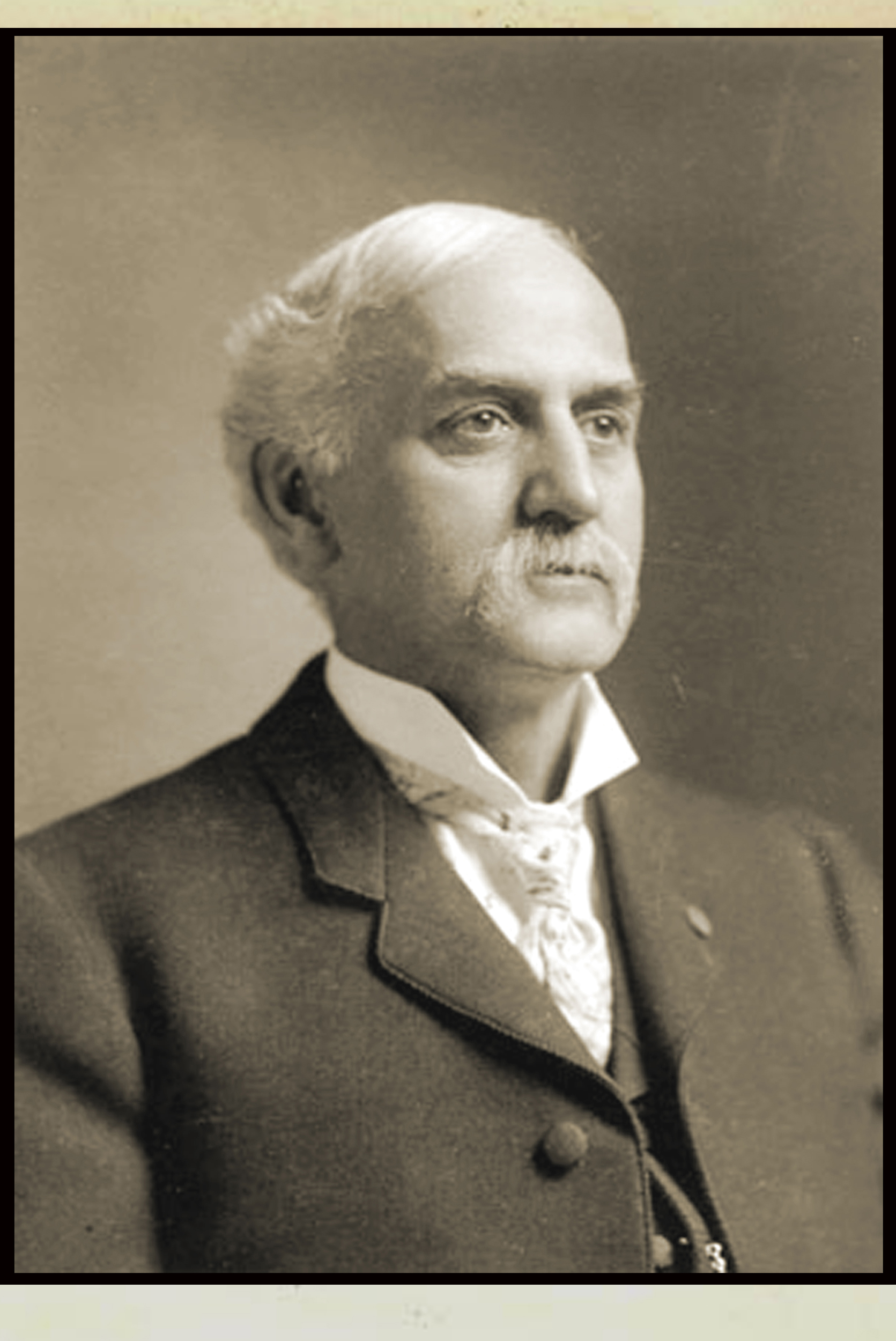
- Orlando Scott Goff in 1907
- Born: 10 September 1843; Middletown, Connecticut, United States
- Died: 17 October 1916 (aged 73); Boise, Idaho, United States
- Occupation: photographer
- Spouse: Annie Eaton
- Children: Bessie Goff Oldson
- Writing career
- Genres: Indian Wars, Sioux, early Reservation Period, Western Americana
- Notable works: first portraits of Sitting Bull, Chief Joseph

Orlando Scott Goff (September 10, 1843 – October 17, 1916) was a 19th-century photographer of the American West.

== Early life ==
Orlando Scott Goff was born in Middletown, Connecticut on September 10, 1843, the youngest of five children of Alfred Goff, shoemaker and Adaline, née Giddings. In his late teens Goff was apprenticed to learn the trade of carriage maker, but after the outbreak of the American Civil War he enlisted in October 1861 at the age of 18 with the 10th Connecticut Regiment Infantry of the Union Army seeing service in the Carolinas, Florida and Virginia. On October 13, 1864 Goff was wounded at the Battle of Darbytown Road near Richmond, Virginia. He spent two months at a military hospital at Fort Monroe, Virginia and upon his release, he was promoted to 1st sergeant and later to 2nd lieutenant. On August 2, 1865 Goff was mustered out of service.

== Career ==
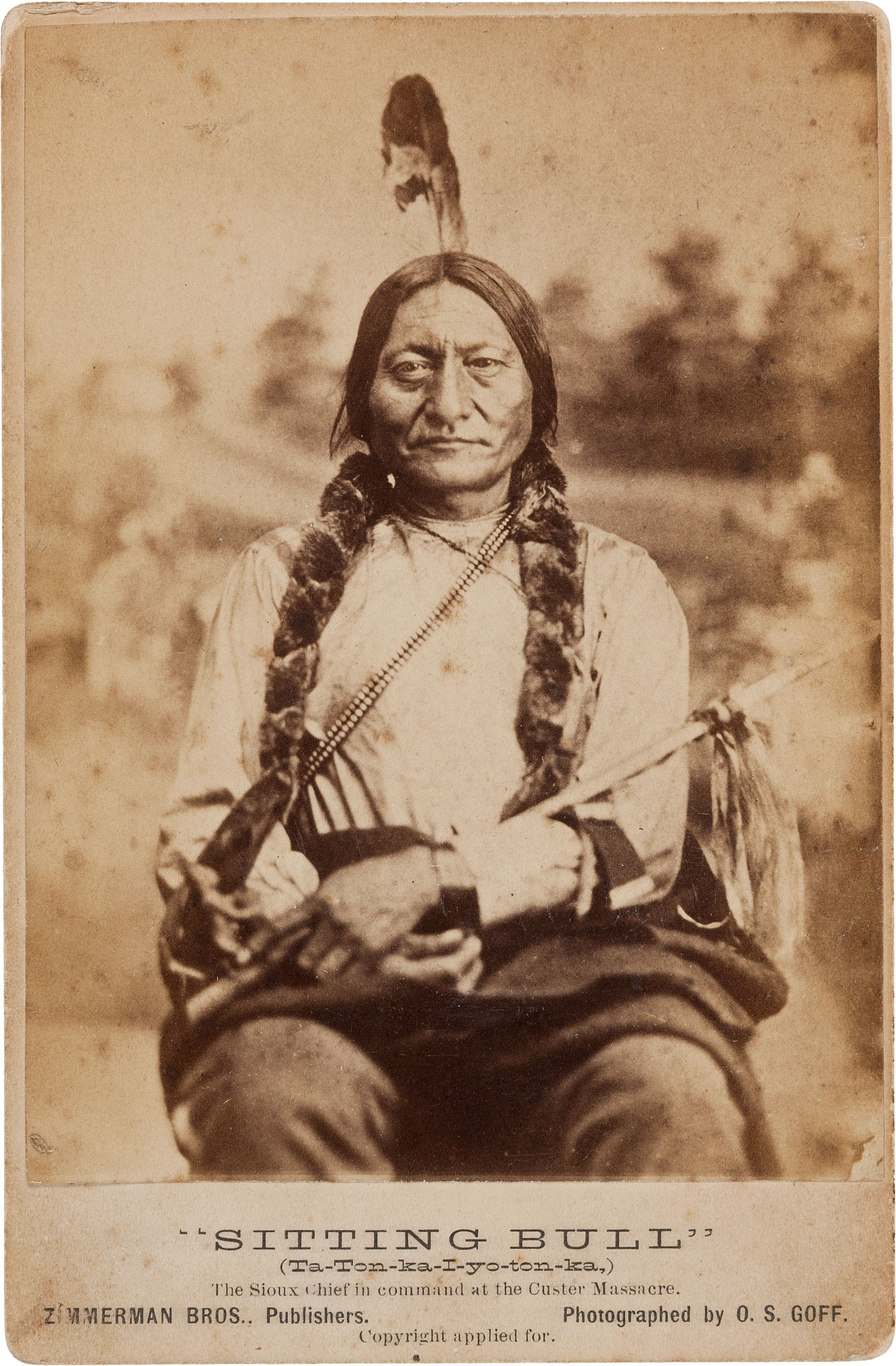
Sitting Bull by Orlando Scott Goff, July 31, 1881 Bismarck, Dakota Territory

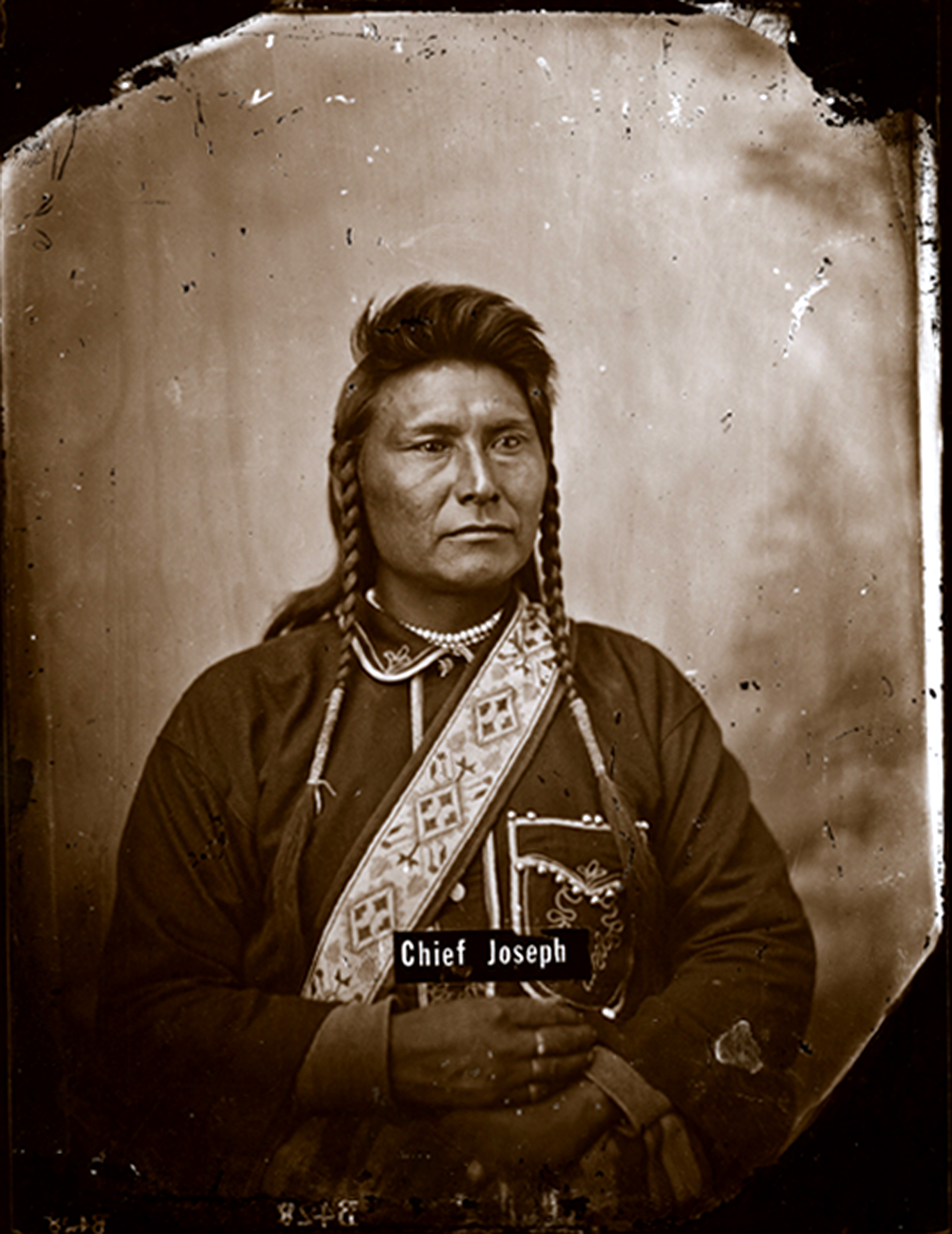
Chief Joseph by Orlando Scott Goff, 1877 Bismarck, Dakota Territory

He first returned to his native Connecticut but half a year later he relocated to Lyons, New York where he would remain for the next two and a half years. It was there where he learned the trade of photography. By 1868 he had moved to Portage, Wisconsin where he practiced his trade of photography, also operating a small gallery in nearby Columbus. While in the latter place he met and engaged as an apprentice his future business partner, David Francis Barry. In 1871 he moved to Yankton in Dakota Territory and in 1873 to Bismarck where he established a photographic studio and gallery. In 1875 he accepted the position of post photographer at Fort Abraham Lincoln while Lt. Colonel George Armstrong Custer and several units of the 7th Cavalry Regiment were stationed there. Goff took the last pictures of Custer and his officers and men prior to their engagement at the Battle of the Little Bighorn against Sitting Bull’s allied Sioux, Cheyenne and Arapaho. Goff returned to Bismarck to attend to his studio. In 1877 he took the first photograph of Chief Joseph of the Nez Perce people and on July 31, 1881 a photograph of Sitting Bull of the Hunkpapa band of the Lakota people. He often embarked on travels outside of his studio, capturing images across the Plains and of Native Americans.

== Later life ==
By the mid-1880s Goff sold his business interests to his friend and partner David Francis Barry and eventually moved to Montana. He served one term with the Montana Legislature in 1907-1908 and soon thereafter moved to live with his daughter in Idaho. Orlando Scott Goff died in Boise, Idaho on October 17, 1916.

== Family ==
Goff was married in 1875 to Annie Eaton who was originally from New York. The couple had one child, a daughter, Bessie, who was born at Bismarck on September 22, 1878.
