= José María Mora =

Cuban-American photographer

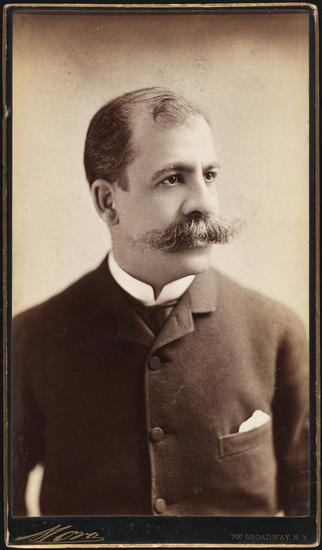
- Self-Portrait, c. 1885
- Born: September 2, 1847; Havana, Cuba
- Died: October 18, 1926 (aged 79); New York City, US
- Resting place: Woodlawn Cemetery The Bronx, New York
- Occupation: Photographer
- Years active: 1868–1895

José María Mora (September 2, 1847 – October 18, 1926) was a Cuban-American portrait photographer active in New York City during the 1870s and 1880s.

== Early life and education ==
The son of wealthy Cuban landowners, Mora was living in Paris and training as a painter in 1868 when the start of the Ten Years' War forced his family to flee their home in Havana and resettle in New York City.

== Career ==
Unable to continue his study of painting once he joined his family in New York, Mora found employment with celebrity photographer Napoleon Sarony who trained him in the photographic portrait business and the art of painted retouching—an early form of photo-manipulation. After two years with Sarony, Mora founded his own portrait studio and went on to become a friendly rival to his former mentor and contemporary stage photographers such as Benjamin J. Falk.

Mora specialized in producing cabinet card portrait photographs of Gilded Age celebrities, including actors, opera performers, writers, and prominent members of New York City Society. He was the portraitist of choice for the New York Metropolitan Opera and Manhattan's high-society costume balls during the 1870s and 1880s, and his photographs of comic actors, burlesque dancers, and clowns regularly appeared in the pages of illustrated newspapers such as the National Police Gazette. What set Mora's work apart from competing photographers was his use of large-scale painted backdrops that made his subjects appear to be transported to exotic or fantastical locations.

== Death ==
Mora died at the Breslin Hotel in Manhattan in 1926 and was buried in Woodlawn Cemetery, Bronx New York.
