= Richard Howe, Earl Howe =

Royal Navy officer and politician (1726–1799)

Admiral of the Fleet The Right Honourable The Earl Howe KG
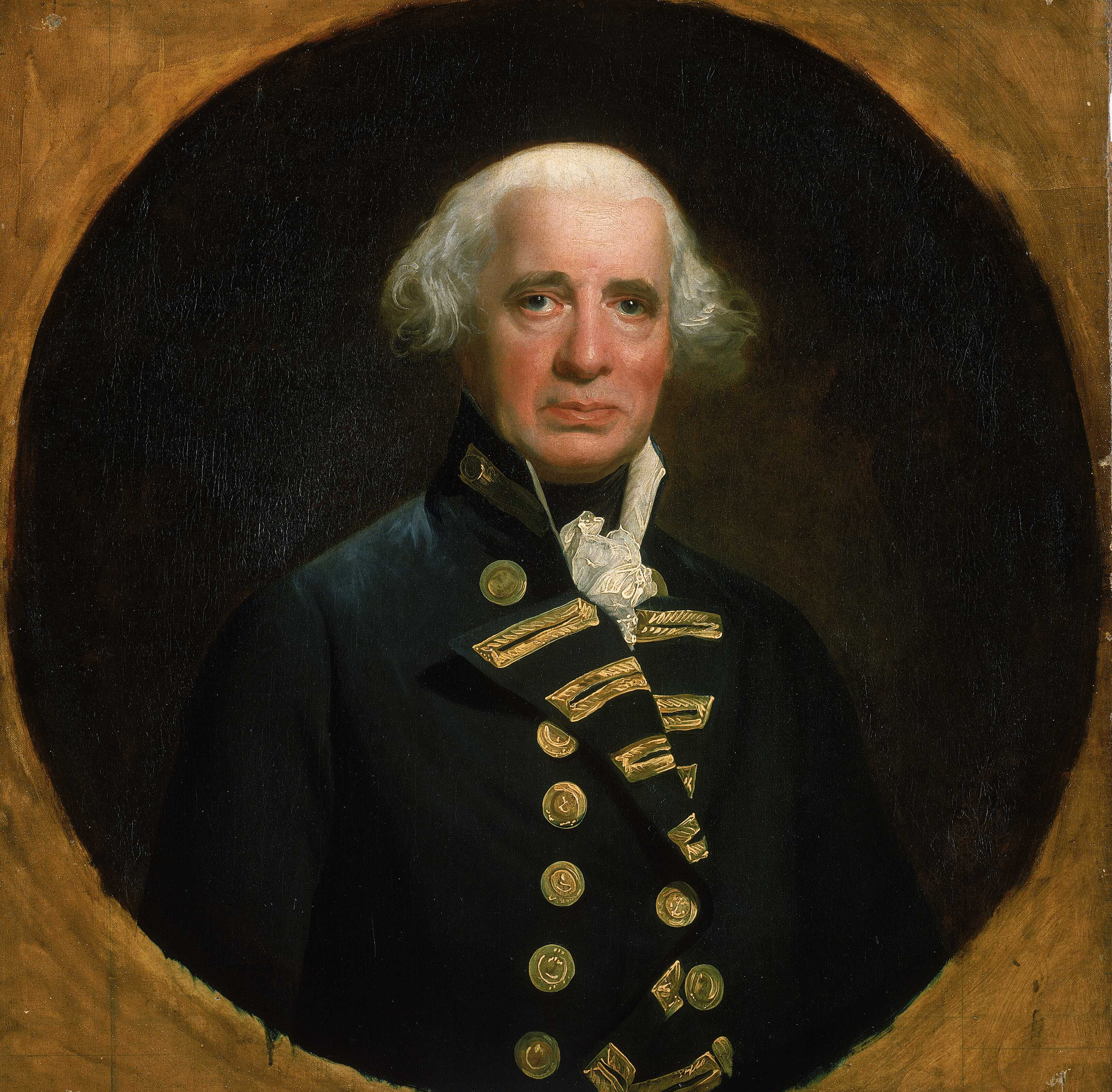
- Portrait by John Singleton Copley, 1794
- Born: 8 March 1726; London, England
- Died: 5 August 1799 (aged 73); London, England
- Burial place: St Andrew's Church, Langar, Nottinghamshire
- Spouse: Mary Hartop (m. 1758)
- Children: 3, including Sophia
- Military career
- Allegiance: Great Britain
- Branch: Royal Navy
- Service years: 1740–1799
- Rank: Admiral of the Fleet
- Commands: HMS Baltimore; HMS Triton; HMS Rippon; HMS Cornwall; HMS Glory; HMS Dolphin; HMS Dunkirk; HMS Magnanime; HMS Princess Amelia; Mediterranean Fleet; North American Station; Channel Fleet
- Conflicts: War of the Austrian Succession; Jacobite rising of 1745; Seven Years' War; American Revolutionary War; French Revolutionary Wars
- Awards: Knight of the Order of the Garter; Large Naval Gold Medal

Admiral of the Fleet Richard Howe, Earl Howe (8 March 1726 – 5 August 1799) was a Royal Navy officer and politician. After serving in the War of the Austrian Succession, he gained a reputation for his role in amphibious operations against the French coast as part of Britain's policy of naval descents during the Seven Years' War. He also took part, as a naval captain, in the decisive British naval victory at the Battle of Quiberon Bay in November 1759.

In North America, Howe is best known for his service during the American War of Independence, when he acted as a naval commander and a peace commissioner with the American rebels; he also conducted a successful relief during the Great Siege of Gibraltar in the later stages of the War. Howe later commanded the victorious British fleet during the Glorious First of June in June 1794 during the French Revolutionary Wars.

== Early career ==
Howe was born in Albemarle Street, London, the second son of Emanuel Howe, 2nd Viscount Howe, who died as governor of Barbados in March 1735, and of Charlotte, a daughter of Baroness von Kielmansegg, afterwards Countess of Darlington, the half-sister of King George I.

After education at Eton College, Richard Howe entered the navy in the fifth-rate HMS Pearl in July 1739. He then transferred to the fourth-rate HMS Severn, one of the squadron sent into the south seas with Admiral George Anson in 1740. Severn sailed to Cape Horn and then, after encountering storms, returned home in Spring 1742. Howe next served in the West Indies aboard the third-rate HMS Burford and was present when she was severely damaged in the unsuccessful attack on La Guaira in February 1743 during the War of the Austrian Succession. He transferred to the third-rate HMS Suffolk, flagship of Admiral Sir Charles Knowles, Commander-in-Chief in the West Indies, in March 1743 and then to the fifth-rate HMS Eltham in July 1743, before being promoted to midshipman on 8 October 1743 and returning to HMS Suffolk later that month. Promoted to lieutenant on 25 May 1744, he joined the bomb vessel HMS Comet and then transferred to the first-rate HMS Royal George, flagship of Admiral Edward Vernon, in August 1745.

Promoted to commander on 5 November 1745, Howe was commanding officer of the sloop HMS Baltimore in the North Sea during the Jacobite rising of 1745 and was severely wounded in the head while cooperating with a frigate in an engagement with two French privateers. Promoted to post-captain on 10 April 1746, he was given command of the sixth-rate HMS Triton and took part in convoy duties off Lisbon. He transferred to the command of the fourth-rate HMS Rippon in Summer 1747 and sailed to the West Indies before becoming Flag Captain to Admiral Sir Charles Knowles, Commander-in-Chief, Jamaica, in the third-rate HMS Cornwall in October 1748. He was given command of the fifth-rate HMS Glory off the coast of West Africa in March 1751 and then transferred to the command of the sixth-rate HMS Dolphin in the Mediterranean Fleet in June 1752.

== Seven Years' War ==
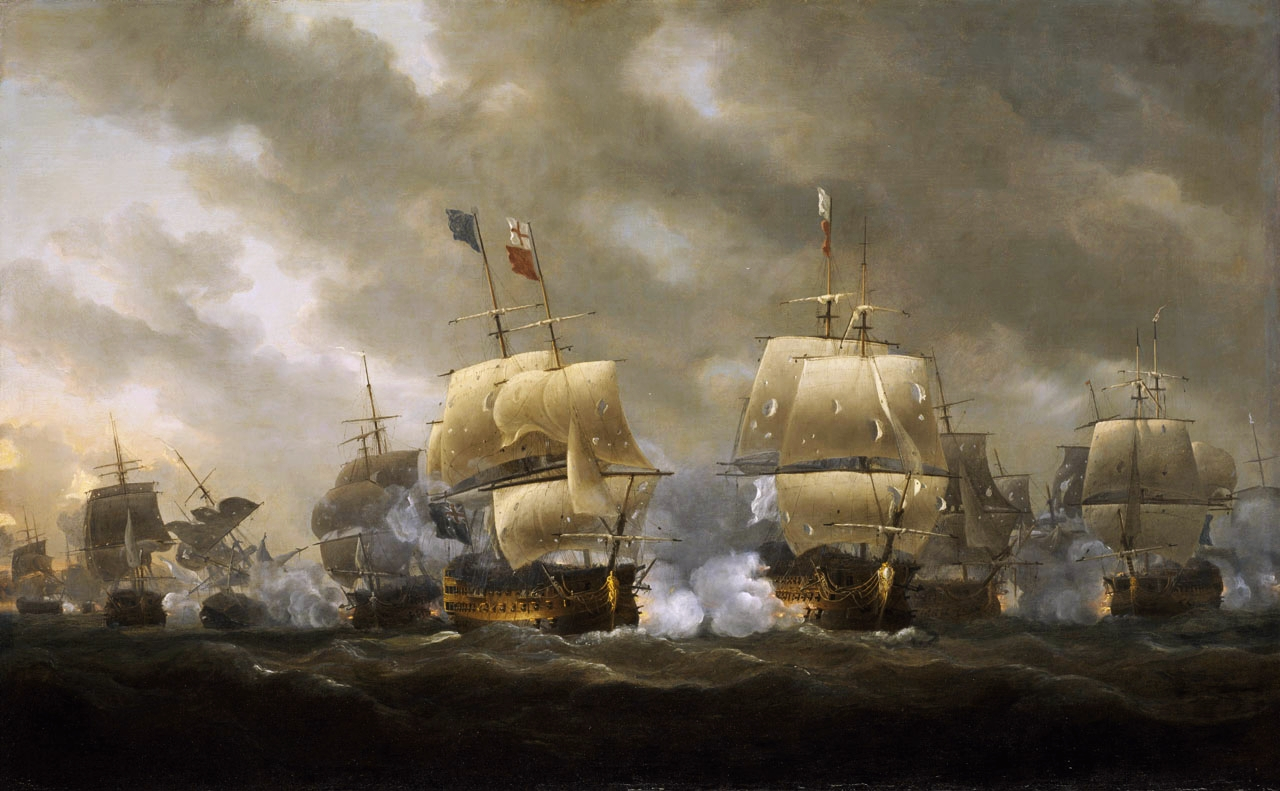
The Battle of Quiberon Bay by Nicholas Pocock. Howe took part in the battle as a captain. The overwhelming British victory at Quiberon Bay ended the prospect of a French Invasion of Britain or Ireland.

In January 1755, Howe was given command of the fourth-rate HMS Dunkirk and was sent to North America as part of a squadron commanded by Admiral Edward Boscawen: his capture of the French Alcide was the first shot fired in the Seven Years' War. He was elected member of parliament for Dartmouth in May 1757 and became commanding officer of the third-rate HMS Magnanime in the Channel in July 1757. From then until the peace of 1763, he served in the Channel in various more or less futile expeditions against the French coast, gaining a reputation as a firm and skillful officer for his role in the series of naval descents on the French coast including the Raid on Rochefort in September 1757. Promoted to commodore, with his broad pennant in the third-rate HMS Essex, he took part in the Raid on St Malo in June 1758, the Raid on Cherbourg in August 1758 and the Battle of Saint Cast in September 1758. He was particularly noted for his conduct at Rochefort, where he had taken the Île-d'Aix, and was described by George Rodney as performing his duties "with such cool and steady resolution, as has most justly gained him the universal applause of army and navy".

After the death of his elder brother, killed near Ticonderoga on 6 July 1758, Howe became Viscount Howe in the Peerage of Ireland. On 20 November 1759, he led Admiral Edward Hawke's fleet at the Battle of Quiberon Bay where the British won a decisive victory, forestalling a planned French invasion of Britain. He became Flag Captain to Rear-Admiral the Duke of York in the third-rate HMS Princess Amelia in June 1762.

Howe was appointed to the Board of Admiralty led by John Montagu, 4th Earl of Sandwich as Senior Naval Lord in April 1763. He became Treasurer of the Navy in 1765 and, having been promoted to rear admiral on 18 October 1770, went on to be Commander-in-Chief, Mediterranean Fleet in November 1770. Promoted to Vice-Admiral of the Blue on 5 February 1776, he became Commander-in-Chief, North American Station later that month.

== American War of Independence ==
At the beginning of the American War of Independence, Howe was known to be sympathetic to the colonists. He had known Benjamin Franklin since late 1774 and was joined in a commission with his brother, General Sir William Howe, head of the land forces, to attempt a reconciliation.

=== Blockade ===
Howe was ordered to institute a naval blockade of the American coastline, but this proved to be ineffective. Howe claimed to have too few ships to successfully accomplish this, particularly as a number had to be detached to support operations by the British Army. As a result, large amounts of covert French supplies and munitions were smuggled to America. It has been suggested that Howe's limited blockade at this point was driven by his sympathy with and desire for conciliation with the Americans. By 1778 the blockade was looking more promising, with many merchant ships being taken. Howe complained to London that while his ships were able to successfully guard the southern colonies, the blockade of the northern colonies was still ineffective.

=== New York and Philadelphia ===
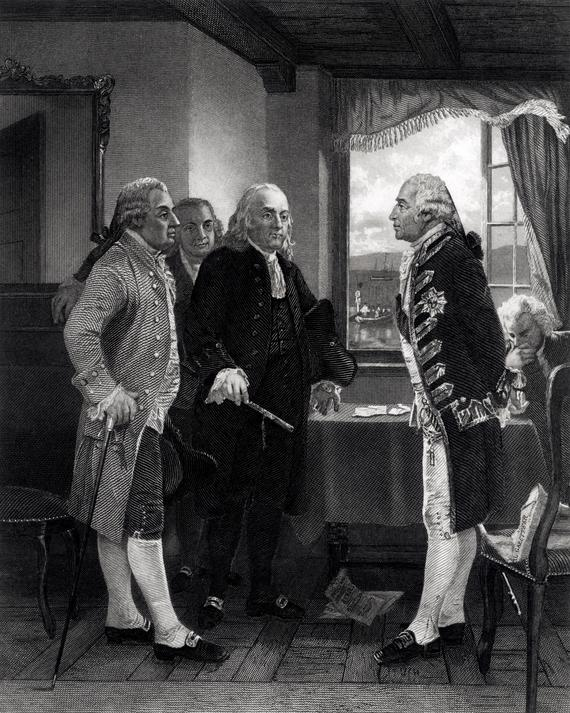
Howe (second from right) at the Staten Island Peace Conference

The strategy of the British in North America was to deploy a combination of operations aimed at capturing major cities and a blockade of the coast. The British took Long Island in August 1776 and captured New York City in September 1776 in combined operations involving the army and the navy during the New York and New Jersey campaign. He represented the Crown at the Staten Island Peace Conference held on 11 September 1776. In 1777 Howe provided support to his brother's operation to capture Philadelphia, ferrying General Howe's army to a landing point from which they successfully marched and took the city. Howe spent much of the remainder of the year concentrating on capturing Forts Mifflin and Mercer which controlled entry to the Delaware River without which ships could not reach Philadelphia. News of the capture of a separate British army under General John Burgoyne threw British plans into disarray. Howe spent the winter in Newport, Rhode Island.

=== Return to England ===
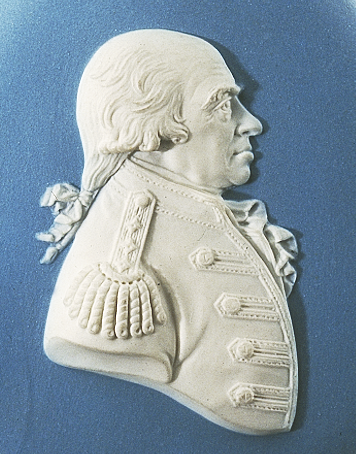
Detail of a Wedgwood jasperware portrait medallion of Howe, a sign of his celebrity

In Summer 1778 a French squadron commanded by the Comte d'Estaing was sent to America. Howe's fleet was delayed departing New York by contrary winds, and he arrived off Point Judith on 9 August. Since d'Estaing's fleet outnumbered Howe's, the French admiral, fearful that Howe would be further reinforced and eventually gain a numerical advantage, reboarded the French troops, and sailed out to do battle with Howe on 10 August. As the two fleets prepared to battle and manoeuvred for position, the weather deteriorated, and a major storm broke out. Raging for two days, the storm scattered both fleets, severely damaging the French flagship. As the two fleets sought to regroup, individual ships encountered enemy ships, and there were several minor naval skirmishes; two French ships (including d'Estaing's flagship), already suffering storm damage, were badly mauled in these encounters. The French fleet regrouped off Delaware, and returned to Newport on 20 August, while the British fleet regrouped at New York.

Three of Howe's ships, the sixth-rate HMS Sphinx, the converted merchantman HMS Vigilant and the row galley HMS Spitfire Galley, bombarded American troops during the Battle of Rhode Island on 29 August. Howe then chased the remaining ships of the French fleet to Boston in Massachusetts where they made repairs. With no prospect of the French fleet coming out of port, Howe left his station in September 1778.

Declining to serve afterwards, Howe cited distrust of Lord North and a lack of support during his command in America. He was further embittered by the replacement of himself and his brother as peace commissioners, as well as by attacks in the press against him by ministerial writers including the prominent Loyalist Joseph Galloway. An inquiry in Parliament demanded by the Howe brothers to justify their conduct in America was held during 1779 but ended inconclusively. Howe spent much of the next three years with the opposition attacking the government's alleged mismanagement of the war at sea. The only exception was his support of a motion of thanks to Admiral George Rodney for his victory against the Spanish during the Moonlight Battle.

As Howe had joined the opposition in Parliament to North's government, it was clear that until it was replaced he would be unable to secure a fresh naval command. Despite the setback at Saratoga, and the entry of France, Spain and the Dutch Republic into the war, North's government continued to gain strength until October 1781 when a British army under Lord Cornwallis was forced to surrender to a combined Franco-American force at Yorktown. Although the government was able to continue for several more months its effective power had been sapped. In March 1782 the House of Commons passed a motion ending offensive actions against the American rebels, although the war around the rest of the globe continued with the same intensity. North's government then fell and was replaced by a weak coalition of Whigs led by the Marquess of Rockingham.

=== Command of the Channel Fleet ===
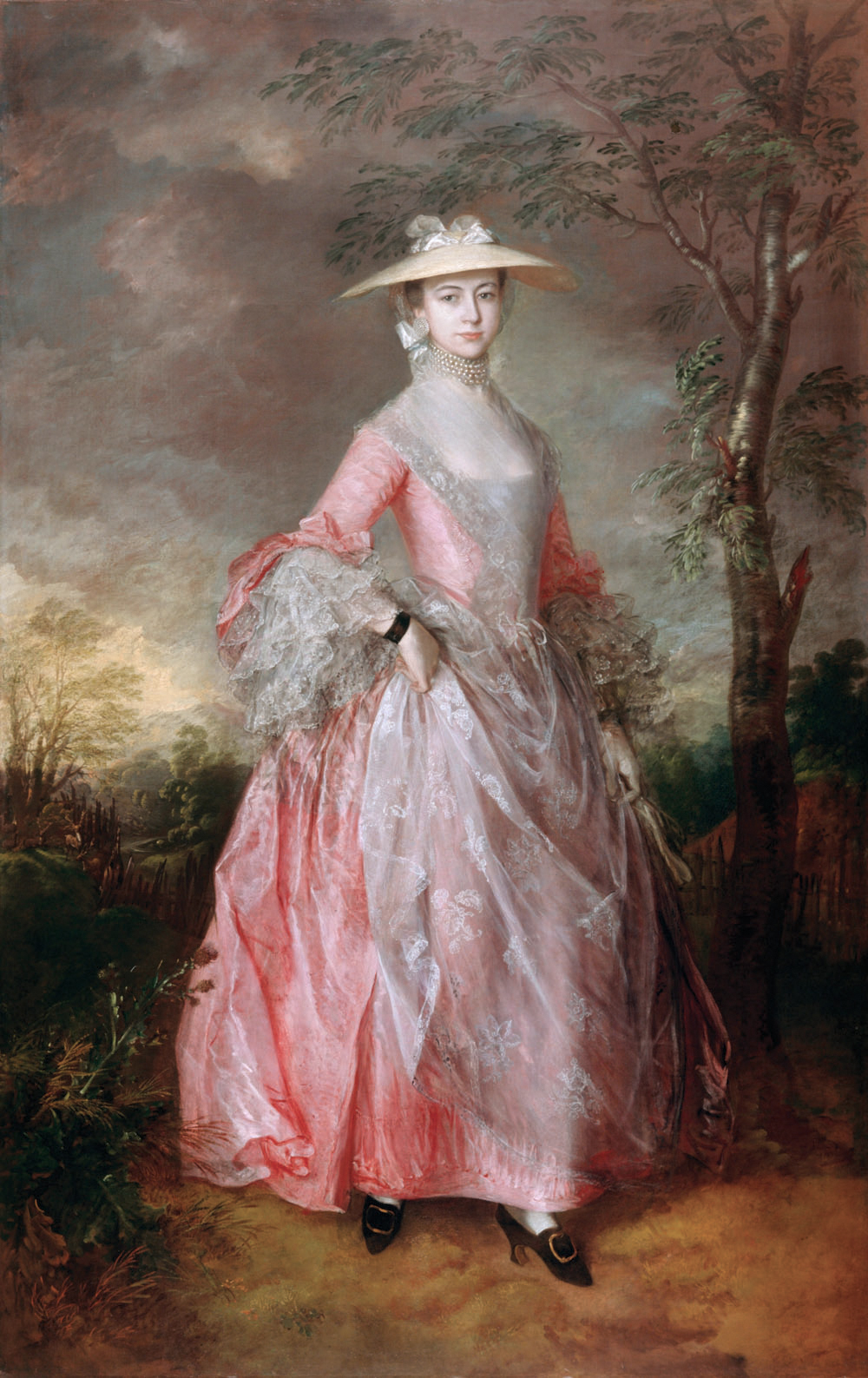
Portrait of Countess Howe by Thomas Gainsborough, 1764

Not until the fall of Lord North's government in March 1782 did Howe once again accept a command. Despite the suspension of hostilities in America, the war in Europe continued with the same force and the Royal Navy was severely stretched in having to deal with the French, Spanish and Dutch fleets. Howe received instructions from Augustus Keppel, the new First Lord of the Admiralty, to proceed to Portsmouth and take command of the Channel Fleet, which he did in April 1782. Promoted to Admiral of the Blue on 8 April 1782, he was created Viscount Howe in the Peerage of Great Britain on 20 April 1782.

Howe's task was complex. He had to protect inbound trade convoys from the Americas, as well as keep track of the Franco-Spanish fleet, while also keeping an eye on the Dutch fleet at port in the Texel, which was reportedly ready to sail. He also had to keep in mind the need to attempt a relief of Gibraltar, which had been under siege for several years and would be forced to surrender if it wasn't resupplied soon. Howe had to accomplish these tasks with significantly fewer ships than his combined opponents. Keppel observed the Royal Navy's best hope was to quickly shift their limited forces from one area of danger to another.

In May Howe took a number of ships to the Dutch coast to scout out Dutch preparations. If the Dutch made a sortie into the North Sea they would be able to threaten Britain's vital Baltic convoys, including precious naval stores which were needed for continuing the war. This in turn might lead the Dutch to launch attacks on the East coast of England. As the Dutch fleet appeared unlikely to put to sea immediately, Howe returned to Britain, leaving a squadron of nine ships to keep a watch on the Texel. The French and Spanish fleets had sailed from Brest and Cádiz and combined in the Western Approaches, where they managed to capture some merchant ships. Howe put to sea to try and monitor them, and received information that a major trade convoy was incoming from the West Indies.

Howe had only 25 ships-of-the-line against 36 enemy ships under Admiral Córdoba, which separated him from the convoy he was ordered to protect. He sent a message for the convoy to put into safety in ports in Ireland. Howe then took his fleet by a dangerous route around the north side of the Isles of Scilly. This allowed him to get between the inbound convoy and the Franco-Spanish fleet as well as allowing him to gain the weather gauge which would be a major advantage in any battle. The next morning the Franco-Spanish fleet had disappeared. After waiting a while Howe decided to go in pursuit of them, later receiving news that the West Indian convoy had safely reached harbour in the English Channel. The Franco-Spanish fleet had been blown southwards by a strong gale, and then received orders in early August to return home.

=== Relief of Gibraltar ===
Relief of Gibraltar by Earl Howe, 11 October 1782, by Richard Paton. Howe, flying his flag aboard the 100-gun HMS Victory in the centre, approaches Gibraltar. To the right are the ships of the van, with Vice-Admiral Samuel Barrington's 100-gun HMS Britannia, and to the left, those of the rear squadron, commanded by Vice-Admiral Mark Milbanke in the 98-gun HMS Ocean. The Franco-Spanish fleet can be seen in the background, anchored in Algeciras Bay.

In September 1782, Howe carried out the relief of Gibraltar – a difficult operation, as there were 46 French and Spanish ships-of-the-line against only 33 of his own. The exhausted state of the fleet made it impossible for Howe to fit out his ships properly or supply them with good crews, and Howe's progress to Gibraltar was hampered by the need to escort a large convoy carrying stores. Howe successfully relieved Gibraltar and then fought an indecisive action at the Battle of Cape Spartel in October 1782, after which he was able to bring his fleet safely back to Britain, bringing an effective end to the naval campaign.

== First Lord of the Admiralty ==
Howe became First Lord of the Admiralty in January 1783 during the Earl of Shelburne's ministry, resigning in April 1783 when the Duke of Portland came to power and being re-appointed in December 1783 under the Younger Pitt's first ministry. The task was often difficult, for he had to agree to extreme budgetary constraints and disappoint the hopes of many officers who were left unemployed by the peace. Nonetheless, during his time in office a number of new ships were built as part of a naval arms race with France and Spain. During his time at the Admiralty, Howe oversaw a number of innovations to signalling. Howe felt constantly undermined by Charles Middleton, the Comptroller of the Navy. Pitt often completely bypassed Howe on naval decisions and went directly to Middleton. By 1788 Howe grew tired of this and he resigned his post as First Lord despite efforts to persuade him to stay. To show their goodwill and approval of him, the government awarded Howe an Earldom on 22 July 1788.

== Spanish Armament ==
In 1790 a dispute by Britain and Spain over the Nootka Sound on the Pacific coast of North America threatened to spark a war between the two states. Howe, as one of the most senior and experienced officers still serving, was offered command of the fleet in May 1790 and took up his post in Portsmouth in July 1790. Consisting of 35 ships-of-the-line the Channel Fleet put to sea and cruised for around a month to the west of Ushant before returning to port. The crisis was then settled peacefully by diplomats and Howe was able to return to his retirement on land. During a similar crisis with Russia in 1791 known as the Russian Armament Howe was not offered any command, probably because he was suffering from ill health.

== French Revolutionary Wars ==
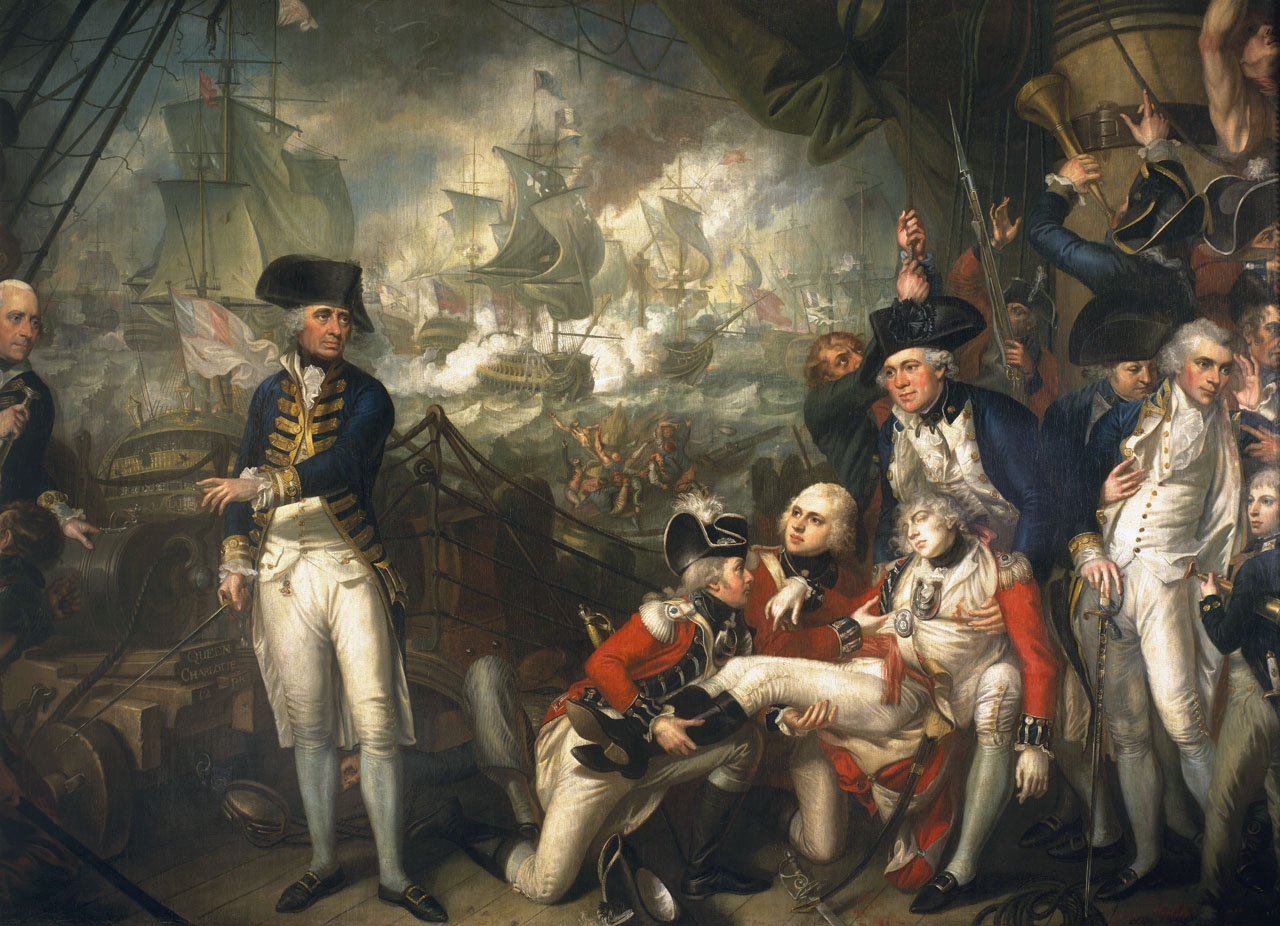
Lord Howe on the Deck of the Queen Charlotte, by Mather Brown, 1794

Following the outbreak of the French Revolutionary Wars, Howe was again given command of the Channel Fleet in 1793. In command of a British fleet of twenty-two ships he defeated a fleet of twenty-five French ships, which had been escorting a grain convoy, capturing seven of the enemy ships, at the Glorious First of June in June 1794. For this victory he received the large Naval Gold Medal and chain. He was promoted to Admiral of the Fleet on 12 March 1796.

== Later career ==
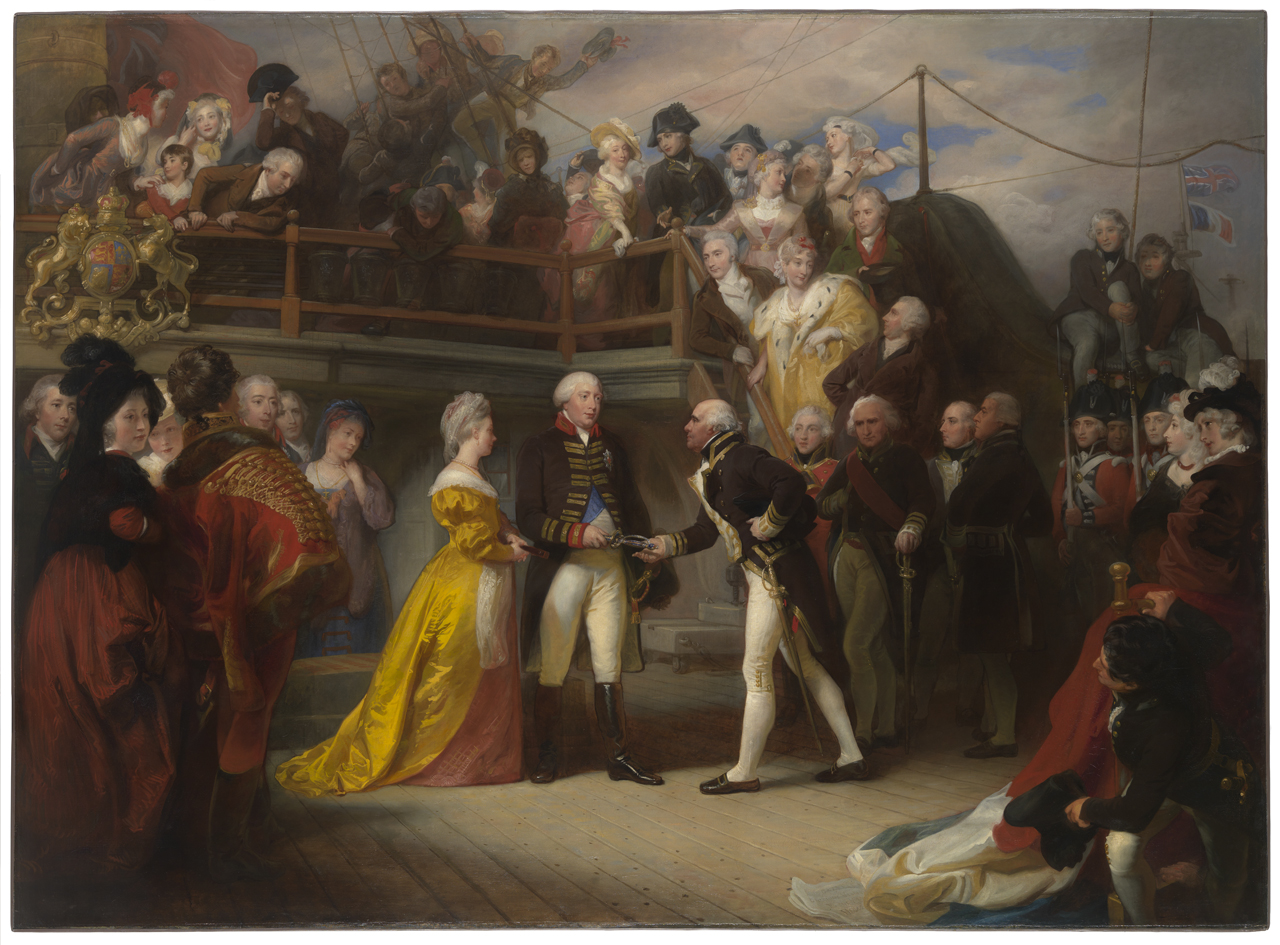
George III meeting with Howe onboard Queen Charlotte on 26 June 1794

In May 1797, Howe was called on to pacify Spithead mutineers: he spent twelve hours being rowed round the fleet and speaking to the men following which peace was restored. For this he was appointed a Knight of the Order of the Garter on 2 June 1797. Howe died at his home at 11 Grafton Street in London on 5 August 1799 and was buried in his family vault at St Andrew's Church, Langar in Nottinghamshire. His monument by John Flaxman is in the south aisle at St Paul's Cathedral.

Places named after Howe include:

- Cape Howe, on the New South Wales / Victoria border, Australia;
- Torbay Head (the southernmost point of Western Australia), Torbay Inlet and Torbay, Western Australia, named after Lord Torbay (Lord Howe);
- West Cape Howe, near Torbay, Western Australia;
- Richard Island, in Torbay, Western Australia;
- Lord Howe Island, off the east coast of Australia;
- Howe Sound, British Columbia, Canada; and
- Howe Street, in Vancouver, British Columbia.

The King George V class battleship HMS Howe bore his name.

== Family ==
On 10 March 1758 Howe married Mary Hartop; they had three daughters. His title of Earl Howe therefore became extinct with a lack of a male heir, while his viscountcy went to his younger brother, William Howe. His eldest daughter Sophia inherited his barony; she married twice, firstly to the Hon. Penn Assheton Curzon, son of Assheton Curzon, 1st Viscount Curzon, and his first wife Esther Hanmer, and secondly, in 1812, to Sir Jonathan Waller. She died on 3 December 1835 aged 73, and is buried in Holy Trinity Church, Penn, Buckinghamshire. Sophia's eldest surviving son, Richard, was created Earl Howe in 1821.

== Sources ==
- Barry, Quintin (2022). From Ushant to Gibraltar: The Channel Fleet 1778–1783. From Reason to Revolution. Warwick: Helion & Company. ISBN 9781915070395.
- Cooper, Harold Moore (1953). The Unknown Coast: Being the Explorations of Captain Matthew Flinders, R.N., Along the Shores of South Australia, 1802. Adelaide, South Australia: Harold Moore Cooper.
- Daughan, George (2011) [2008]. If By Sea: The Forging of the American Navy—from the Revolution to the War of 1812. Basic Books. ISBN 978-0-465-02514-5. OCLC 701015376.
- Davis, Chuck (1997). The greater Vancouver book: an urban encyclopaedia. Vancouver, BC: Linkman Press. ISBN 1896846009.
- Dearden, Paul F. (1980). The Rhode Island Campaign of 1778. Providence, RI: Rhode Island Bicentennial Federation. ISBN 978-0-917012-17-4. OCLC 60041024.
- Duffy, Michael (1992). The New Maritime History of Devon: From Early Times to the Late Eighteenth Century. Vol. 2. London: Conway Maritime Press. ISBN 0851776337.
- Easton, Callum, The 1797 Naval Mutinies and Popular Protest in Britain: Negotiation through Collective Action (Palgrave Macmillan, 2025) ISBN 978-3-031-98839-4, https://doi.org/10.1007/978-3-031-98840-0
- Findlay, Alexander G. (1851). A Directory for the Navigation of the Pacific Ocean: With Descriptions of Its Coasts, Islands, Etc., from the Strait of Magalhaens to the Arctic Sea, and Those of Asia and Australia : Its Winds, Currents and Other Phenomena. London: R. H. Laurie. p. 394.
- Heathcote, Tony (2002). The British Admirals of the Fleet 1734 – 1995. Pen & Sword. ISBN 0-85052-835-6.
- Joslin, E. C.; Litherland, E. C.; Simpkin, B. T. (1988). British Battles and Medals. Spink. ISBN 0907605257.
- Lodge, Edmund (1832). "Richard, Earl Howe". Portraits of Illustrious Personages of Great Britain. London: Harding and Lepard.
- Mahan, Alfred T. (1890). The Influence of Sea Power Upon History, 1660–1783. Boston: Little, Brown. p. 360. OCLC 746949269.
- Mavor, William Fordyce (1813). "Voyage round the world in 1790, 1791, 1792, 1793, 1794, and 1795. By Capt G. Vancouver". A general Collection of Voyages and Travels. London: Sherwood, Neely & Jones.
- Phillip, Arthur (1790). Stockdale, John (ed.). The Voyage of Governor Phillip to Botany Bay: With an Account of the Establishment of the Colonies of Port Jackson and Norfolk Island (3 ed.). London: John Stockdale. p. 250.
- Rodger, N. A. M. (1979). The Admiralty. Offices of State. Lavenham: T. Dalton Ltd. ISBN 0900963948.
- Rodger, N. A. M. (2006). Command of the Ocean: A Naval History of Britain, 1649–1815. Penguin Books. ISBN 978-0141026909.
- Syrett, David (2006). Admiral Lord Howe: A Biography. Spellmount. ISBN 978-1862272620.
- Wheatley, Henry B. (1891). London, past and present: a dictionary of its history, associations, and traditions. London: John Murray.

Parliament of Great Britain
Preceded by Walter Carey; John Jeffreys	Member of Parliament for Dartmouth; 1757–1782; With: John Jeffreys to 1766; Richard Hopkins 1766–1780; Arthur Holdsworth from 1780	Succeeded by Charles Brett; Arthur Holdsworth
Political offices
Preceded by The Viscount Barrington	Treasurer of the Navy; 1765–1770	Succeeded by Sir Gilbert Elliot, Bt
Preceded by The Viscount Keppel	First Lord of the Admiralty; 1783	Succeeded by The Viscount Keppel
Preceded by The Viscount Keppel	First Lord of the Admiralty; 1783–1788	Succeeded by The Earl of Chatham
Military offices
Preceded by John Forbes	Senior Naval Lord; 1763–1765	Succeeded by Sir Charles Saunders
Preceded by Richard Spry	Commander-in-Chief, Mediterranean Fleet; 1770–1774	Succeeded by Robert Man
Preceded by Samuel Graves	Commander-in-Chief, North American Station; 1776–1778	Succeeded by James Gambier
Preceded by John Forbes	Admiral of the Fleet; 1796–1799	Succeeded by Sir Peter Parker, Bt
Honorary titles
Preceded by The Lord Rodney	Vice-Admiral of Great Britain; 1792–1796	Succeeded by The Lord Bridport
Peerage of Ireland
Preceded by George Howe	Viscount Howe; 1st creation 1758–1799	Succeeded by William Howe
Preceded by George Howe	Baron Glenawley; 1758–1799	Succeeded by William Howe
Baronetage of England
Preceded by George Howe	Baronet of Compton; 1758–1799	Succeeded by William Howe
Peerage of Great Britain
New creation	Earl Howe; 1st creation 1788–1799	Extinct
New creation	Viscount Howe; 2nd creation 1782–1799	Extinct
New creation	Baron Howe; 1788–1799	Succeeded by Sophia Waller
