= William Howe, 5th Viscount Howe =

British Army officer and politician (1729–1814)

General The Right Honourable The Viscount Howe KB PC
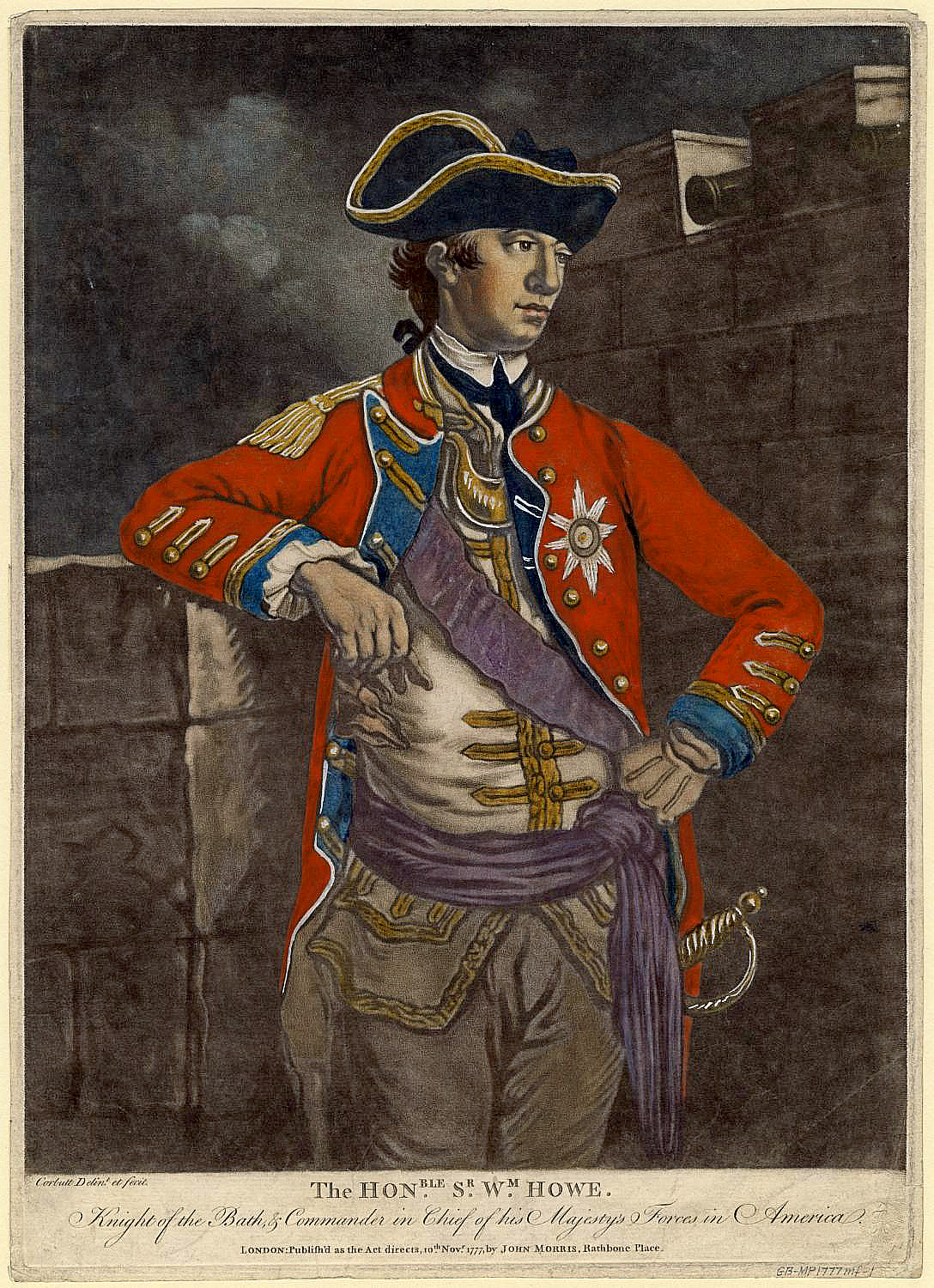
- Mezzotint, c. 1777

Commander-in-Chief, America
- In office September 1775 – May 1778
- Monarch: George III
- Preceded by: Thomas Gage
- Succeeded by: Henry Clinton

Member of Parliament for Nottingham
- In office 1758–1780 Serving with Willoughby Aston (1758–1761); Serving with John Plumptre (1761–1774); Serving with Charles Sedley (1774–1778); Serving with Abel Smith (1778–1779); Serving with Robert Smith (1779–1780)
- Preceded by: George Howe
- Succeeded by: Daniel Coke

Personal details
- Born: 10 August 1729 England
- Died: 12 July 1814 (aged 84) Twickenham, London, England
- Resting place: Twickenham, London
- Party: Whig
- Spouse: Frances Connolly (m. 1765)

Military service
- Allegiance: Great Britain; United Kingdom
- Branch/service: British Army
- Years of service: 1746–1814
- Rank: General
- Commands: Colonel, 60th (later 58th) Regiment of Foot; Colonel, 46th Regiment of Foot; Commander-in-Chief of British land forces Colonel, 19th Light Dragoons; Northern District
- Battles/wars: See battles: War of the Austrian Succession; Seven Years' War; Siege of Louisbourg; Battle of Beauport; Battle of the Plains of Abraham; Battle of Sainte-Foy; Siege of Quebec; Montreal Campaign; Capture of Belle Île; Siege of Havana; American War of Independence; Boston campaign; Battle of Bunker Hill; New York and New Jersey campaign; Battle of Long Island; Battle of Harlem Heights; Battle of Pell's Point; Battle of White Plains; Battle of Fort Washington; Philadelphia campaign; Battle of Short Hills; Battle of Cooch's Bridge; Battle of Brandywine; Battle of the Clouds; Battle of Germantown; Siege of Fort Mifflin; Battle of White Marsh; Battle of Barren Hill; French Revolutionary Wars

General William Howe, 5th Viscount Howe (10 August 1729 – 12 July 1814), was a British Army officer and politician who rose to become Commander-in-Chief, America, during the American War of Independence. Howe was one of three brothers who had distinguished military careers. In historiography of the American war, he is usually referred to as Sir William Howe to distinguish him from his brother Richard, who was 4th Viscount Howe at that time.

Howe joined the army in 1746 and saw extensive service in the War of the Austrian Succession and Seven Years' War. He became known for his role in the capture of Quebec in 1759 when he led a British force to capture the cliffs at Anse-au-Foulon, allowing James Wolfe to land his army and engage the French in the Battle of the Plains of Abraham. Howe also participated in the British offensive campaigns of Louisbourg, Belle Île and Havana. He was appointed Lieutenant-Governor of the Isle of Wight, a post he held until 1795.

Howe was sent to North America in March 1775, arriving in May after the American War of Independence broke out. After leading British troops to a costly victory in the Battle of Bunker Hill, Howe took command of all British forces in America from Thomas Gage in September of that year. Howe's record in North America was marked by the successful capture of both New York City and Philadelphia. However, poor campaign planning for 1777 contributed to the failure of John Burgoyne's Saratoga campaign, which played a major role in the entry of France into the war. Howe's role in developing those plans and the degree to which he was responsible for British failures that year (despite his personal success at Philadelphia) have both been subjects of contemporary and historic debate.

He was knighted after his successes in 1776. He resigned his post as Commander-in-Chief, British land forces in America, in 1777, and the next year returned to England, where he was at times active in the defence of the British Isles. He sat in the House of Commons from 1758 to 1780 for Nottingham. He inherited the Howe viscountcy upon the death of his brother Richard in 1799. He married, but had no children, and the viscountcy became extinct with his death in 1814.

== Early life and career ==
William Howe was born in England, the third son of Emanuel Howe, 2nd Viscount Howe and Charlotte Howe, Viscountess Howe. Charlotte was the daughter of Sophia von Kielmansegg, Countess of Leinster and Darlington, an acknowledged illegitimate half-sister of George I. His mother was a regular in the courts of George II and George III. This connection with the Crown may have improved the careers of all four sons, but all were also very capable officers. His father was an MP who also served as governor of Barbados, where he died in 1735.

Howe's eldest brother, Brigadier-general George Howe, 3rd Viscount Howe, was killed just before the 1758 Battle of Carillon near Fort Ticonderoga. Another brother, Admiral of the Fleet Richard Howe, Earl Howe, rose to become one of Britain's leading naval commanders. A third brother, Thomas, captained ships for the East India Company and wrote works on Madeira and the Comoro Islands.

William joined the British Army when he was 17 by buying a cornet's commission in the Duke of Cumberland's Regiment of Light Dragoons in 1746, being promoted to lieutenant the following year. He then served for two years in Flanders during the War of the Austrian Succession. After the war he was transferred to the 20th Regiment of Foot, where he became a friend of James Wolfe.

== Seven Years' War ==
During the Seven Years' War Howe's service first brought him to America, and did much to raise his reputation. Promoted to the rank of major in 1756, he joined the newly formed 58th (Rutlandshire) Regiment of Foot in February 1757, and was promoted to lieutenant colonel in December of that year. He commanded the regiment at the Siege of Louisbourg in 1758, leading an amphibious landing under heavy enemy fire. This action won the attackers a flanking position and earned Howe a commendation from Wolfe.

Howe commanded a light infantry battalion under General Wolfe during the 1759 Siege of Quebec. He was in the Battle of Beauport, and was chosen by Wolfe to lead the ascent from the Saint Lawrence River up to the Plains of Abraham that led to the British victory in the Battle of the Plains of Abraham on 13 September 1759. After spending the winter in the defence of Quebec City, his regiment fought in the April 1760 Battle of Sainte-Foy and subsequent siege of Quebec. He then led a brigade in the decisive Montreal Campaign under Jeffery Amherst before returning to England. Howe led a brigade in the 1761 Capture of Belle Île, off the French coast, and turned down the opportunity to become military governor after its capture so that he might continue in active service. He served as adjutant general of the force that captured Havana in 1762, playing a part in a skirmish at Guanabacoa.

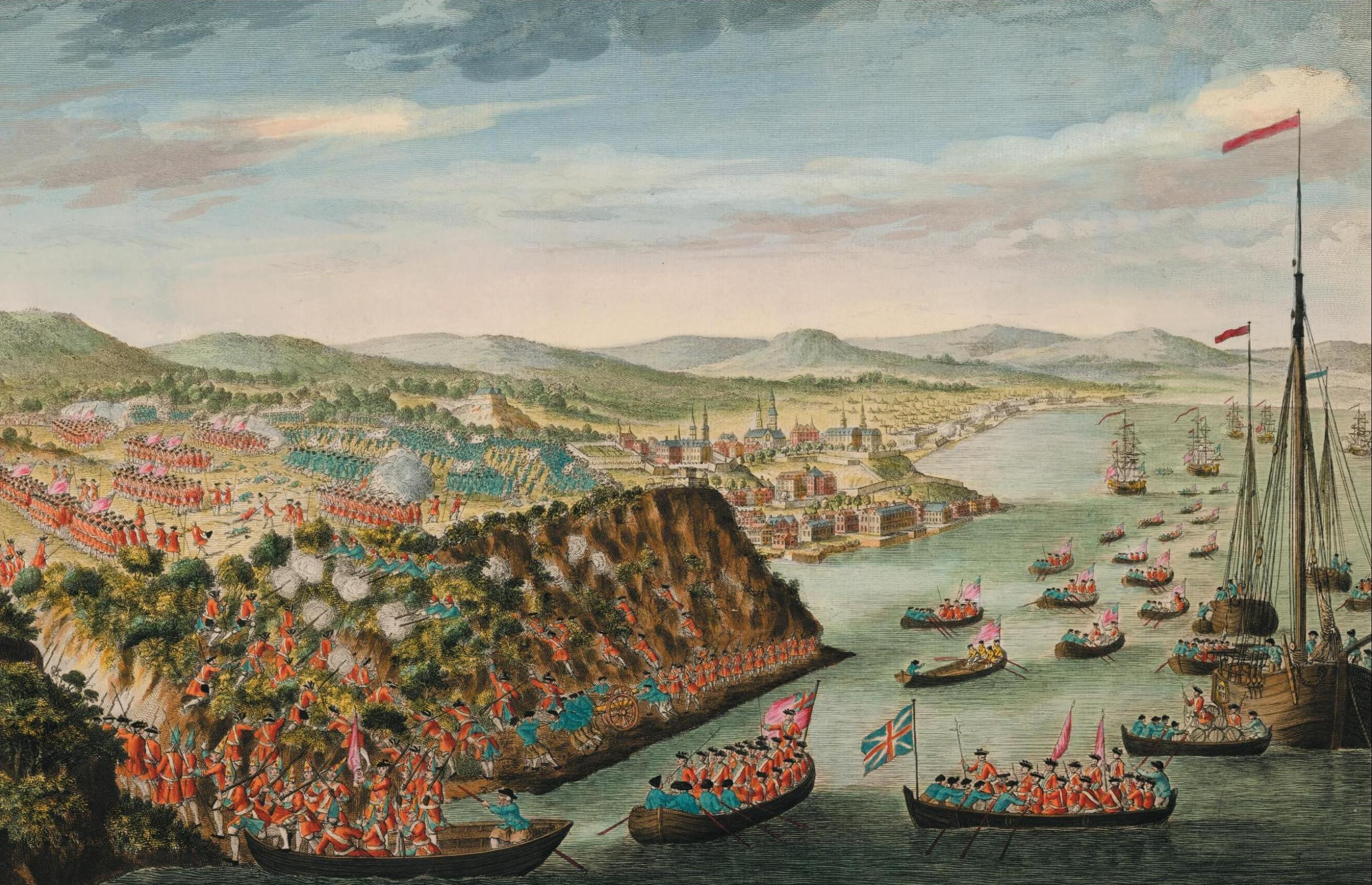
Engraving from contemporary sketch depicting the British ascent to the Plains of Abraham in 1759

In 1758, Howe was elected a member of parliament for Nottingham, succeeding to the seat vacated by his brother George's death. His election was assisted by the influence of his mother, who campaigned on behalf of her son while he was away at war, and may very well have been undertaken because service in Parliament was seen as a common way to improve one's prospects for advancement in the military. In 1764 he was promoted to colonel of the 46th (South Devonshire) Regiment of Foot, and in 1768 he was appointed lieutenant governor of the Isle of Wight. As tensions rose between Britain and the colonies in the 1770s, Howe continued to rise through the ranks, and came to be widely regarded as one of the best officers in the army. He was promoted to major general in 1772, and in 1774 introduced new training drills for light infantry companies.

In Parliament he was generally sympathetic to the American colonies. He publicly opposed the collection of legislation intended to punish the Thirteen Colonies known as Intolerable Acts, and in 1774 assured his constituents that he would resist active duty against the Americans and asserted that the entire British army could not conquer America. He also let government ministers know privately that he was prepared to serve in America as second in command to Thomas Gage, whom he knew was unpopular in government circles. In early 1775, when King George called on him to serve, he accepted, claiming publicly that if he did not, he would suffer "the odious name of backwardness to serve my country in distress." He sailed for America in March 1775, accompanied by Major Generals Henry Clinton and John Burgoyne. In May 1775 his colonelcy was transferred to the 23rd Fusiliers.

== American War of Independence ==
Howe was first sent to Boston. Privately, he did not agree with the policy of the government towards the colonists, and regretted in particular that he was sent to Boston, where the memory of his brother George was still cherished by the inhabitants, and General Gage, in whom he had no confidence, was commander-in-chief. Along with fellow British Army Generals Clinton and Burgoyne, Howe arrived there aboard HMS Cerberus on 25 May 1775, having learned en route that war had broken out with the skirmishes at the marches to Lexington and Concord in April. The Cerberus provided naval reinforcement at the Battle of Bunker Hill. He led a force of 4,000 troops sent to reinforce the 5,000 troops under General Thomas Gage who were besieged in the city after those battles. Gage, Howe, and Generals Clinton and Burgoyne discussed plans to break the siege. They formulated a plan to seize high ground around Boston and attack the besieging colonial militia forces, setting its execution for 18 June. However, the colonists learned of the plan and fortified the heights of Breed's Hill and nearby Bunker Hill on the Charlestown peninsula across the Charles River from Boston on the night of 16–17 June, forcing the British leadership to rethink their strategy.

=== Bunker Hill and Boston ===
In a war council held early on 17 June, the generals developed a plan calling for a direct assault on the colonial fortification, and Gage gave Howe command of the operation. Despite a sense of urgency (the colonists were still working on the fortifications at the time of the council), the attack, now known as the Battle of Bunker Hill, did not begin until that afternoon. With Howe personally leading the right wing of the attack, the first two assaults were firmly repulsed by the colonial defenders. Howe's third assault gained the objective, but the cost of the day's battle was appallingly heavy. The British casualties, more than 1,000 killed or wounded, were the highest of any engagement in the war. Howe described it as a "success ... too dearly bought." Although Howe exhibited courage on the battlefield, his tactics and overwhelming confidence were criticised. One subordinate wrote that Howe's "absurd and destructive confidence" played a role in the number of casualties incurred.

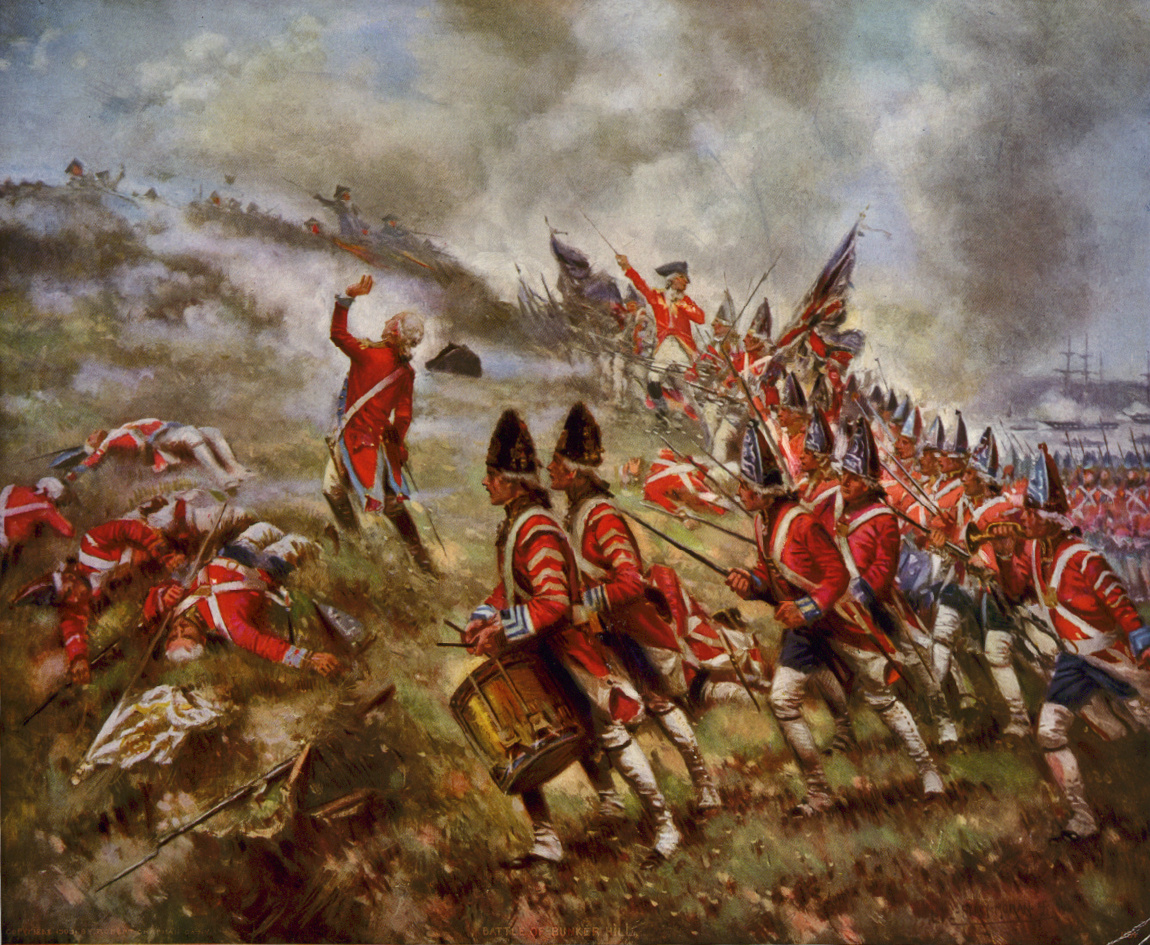
Depiction of the Battle of Bunker Hill by Percy Moran, 1909

Although Howe was not injured in the battle, it had a pronounced effect on his spirit. According to British historian George Otto Trevelyan, the battle "exercised a permanent and most potent influence" especially on Howe's behaviour, and that Howe's military skills thereafter "were apt to fail him at the very moment when they were especially wanted." Despite an outward appearance of confidence and popularity with his troops, the "genial six-footer with a face some people described as 'coarse'", privately often exhibited a lack of self-confidence, and in later campaigns became somewhat dependent on his older brother Richard (the admiral in the Royal Navy, also on station in the Colonies) for advice and approval.

On 11 October 1775, General Gage sailed for England, and Howe took over as Commander-in-Chief of British land forces in America. British military planners in London had, with the outbreak of hostilities, begun planning a massive reinforcement of the troops in North America. Their plans, made with recommendations from Howe, called for the abandonment of Boston and the establishment of bases in New York and Newport, Rhode Island in an attempt to isolate the rebellion to New England. When orders arrived in November to execute these plans, Howe opted to remain in Boston for the winter and begin the campaign in 1776. As a result, the remainder of the Siege of Boston was largely a stalemate. Howe never attempted a major engagement with the Continental Army, which had come under the command of Major General George Washington. He did, however, spend a fair amount of time at the gambling tables, and allegedly established a relationship with Elizabeth Lloyd Loring, the wife of Loyalist Joshua Loring, Jr. Loring apparently acquiesced to this arrangement, and was rewarded by Howe with the position of commissary of prisoners. Contemporaries and historians have criticised Howe for both his gambling and the amount of time he supposedly spent with Mrs. Loring, with some going so far as to level accusations that this behaviour interfered with his military activities; historian John Alden does not give these ideas credence. The alleged relationship is also mentioned in The Battle of the Kegs, an American propaganda ballad written by Francis Hopkinson. In January 1776 Howe's role as commander in chief was cemented with a promotion to full general in North America.

The siege was broken in March 1776 when Continental Army Colonel Henry Knox brought heavy artillery from Fort Ticonderoga to Boston during the winter, and General Washington used them to fortify Dorchester Heights, overlooking Boston and its harbour. Howe at first planned an assault on this position, but a snowstorm interfered, and he eventually decided to withdraw from Boston. On 17 March, British troops and Loyalists evacuated the city, and sailed for Halifax, Nova Scotia.

=== New York campaign ===
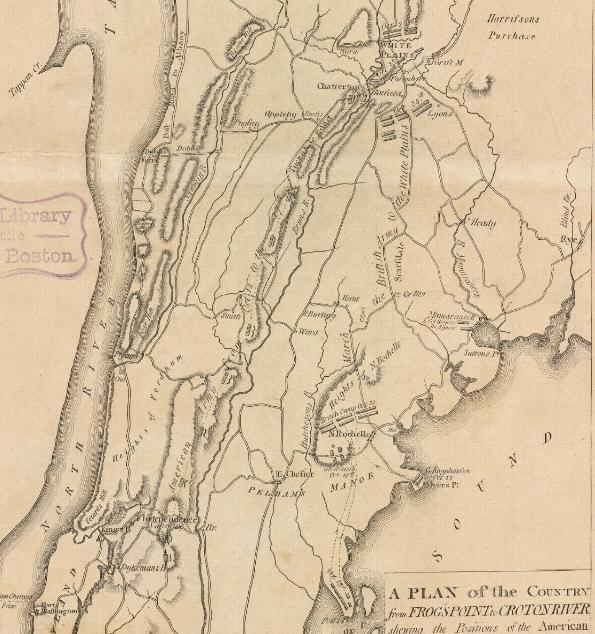
A period map depicting the British Army movements in Westchester County, New York

Howe and his troops began to arrive outside New York Harbour and made an uncontested landing on Staten Island to the west in early July. Howe, whose orders from Lord George Germain, the Secretary of State responsible for directing the war from Westminster, were fairly clear that he should avoid conflict before the arrival of reinforcements, then waited until those reinforcements arrived in mid-August, along with the naval commander, his brother Richard. This delay proved to be somewhat costly, since the Americans used this time to improve fortifications on northwestern Long Island (at Brooklyn Heights along the East River shoreline) and increased the size of their Continental Army with additional militia. After moving most of his army by amphibious barges across the Narrows to southwestern Long Island without opposition, he attacked the American positions on 27 August in what became known as the Battle of Long Island. In a well-executed manoeuvre, a large column led by Howe and Clinton passed around the American left flank and through the lightly guarded Jamaica Pass far to the east (a ridge of hills running east to west bisected the island, with a series of lower entrances that were all guarded by Continentals except inexplicably to the farthest east at Jamaica), catching the Patriots off-guard and routing the Americans from their forward positions back into the entrenchments on Brooklyn Heights. Despite the urging of Clinton and others, Howe decided against an immediate assault on these fortifications, claiming "the Troops had for that day done handsomely enough." He instead began siege operations, methodically advancing on the entrenched Americans. This decision allowed General Washington to successfully orchestrate a nighttime strategic withdrawal across the East River on the night of 29–30 August, aided by a thick morning fog. Historian George Bilias notes that had Howe attacked Brooklyn Heights, the capture of even half of Washington's army, and possibly Washington himself, might have had a significant effect on the rebellion. Some officers, notably General Clinton, were critical of Howe's decision not to storm the American works. Howe was knighted as a reward for his victory on Long Island.

Howe and his brother Richard had, as part of their instructions, been assigned roles as peace commissioners, with limited authority to treat with the rebels. After Long Island, they pursued an attempt at reconciliation, sending the captured General John Sullivan to Philadelphia with a proposal for a peace conference. The meeting that resulted, conducted by Admiral Howe, was unsuccessful. The Howes had been given limited powers, as had the Congressional representatives, and the latter were insistent that the British recognise the recently declared colonial independence. This was not within the Howes' powers, so the conference failed, and Howe then continued the campaign. He first landed troops on Manhattan on 15 September and occupied New York City (which then covered only Lower Manhattan), although his advance northward on Upper Manhattan was checked the next day at Harlem Heights. He paused, spending nearly one month consolidating control of New York City and awaiting reinforcements. During this time he ordered the execution of Nathan Hale for espionage and had to deal with the effects of a major fire in the city. He then attempted a landing on the mainland at Throgs Neck, intending to flank Washington's position at Harlem Heights. However, the narrow causeway between the beach and the mainland was well-defended, and he ended up withdrawing the troops. He made a successful landing of troops at Pell's Point in Westchester County, but Washington managed to avoid being flanked, retreating to White Plains. Howe successfully forced Washington out of the New York area in the 28 October Battle of White Plains, and then turned his attention to consolidate British hold on Manhattan. In November he attacked the remaining Continental Army stronghold in the Battle of Fort Washington, taking several thousand prisoners.

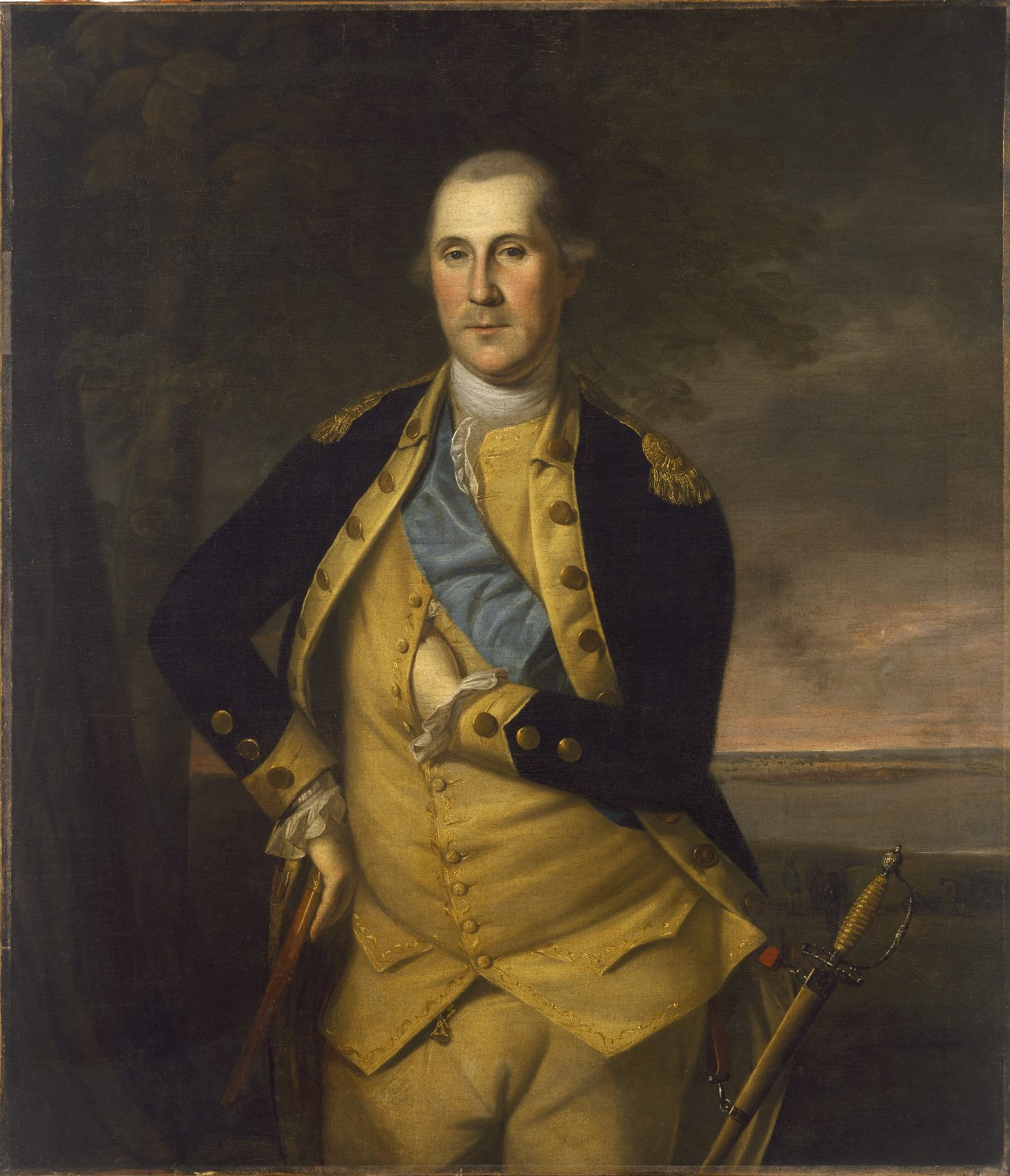
George Washington, driven from New York beginning at the Battle of Brooklyn portrait by Charles Willson Peale 1776

Washington then retreated across New Jersey, followed by Howe's advance forces under Charles Cornwallis. At this point, Howe prepared troops under the command of General Clinton for embarkation to occupy Newport, the other major goal of his plan. Clinton proposed that these troops instead be landed in New Jersey, either opposite Staten Island or on the Delaware River, trapping Washington or even capturing the seat of the Continental Congress, Philadelphia. Howe rejected these proposals, despatching Clinton and General Hugh, Earl Percy, two vocal critics of his leadership, to take Newport. In early December, Howe came to Trenton, New Jersey to arrange the disposition of his troops for the winter. Washington had retreated all the way across the Delaware, and Howe returned to New York, believing the campaign to be ended for the season. When Washington attacked the Hessian quarters at Trenton on 26 December 1776, Howe sent Cornwallis to reform the army in New Jersey and chase after Washington. Cornwallis was frustrated in this, with Washington gaining a second victory at Trenton and a third at Princeton. Howe recalled the army to positions much closer to New York for the winter.

Howe has been criticised by contemporaries and historians for failing to decisively defeat the Continental Army during the New York campaign. Contemporaries complained that his landing in Westchester failed to trap Washington, but failed to understand that his goal in the campaign was to secure Manhattan, and not necessarily to defeat Washington. However, historian George Billias observes that Howe's overly rigid adherence to his plans meant that he was unable to capitalise on the opportunities that arose during the campaign for a decisive action.

=== Philadelphia campaign ===
On 30 November 1776, as Washington was retreating across New Jersey, Howe had written to Germain with plans for the 1777 campaign season. He proposed to send a 10,000-man force up the Hudson River to capture Albany, New York, in conjunction with an expedition sent south from Province of Quebec. He again wrote to Germain on 20 December 1776 with more elaborate proposals for 1777. These again included operations to gain control of the Hudson River, and included expanded operations from the base at Newport, and an expedition to take Philadelphia. The latter Howe saw as attractive, since Washington was then just north of the city: Howe wrote that he was "persuaded the Principal Army should act offensively [against Philadelphia], where the enemy's chief strength lies." Germain acknowledged that this plan was particularly "well digested", but it called for more men than Germain was prepared to provide. After the setbacks in New Jersey, Howe in mid-January 1777 proposed operations against Philadelphia that included an overland expedition and a sea-based attack, thinking this might lead to a decisive victory over the Continental Army. This plan was developed to the extent that in April, Howe's army was seen constructing pontoon bridges; Washington, lodged in his winter quarters at Morristown, New Jersey, thought they were for eventual use on the Delaware River. However, by mid-May Howe had apparently abandoned the idea of an overland expedition: "I propose to invade Pennsylvania by sea ... we must probably abandon the Jersies."

When the campaign season opened in May 1777, General Washington moved most of his army from its winter quarters in Morristown, New Jersey to a strongly fortified position in the Watchung Mountains. In June 1777, Howe began a series of odd moves in New Jersey, apparently in an attempt to draw Washington and his army out of that position onto terrain more favourable for a general engagement. His motives for this are uncertain; historian John Buchanan argues that Howe was determined to attempt to draw Washington into a major engagement while both were in northern New Jersey, writing that "Washington's shift in position had whetted Howe's appetite for a major action when, if everything went right, he would finally accomplish what he and his brother's policies had denied him the previous year: the destruction of the Continental Army", but that Howe's underlying campaign goal for the season was Philadelphia. One British major wrote that "[t]he report circulated by those in power is that it was thought necessary to march to Hilsborough [sic] to offer Washington battle." Americans like Henry Knox were perplexed but also concluded that was its purpose: "It was unaccountable that [the British] should stop short when they had gone only nine miles ... In the course of a day or two [we] discovered that they ... had come out with an intention of drawing us into the plain." Washington had intelligence that Howe had moved without taking the heavy river-crossing equipment, and was apparently not fooled at all.

When Washington refused to take the bait, Howe withdrew the army to Perth Amboy, under harassment by Colonel Daniel Morgan's skirmisher unit, Morgan's Riflemen, who used their superior weapons to snipe at and harry his forces as they moved. Washington moved down to a more exposed position, assuming Howe was going to embark his army on ships. Howe then launched a lightning strike designed to cut Washington's retreat off. This attempt was foiled by the Battle of Short Hills, which gave Washington time to retreat to a more secure position. Howe then did in fact embark his army and sailed south with his brother's fleet. Howe maintained an effective secrecy surrounding the fleet's destination: not only did Washington not know where it was going, neither did many British rank and file.

Howe's campaign for Philadelphia began with an amphibious landing at Head of Elk, Maryland, southwest of the city in late August. Although Howe would have preferred to make a landing on the Delaware River below Philadelphia, reports of well-prepared defences dissuaded him, and the fleet spent almost an entire extra month at sea to reach Head of Elk. Howe's army left Head of Elk early on 3 September 1777 and pushed back an advance guard of American light infantry at Cooch's Bridge. On 11 September 1777, Howe's army met Washington's near Chadds Ford along the Brandywine Creek in the Battle of Brandywine. Howe established his headquarters at the Gilpin Homestead, where it stayed until the morning of 16 September. In a reprise of earlier battles, Howe once again flanked the Continental Army position and forced Washington to retreat after inflicting heavy casualties.

After two weeks of manoeuvre and engagements (including The Battle of the Clouds, The Battle of Paoli, and an engagement at Valley Forge where Alexander Hamilton was nearly killed in action), Howe triumphantly entered the city on 26 September. The reception Howe received was not quite what he had expected, however. He had been led to believe that "Friends thicker than Woods" would greet him upon his arrival; he instead was greeted by women, children, and many deserted houses. Despite Howe's best attempts to minimise any misconduct by his troops (he authorised the execution of violators of his orders against it), marauding soldiers greatly impacted the public opinion of his army.

One week after Howe entered Philadelphia, on 4 October, Washington made a dawn attack on the British garrison at Germantown. He came close to winning the battle before being repulsed by belated reinforcements sent from the city. This forced Howe to withdraw his troops a little closer to the city, where they were also needed to help clear the American Delaware River defences, which were preventing the navy from resupplying the army. It was late November before this task was accomplished, which included a poorly executed attack on Fort Mercer by a division of Hessians commanded by Colonel von Donop and an advance fleet commanded by Admiral Francis Reynolds.

=== Impact on Burgoyne's campaign ===
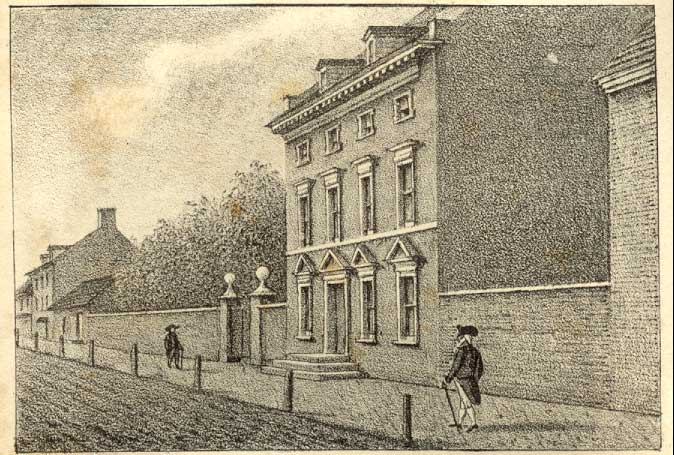
Howe made the Masters-Penn mansion his headquarters during the 1777–1778 British occupation of Philadelphia. It later served as the presidential mansion of George Washington and John Adams, 1790–1800.

Concomitant with Howe's campaign, General Burgoyne led his expedition south from Montreal to capture Albany. Burgoyne's advance was stopped in the Battles of Saratoga in September and October, and he surrendered his army on 17 October. Burgoyne's surrender, coupled with Howe's near defeat at Germantown, dramatically altered the strategic balance of the conflict. Support for the Continental Congress, suffering from Howe's successful occupation of Philadelphia, was strengthened, and the victory encouraged France to enter the war against Britain. Burgoyne's loss also further weakened the British government of Lord North.

Burgoyne made his advance under the assumption that he would be met in Albany by Howe or troops sent by Howe. Burgoyne was apparently not aware that Howe's plans had evolved as they had. Although Germain knew what Howe's plans were, whether he communicated them to Burgoyne is unclear. Some sources claim he did while others state that Burgoyne was not notified of the changes until the campaign was well underway. Whether Germain, Howe and Burgoyne had the same expectations about the degree to which Howe was supposed to support the invasion from Quebec is also unclear. Some historians argue that Howe failed to follow instructions and essentially abandoned Burgoyne's army, while others suggest that Burgoyne failed on his own and then tried to shift the blame to Howe and Clinton.

Howe's decision to focus his own activity on an expedition to Philadelphia may have been motivated by competition with General Burgoyne, who was given command of the northern force despite lobbying by Howe for its command to be given to Clinton. John Alden notes the jealousies among the British leaders, saying, "It is likely that [Howe] was as jealous of Burgoyne as Burgoyne was of him and that he was not eager to do anything which might assist his junior up the ladder of military renown." Along the same lines historian Don Higginbotham concludes that in Howe's view, "It [the northern campaign] was Burgoyne's whole show, and consequently he [Howe] wanted little to do with it. With regard to Burgoyne's army, he would do only what was required of him (virtually nothing)."

Howe himself wrote to Burgoyne on 17 July that he intended to stay close to Washington: "My intention is for Pennsylvania, where I expect to meet Washington, but if he goes to the northward contrary to my expectations, and you can keep him at bay, be assured I shall soon be after him to relieve you." This suggested that Howe would follow Washington if he went north to assist in the defence of the Hudson. Howe, however, sailed from New York on 23 July. On 30 August, shortly after his arrival at Head of Elk, Howe wrote to Germain that he would be unable to assist Burgoyne, citing a lack of Loyalist support in the Philadelphia area. A small force sent north from New York by General Clinton in early October was also unable to assist Burgoyne.

=== Resignation ===
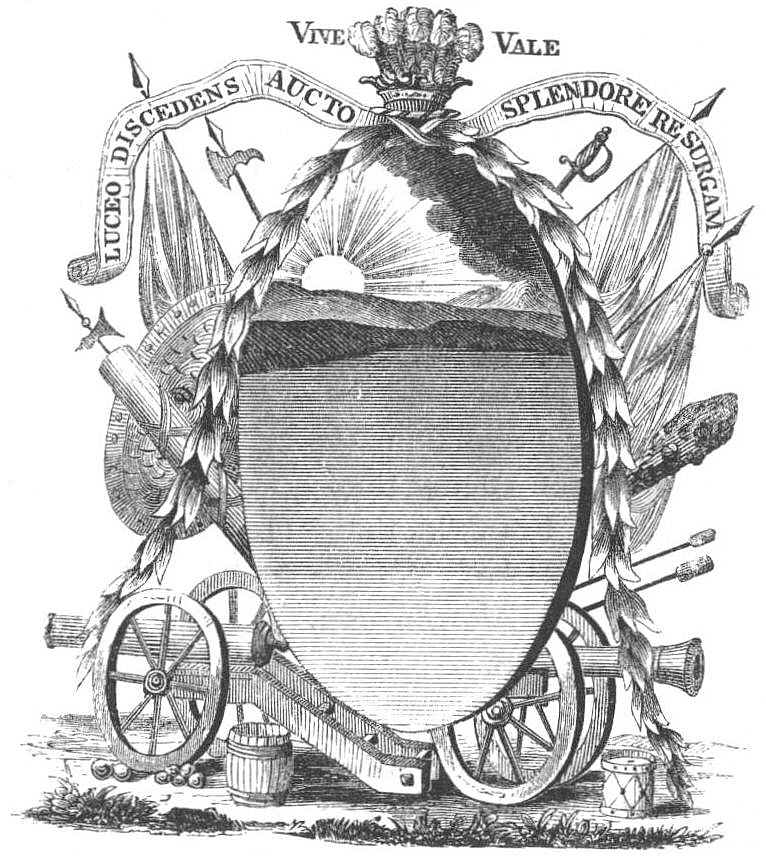
Artwork on the tickets to the Mischianza

In late October 1777, Howe sent a letter of his resignation of his command to London, complaining that he had been inadequately supported in that year's campaigns. He was finally notified in April 1778 via a return letter that his resignation was accepted. A grand party, known as the "Mischianza", was thrown for the departing general on 18 May. Organized by his aides John André and Oliver De Lancey Jr., the party featured a grand parade, fireworks, and dancing until dawn. Washington, aware that the British were planning to evacuate Philadelphia, sent the Marquis de Lafayette out with a small force on the night of the party to determine British movements. This movement was noticed by alert British troops, and Howe ordered a column out to entrap the marquis. In the Battle of Barren Hill, Lafayette escaped the trap with minimal casualties.

On 24 May 1778, Howe left Philadelphia on a ship bound for England. That same day, General Clinton took over as commander-in-chief of British armies in America, and made preparations for an overland march to New York. Howe arrived back in England on 1 July, where he and his brother faced censure for their actions in North America. It is likely that the resignation of both William and his brother Richard was due to their desire to hurry home to vindicate their conduct during the campaign. In 1779, Howe and his brother demanded a parliamentary inquiry into their actions. The inquiry that followed was unable to confirm any charges of impropriety or mismanagement leveled against either of them. Because of the inconclusive nature of the inquiry, attacks continued to be made against Howe in pamphlets and the press, and in 1780 he published a response to accusations leveled by Loyalist Joseph Galloway, who issued a reply that harshly criticized the general's conduct and accused him of deliberately undermining the war effort for the benefit of the anti-war Whig faction in Parliament.

== Later life ==
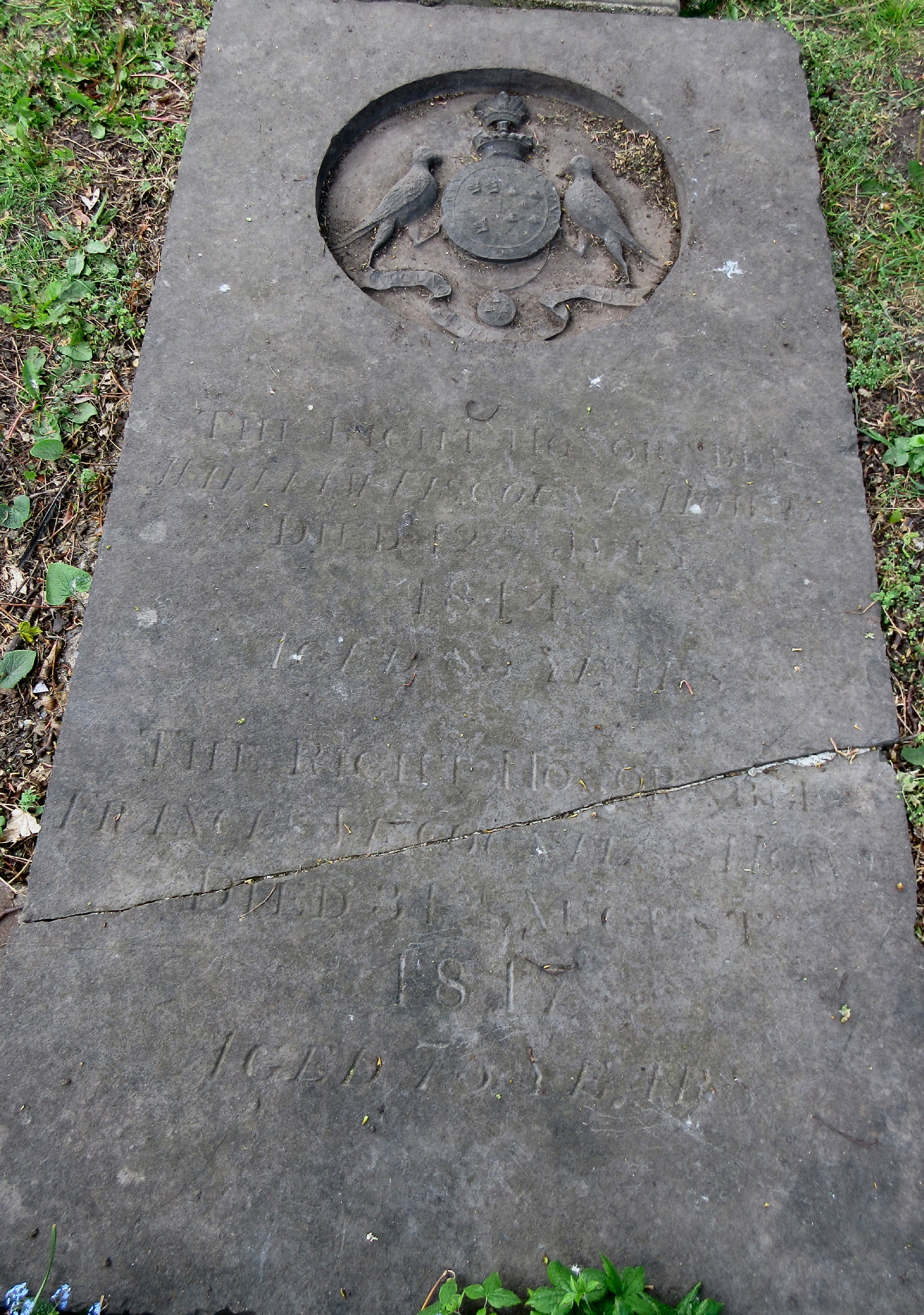
Tomb in Holly Road Garden of Rest

In 1780, Howe lost in his bid to be re-elected to the House of Commons. In 1782, he was named lieutenant general of the ordnance and appointed to the Privy Council. His colonelcy was transferred from the 23rd Fusiliers to the 19th Light Dragoons in 1786. He resumed limited active duty in 1789, when a crisis with Spain over territorial claims in northwestern North America threatened to boil over into war. He was placed in command of the forces organized for action against Spain, but the crisis was resolved and Howe did not see further action until 1793, when the French Revolutionary Wars involved Britain. He was promoted to full general in 1793, and commanded Northern District from 1793 and Eastern District from 1795. In 1795, he was appointed governor of Berwick-on-Tweed.

When his brother Richard died in 1799 without surviving male issue, Howe inherited the Irish titles and became the 5th Viscount Howe and Baron Glenawley. In 1803, he resigned as lieutenant general of the ordnance, citing poor health. In 1808, he was appointed governor of Plymouth. He died at Twickenham in 1814 after a long illness. (Note: Many sources, including the DNB, presume that he was at Plymouth when he died. This frequent error is probably based on an early misreading of his obituary, published in The Gentleman's Magazine in 1814 (The Gentleman's Magazine, Volume 116, p. 93). The obituary does not state that he died there, however. Furthermore, an annual register records his death at Twickenham, as do the editors of Hadden's Journal (Edinburgh Annual Register, for 1814, p. cdxlvii; Hadden, p. 380).)

Howe had married Frances Connolly, often referred to as Fanny, in 1765. Their marriage was childless. Therefore, his titles died with him. His wife survived him by three years. Both are buried in Holly Road Garden of Rest, Twickenham.

== In popular culture ==
Howe appears as an antagonist in the supernatural television series Sleepy Hollow, played in flashbacks by Nicholas Guest and depicted as a ruthless, cruel leader who was acquainted with protagonist Ichabod Crane (Tom Mison) before Crane defected to the United States during the War of Independence; he is later resurrected in the present as a zombie, but is destroyed by Crane using Greek fire.

Howe's remains are a plot point in the Bones episode "The Resurrection in the Remains", a crossover with Sleepy Hollow, in which Howe's decapitated skull is used as a murder weapon. The series also establishes that he was buried beneath an American church instead of Twickenham.

Howe is also featured in "Howe's Masquerade" and "Old Esther Dudley", two of the stories that make up Nathaniel Hawthorne's Legends of the Province House, a quartet of tales that first appeared in 1838–1839.

In Harry Turtledove's Atlantis series of alternate history novels, Howe is an antagonist in The United States of Atlantis.

== Notes ==
Court offices
Preceded by Hon. Bluett Wallop	Page of Honour; 1744–1747	Succeeded by Hon. George West
Parliament of Great Britain
Preceded by The Viscount Howe; Sir Willoughby Aston, Bt	Member of Parliament for Nottingham; 1758–1780; With: Sir Willoughby Aston, Bt 1758–1761; John Plumptre 1761–1774; Sir Charles Sedley 1774–1778; Abel Smith 1778–1779; Robert Smith 1779–1780	Succeeded by Robert Smith; Daniel Parker Coke
Military offices
Preceded by Hon. Thomas Murray	Colonel of the 46th Regiment of Foot; 1764–1775	Succeeded by Hon. John Vaughan
Preceded by Hon. George Boscawen	Colonel of the 23rd Regiment of Foot; 1775–1786	Succeeded by Richard Grenville
Preceded by Thomas Gage	Commander-in-Chief, America; 1775–1778	Succeeded by Sir Henry Clinton
Preceded by The Lord Amherst	Lieutenant-General of the Ordnance; 1782–1804	Succeeded by Sir Thomas Trigge
Preceded by Sir John Burgoyne, Bt	Colonel of the 19th Regiment of (Light) Dragoons; 1786–1814	Succeeded by Sir William Payne, Bt
New post	GOC Northern District; 1793–1795	Succeeded by The Duke of Gloucester and Edinburgh
Preceded by Hon. John Vaughan	Governor of Berwick-upon-Tweed; 1795–1808	Succeeded by Banastre Tarleton
Preceded by The Viscount Lake	Governor of Plymouth; 1808–1814	Succeeded by The Duke of Richmond
Peerage of Ireland
Preceded by Richard Howe	Viscount Howe; 1799–1814	Extinct
Preceded by Richard Howe	Baron Glenawley; 1799–1814	Extinct
Baronetage of England
Preceded by Richard Howe	Baronet of Compton; 1799–1814	Extinct
