= Portrait of Countess Howe (Gainsborough) =

1764 painting by Thomas Gainsborough

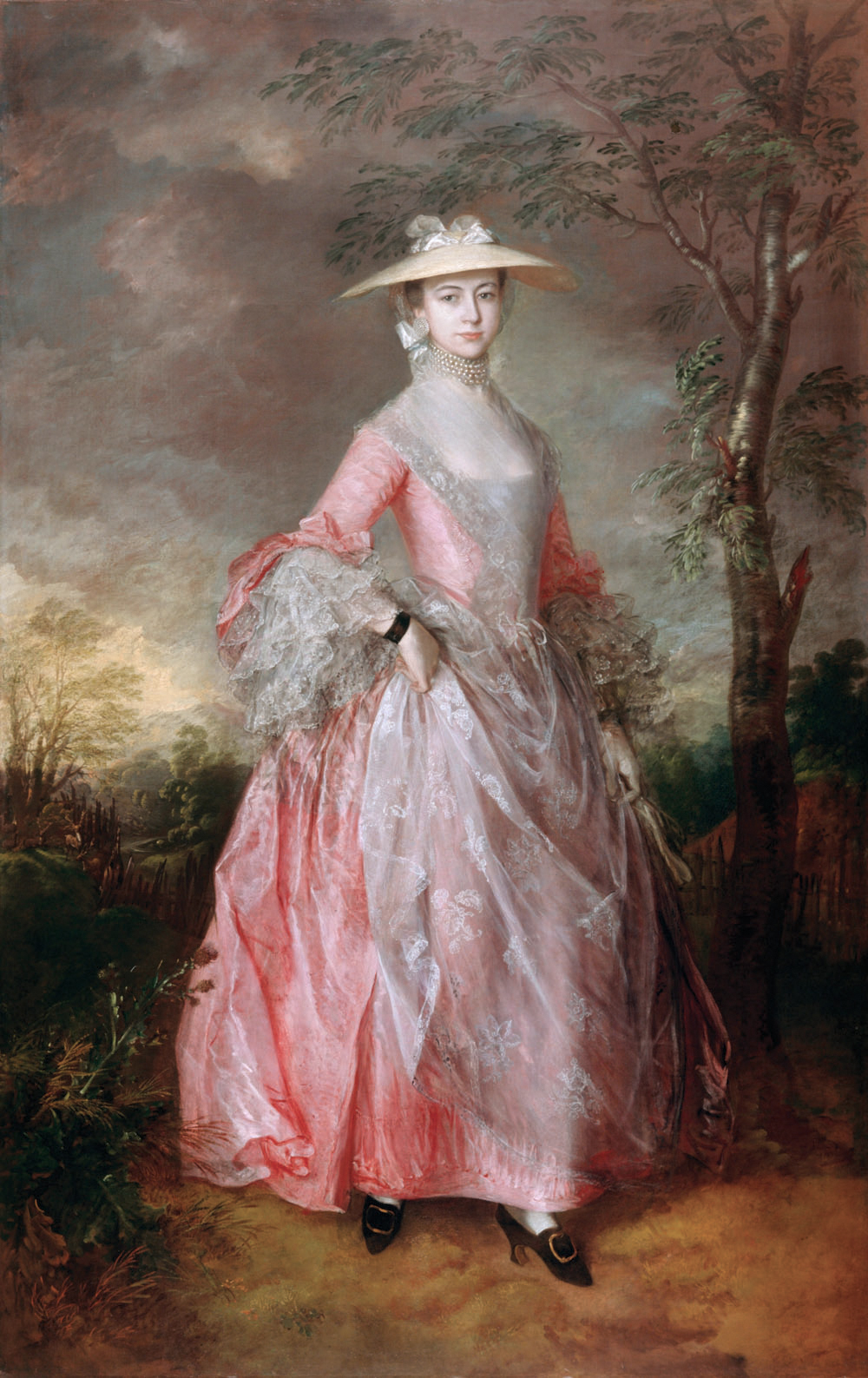
- Artist: Thomas Gainsborough
- Year: 1764
- Type: Oil on canvas, portrait painting
- Dimensions: 244 cm × 152.4 cm (96 in × 60.0 in)
- Location: Kenwood House; London

Portrait of Countess Howe is an oil on canvas portrait painting by the British artist Thomas Gainsborough, from 1764. It depicts the English aristocrat Mary, Countess Howe, the wife of the Royal Navy officer Richard Howe.

== History and description ==
Her husband is today best known for his later success as an admiral during the relief of the Great Siege of Gibraltar and at the Glorious First of June.

Her husband had served in the navy from a young age and had unexpectedly inherited the title when his elder brother George was killed in action in 1758. The couple had married earlier that year and six years later were in Bath where Richard was recovering from illness, when they sat for a pair of full-length portraits by Gainsborough. The artist had moved to the fashionable spa town of Bath from Suffolk and built up a successful portrait business.

The painting is in the collection of English Heritage at Kenwood House, in Highgate, having been part of the Iveagh Bequest of 1929.

== Bibliography ==
- Bruce, Anthony. Encyclopedia of Naval History. Routledge, 2014.
- Bryant, Juliua. Kenwood: Catalogue of Paintings in the Iveagh Bequest. Yale University Pewss, 2003.
- Flavell, Julie. The Howe Dynasty: The Untold Story of a Military Family and the Women Behind Britain's Wars for America. 2021.
- French, Anne (ed.) The Earl and Countess Howe by Gainsborough: A Bicentenary Exhibition. English Heritage, 1988.
- Hamilton, James. Gainsborough: A Portrait. Hachette UK, 2017.
- Murray, Christopher John. Encyclopedia of the Romantic Era, 1760-1850, Volume 2. Taylor & Francis, 2004.
