= Hinchinbrook Farm Society =

Special needs organization in Blockhouse, Nova Scotia, Canada

Hinchinbrook Farm Society is a volunteer and non-profit organization for families of special needs children. The farm is located in Blockhouse, Nova Scotia and maintains standards set forth by the Canadian Therapeutic Riding Association (CanTRA). Hinchinbrook Farm provides therapeutic riding to families with Autism Spectrum Disorder (ASD) by employing the "Horse Boy Method". The therapeutic riding program is one of four in Nova Scotia which is registered with the Nova Scotia Equestrian Federation.

Hinchinbrook Farm was created by Patricia McGill in 2007 in order to provide therapeutic riding to children who are mentally challenged. In 2010 the decision was made to have it run as a registered charity. This was formed with aid from the original volunteer parents and community leaders (Hinchinbrook Farm Society). As of 2018, there were 51 volunteers and 40 children in the Therapeutic Riding Program and 25 families on the Horse Boy Method.

== Documentary ==
An hour long documentary was aired in 2017. The documentary appeared on CBC's documentary program as part of a Tell Tale Productions Inc documentary. Filming began in August 2016 with director Jackie Torrens, producer Erin Oakes and executive producer Edward Peill.

== Awards ==
- 2014 - Doctor Gerald Gordon Memorial Award
- 2016 - Therapy Horse of the Year from Atlantic Horse and Pony Magazine.
