= Clara Elisabeth von Platen =

German noblewoman (1648–1700)

Clara Elisabeth Countess von Platen-Hallermund
- Countess von Platen-Hallermund
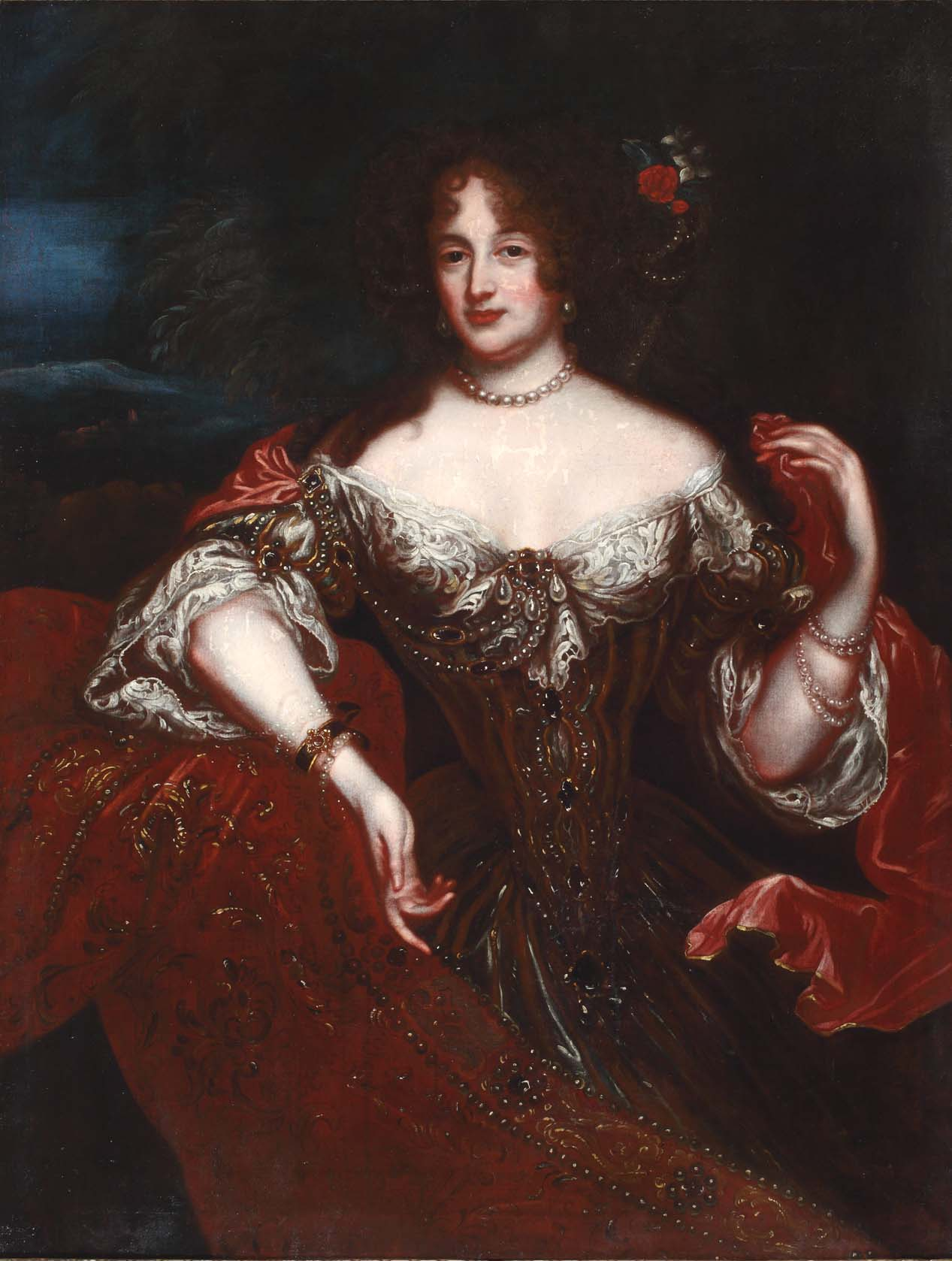
- Born: 14 January 1648
- Died: 30 January 1700 (aged 52)
- Spouses: Franz Ernst, Baron (later Count) von Platen
- Issue: Baron / Count Ernest August; Sophia von Kielmansegg, Countess of Darlington
- Father: Georg Philipp von Meisenbuch
- Mother: Anna Elisabeth von Meisenbuch

Clara Elisabeth, Countess von Platen-Hallermund (14 January 1648 – 30 January 1700, Schloss Monplaisir, in what is now the Von-Alten-Garten in Hannover), was a German noblewoman, most notable as the mistress of Ernest Augustus (Elector of Hanover, father of George I of Great Britain) and for her involvement in the Königsmarck affair.

== Early life ==
She was the eldest daughter of Georg Philipp von Meisenbuch-Züschen (1610–1669) and his wife, who was also his relative, Anna Elisabeth von Meisenbuch (1620–1681).

== Court life ==
Clara Elisabeth's father tried to get her and her sister Catharina positions at the French court at Versailles. When this attempt failed, he placed them at the court of Ernest Augustus, where Clara Elisabeth served as lady-in-waiting to the Duchess Sophia and attracted the Duke's attention. Exerting great influence on him, she had two children with him: Ernst August (1674–1726) and Sophia von Kielmansegg (1675–1717). In spite of being the Duke's / Elector's life-long mistress, Clara Elisabeth was married to Franz Ernst, Baron / Count (Reichsgraf since 1689) von Platen-Hallermund (1631–1709).

== Bibliography ==
- Paul Gerhard Zeidler: Elisabeth von Platen, eine deutsche Pompadour. Roman 1921
- Paul Morand: Sophie Dorothea von Celle. Die Geschichte eines Lebens und einer Liebe. Christian Wegner Verlag 1968, ISBN 3-9800226-0-9
- Thea Leitner: Skandal bei Hof – Frauenschicksale an europäischen Königshöfen. Piper Verlag München 1997, ISBN 3-492-22009-6
- Elisabeth E. Kwan / Anna Eunike Röhrig: Vergessene Frauen der Welfen. Göttingen : MatrixMedia Verl. 2008, ISBN 978-3-932313-30-1
- Elisabeth E. Kwan / Anna Eunike Röhrig: Frauen vom Hof der Welfen. 20 Biografien. Göttingen : MatrixMedia Verl. 2006, ISBN 3-932313-17-8
