= Blockhouse, Nova Scotia =

Community in Nova Scotia, Canada

Coordinates: 44°26′51″N 64°24′46″W

Blockhouse in Nova Scotia

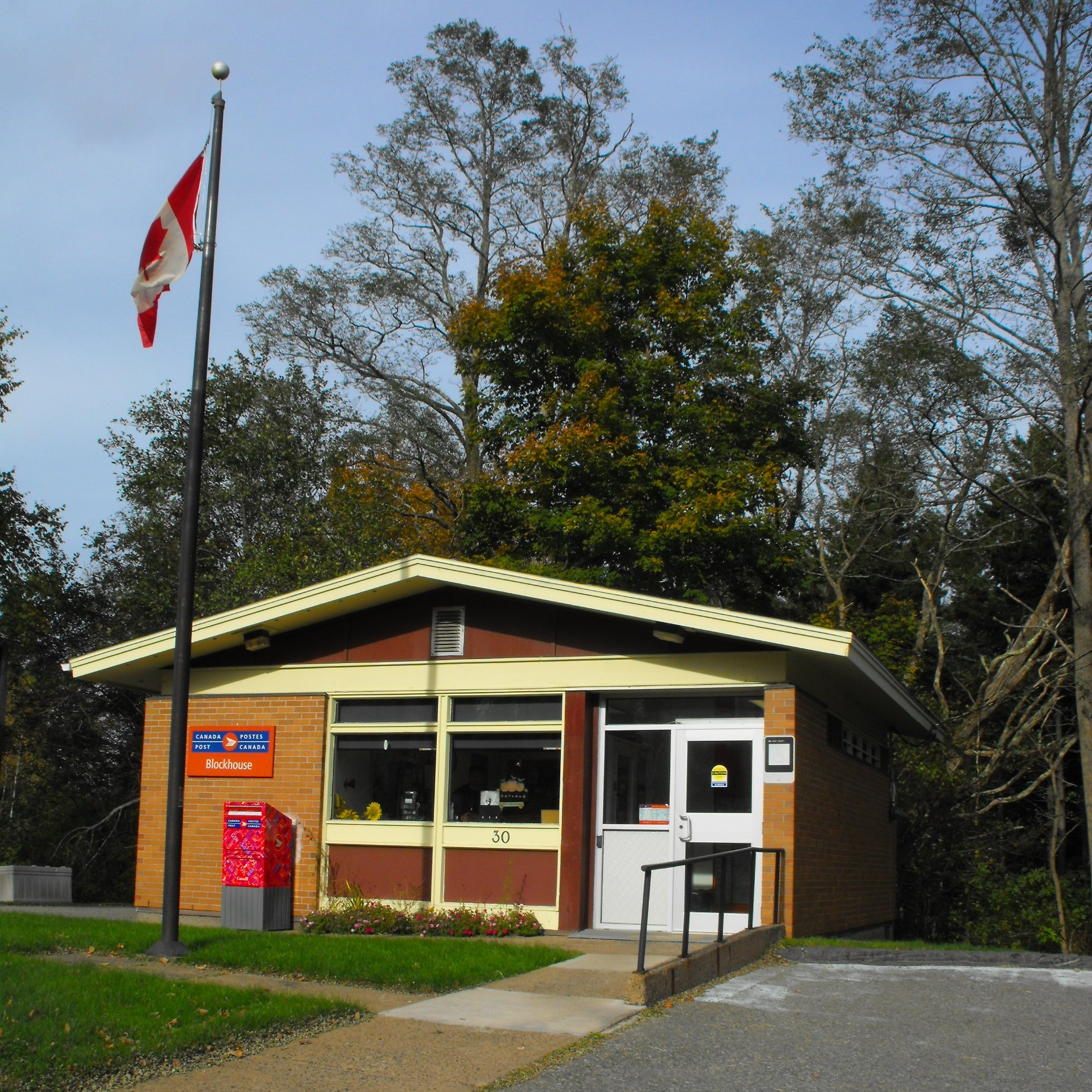
Post office in Blockhouse

Blockhouse is a community in the Canadian province of Nova Scotia, located in the Lunenburg Municipal District in Lunenburg County. It was named after the blockhouses constructed by Captain Ephraim Cook to protect colonists following a raid in 1756. The final blockhouse in the community burned down in 1874.

Blockhouse is home to the oldest Waldorf-focused school in the Atlantic provinces. An independent school, it is based on theoretical foundations laid down by Rudolf Steiner and adheres to the principle that any child desiring a Steiner education (referred to as Waldorf education in North America) should receive one. It offers K-9 education.

Blockhouse is home to the Hinchinbrook Farm Society. This is a non-profit charitable organization and provides programs in therapeutic riding and Horse Boy Methods. Year-round equine assisted learning and activities for children with disabilities or on the autistic spectrum.

A sustainability project was launched in Blockhouse in 2012: It was a non-profit, sustainability and community integration project. Working under the conditions of a lease granted by Lunenburg County Council, volunteers worked to show how an abandoned 16,000 sq foot municipal building could be transformed into a community hub: creating recreation space for families, working towards a community kitchen, presenting traditional methods in growing and preserving foods, incubating small, local businesses and dedicated to permaculture ideals and processes. Work occurred with straw baling, earthen plasters, use of surplus books in walls and floors for insulation, and experiments with solar showers. This was visionary project that had gained members across Canada and attention from around the world. It also received antagonism from immediate neighbors, was unable to maintain or increase its local support, and folded in 2015. The land has been privately purchased and the future of the site is not commonly known.

== History ==
During the French and Indian War, a British and their native allies fought against the French, Acadians, and Mi'kmaq. Following the 1756 raid on Lunenburg, Governor Lawrence sought to protect the area by establishing blockhouses at the LaHave River, Mush-a-Mush (present-day Mahone Bay) and at the Northwest Range (present day Blockhouse, Nova Scotia). Despite the protection of these blockhouses, the Mi'kmaq and Acadians continued raiding the area, executing eight such raids over the next three years. A total of 32 people from Lunenburg were killed in the raids with more being taken prisoner.

There were two Mi'kmaq raids on Blockhouse in 1758. In March, there was a raid on the Lunenburg Peninsula at the Northwest Range (present-day Blockhouse, Nova Scotia) when five people were killed from the Ochs and Roder families. The second raid was on 11 September and a child was killed on the Northwest Range. Mi'kmaq casualties are unrecorded, as are events leading up to the raids.
