= Charlotte Howe, Viscountess Howe =

Hanover-born British courtier and politician

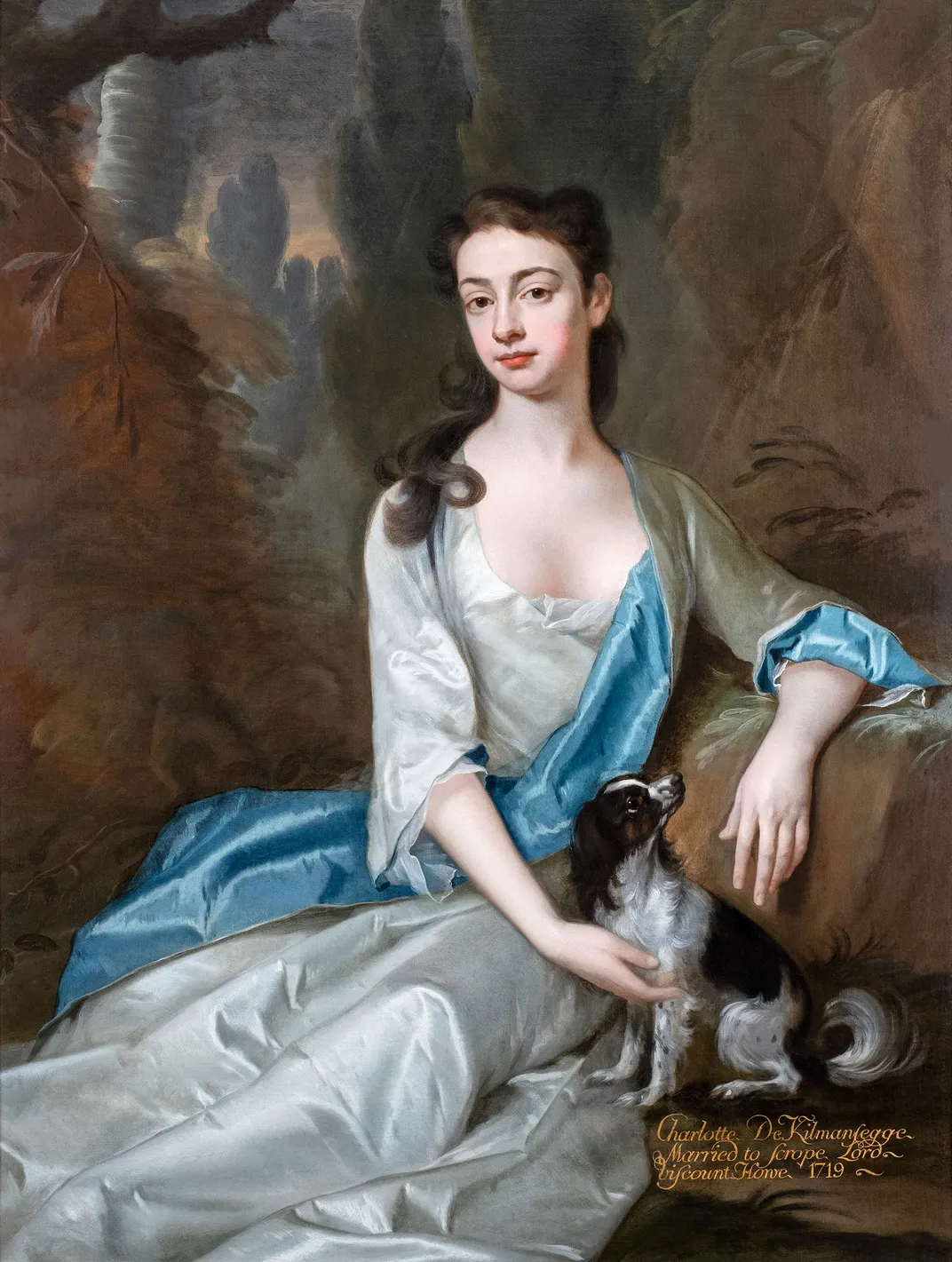
Portrait of Charlotte Howe, Viscountess Howe, attributed to Enoch Seeman, 1719

(Mary Sophia) Charlotte Howe, Viscountess Howe (23 September 1703 – 13 June 1782), was a Hanover-born British courtier and politician.

== Biography ==
Born Baroness Sophia Charlotte Mary (Note: The order of her baptismal names were later changed after her marriage.) von Kielmansegg (probably in Hanover), she was the eldest daughter of the Baron and Baroness von Kielmansegg (later Countess of Leinster and Darlington). The Baroness was a half-sister of George Louis, Elector of Hanover (the future George I of Great Britain).

It was popularly rumoured that the countess and her half-brother were lovers, and that her children were in fact his illegitimate offspring. When the elector became King of Great Britain in 1714, the von Kielmansegg family followed him to London.

On 8 August 1719, Charlotte married Emanuel Howe, 2nd Viscount Howe. The king gave the couple £750 per annum, which was later raised to £1250. The couple had ten children, including Hon. George Augustus Howe, Hon. Richard Howe and Hon. William Howe (successively Viscounts Howe). Charlotte was naturalised as a British citizen by Act of Parliament in 1722.

== Death ==
Lady Howe died in 1782 at her home in Albemarle Street and was buried at Langar.
