= Santa Quest =

- Directed by: P.J. Naworynski
- Written by: P.J. Naworynski
- Produced by: Edward Peill
- Starring: John Dunsworth
- Cinematography: Kyle Cameron
- Edited by: Sarah Byrne
- Production company: Tell Tale Productions Inc
- Distributed by: KinoSmith
- Release date: September 13, 2014 (Atlantic Film Festival)
- Running time: 87 minutes
- Country: Canada
- Language: English

Santa Quest is a 2014 pseudo-documentary film that follows Canadian actor John Dunsworth as he rekindles his faith in Santa Claus and represents Canada at the Santa Winter Games in Sweden in an attempt to become the world's best Santa Claus. The film was produced by Tell Tale Productions Inc had its world premiere at the Atlantic Film Festival in September 2014.

== Synopsis ==
Renowned Canadian actor John Dunsworth is a man on a mission. Famous for his portrayals of Jim Lahey on Trailer Park Boys, or Dave Teagues in the Haven (TV series), this year John is tackling one of the most challenging acting roles of his illustrious career – a character that represents the most famous brand on the planet. One whose image and likeness have been depicted and debauched in more films, TV series, and commercial endeavours than any other character --- ever.... Santa Claus.

Santa Quest is a feature documentary that follows John's journey to bring home the gold for Canada at the Santa Winter Games in Sweden. He knows the competition will be stiff and he only has six weeks to train so he enlists the help of various friends and experts to help him prepare. En route to Sweden he stops in Italy to visit the bones of St. Nicholas, then it's onto Vienna to visit a Christmas market, next stop Finland and the Santa Village, and finally the Santa Winter Games in Sweden. With barely any time to recover from the grueling competition he heads back home to start a 15 city North American tour with the Trailer Park Boys for their live Christmas show. John can't help but be entertaining but at times his journey is also deeply personal as he explores his faith, his relationship with his family, and his own personal achievements and failures.

== Cast ==
- John Dunsworth

== See also ==
- Santa Claus in film
