= Emanuel Howe =

Emanuel Howe may refer to:

- Emanuel Howe (British Army officer) (c. 1663 – 1709), English diplomat, army officer and Member of Parliament
- Emanuel Howe, 2nd Viscount Howe (1700–1735), British politician and Governor of Barbados
