= Ephraim Cooke =

English mariner, merchant, and shipbuilder who was in early settler in Nova Scotia

- Born: England
- Occupations: Mariner, shipbuilder

Ephraim Cooke was a mariner, merchant, and shipbuilder who was instrumental in establishing Halifax, Mushamush (present-day Mahone Bay), and Blockhouse, Nova Scotia. Originally from England, Cooke's life in Nova Scotia was marked with charges of fraud, embezzlement, abusive language, impersonating a justice, and insubordination, which had a major impact in shaping Halifax's early justice system.

== Biography ==
=== Halifax ===
In 1749, the Baltimore, under Cooke's command, was one of the first ships carrying European settlers to land in Halifax Harbor as part of Edward Cornwallis' expedition to establish the town of Halifax. Cooke decided to settle in town the same year and was immediately implicated in Halifax's first-ever civil case, just four months after the town itself was established. Michael Hendly, a former Baltimore crew member, was successful in suing Cooke for libel. He claimed that, after working on the voyage from London, Cooke required him to serve on a ship bound for Louisbourg, which he duly did. Cooke then commanded him onto another ship and he refused; he left shortly after, as "he could serve Cook[e] no longer." The nascent government ordered Cooke to return Hendly's belongings from the ship, pay his wages "from the day of shipping to the day of his dismissal", and cover the fixed court costs.

Like other early settlers, Cooke was critical of the men tasked with heading the justice system. Not long after the case with Hendley, another ship in the harbor drifted and hit the Baltimore, entangling the two vessels. When neither crew could get the ships unstuck, a more senior officer on Cooke's ship separated them with an ax. The owner of the other ship, Mr. Davis, approached the court to request damages from Cooke, who agreed to court proceedings until it was clear that things were not going to settle in his favor. When one of Davis' men brought Cooke the court order outlining the cost, he made it clear he had no intention of paying. When confronted by Cornwallis, he claimed that the unnamed owner of the Baltimore would only pay if he or the ship were seized. Infuriated by Cooke's insubordination and disrespect, Cornwallis issued a warrant preventing him from leaving the harbor until he paid the damages and wrote a note of apology. Cooke scrambled to obey so his warrant would not impact his crew from conducting his business as a merchant. A nearly identical situation happened in February 1750, again with Cooke on the losing end. Halifax's justice system was in part shaped out of necessity for handling Cooke's behavior.

Despite this, Cornwallis appointed him to the Commission of the Common Pleas and Inferior Courts, where he served as a Justice of Peace. There, he had a history of verbally abusing, threatening, and disrespecting other justices, culminating in a disagreement with Justice William Steele in 1752, wherein Steele alleged that Cooke had called him names and threatened him with a stick. Cooke did not show up to the first court date, claiming he was sick; the physician, however, personally notified the court that Cooke was okay to attend the second date. There, he claimed Steele owed him money, then resorted to name-calling when Steele produced a receipt. Unimpressed with his conduct, the court sent Cooke to jail. He spent his one night there writing an apology letter; when released the next morning, he promised to apologize to Steele the following Monday.

Cooke was left off the commission list following the conflict with Steele, but he maintained that his first appointment was still valid, effectively dismissing the legality of the court's authority. Though he was not himself particularly wealthy, he was still part of the bourgeoisie class and had friends in the upper echelons of society. Eventually, though, his desire to do as he pleased and his disrespect for the court caught up with him when he issued a warrant for fisherman John Grace, who had not yet gone to trial and thus was not required to be in prison. Cooke was sued for damages by Grace and prosecuted by the court for impersonating a justice. During his hearing, he verbally abused the officials and was thrown in jail. After deliberation about how to punish Cooke for being in contempt of court, they decided on a more lenient sentence and charged him a £20 fee with a £500 surety bond for a year of good behavior.

=== Mushamush ===
In 1753, Cooke reportedly sold off a large swath of his waterfront property and left whatever remained to his clerk, Stephen Janson. A creditor from London arrived the following year and, along with local creditors, "sued Cook[e] into oblivion." It is unclear whether he returned to England for a short period or whether he went straight to form a settlement at the mouth of the Mushamush River in what is now Mahone Bay, but he had settled and started building a block house in 1754.

In Halifax, Cooke had poured thousands of pounds into developing his lot and his life in Mushamush was no different. After the block house, he built a saw mill and two vessels, which he used to bring in cattle from Massachusetts. The first ship was the snow Edward. Patrick Sutherland at Fort Edward in nearby Lunenburg was given orders to provide Cooke with whatever he needed; as such, he was given a sloop and soldiers to protect him from the Indigenous Mi'kmaq, who were already living on the land. Further, Cooke was able to choose the commander of the troop and requested his old shipmate and acquaintance Captain Thomas Lewis. Cooke brought in Swiss, French, and English settlers to occupy the land and started a ship building company. This trade fully occupied the town, so much so that by the 1900s, Mahone Bay residents were supported almost entirely by the industry.

In 1755, Cooke's ship Edward was chartered to move Acadians out of Nova Scotia as part of the Great Deportation. Following the Raid on Lunenburg, he built another block house, this time in the present-day community of Blockhouse, to protect the Mushamush population.
