= Tell Tale Productions Inc =

Tell Tale Productions Inc.
- Company type: Privately held company
- Industry: Film and television production
- Founded: 2003
- Founder: Edward Peill
- Headquarters: Halifax, Nova Scotia, Canada
- Products: Documentary
- Website: www.telltale.tv

Tell Tale Productions Inc. is a media production company based in Halifax, Nova Scotia, Canada, specializing in one-off documentaries, factual entertainment series, and interactive media.

== Documentaries ==
- Forever Young (2015) broadcast on CBC Firsthand
- A TV Renaissance (2015) broadcast on CBC Doc Zone
- Santa Quest (2014)
- Bounty: Into The Hurricane (2014) broadcast on CBC Absolutely Maritimes
- Trek of the Titans (2014) broadcast on CBC The Nature of Things
- Bite Me: The Bed Bug Invasion (2013) broadcast on CBC Doc Zone
- Counterfeit Culture (2013) broadcast on CBC Doc Zone
- BorderLine (2012) broadcast on Super Channel (Canada)
- Our Lady (2012) broadcast on VisionTV
- Facebook Follies (2011) broadcast on CBC Doc Zone
- Web Warriors (2008) broadcast on CBC Doc Zone

== Television series ==
- The Curse of Oak Island (2014) broadcast on History (Canada)
- Maritime Vignettes (2009–2014) broadcast on CBC Land and Sea
  - "Halifax Underground" (2015)
  - "Ghost Towns" (2015)
  - "A Tale Of Two Moose" (2015)
  - "Growing Concern" (2015)
  - "Come From Away" (2015)
  - "Birds At Risk" (2014)
  - "Invasive Species" (2014)
  - "The Sinking of the Bounty " (2014)
  - "Lucky to be Alive" (2014)
  - "Oh Christmas Tree" (2013)
  - "Wild Food" (2013)
  - "Lighthouses" (2013)
  - "Nova Scotia Islands" (2013)
  - "Whale Rescue" (2013)
  - "Maritime Shipbuilding" (2012)
  - "Pirates and Privateers" (2012)
  - "Rum Running" (2012)
  - "The Last Sardine Outpost" (2012)
  - "Nova Scotia Schooners'" (2011)
  - "Algae: The Future of Fuel" (2011)
  - "Concordia: Tall Ship Down" (2010)
  - "Turning a Green Leaf" (2009)
- Code Green (2006) broadcast on CBC

== Mobile apps ==
- iMary (2012)

== Web series ==
- Tall Ship Odyssey (2015) on Discovery Canada
