= HMS Baltimore (1742) =

Sloop of the Royal Navy

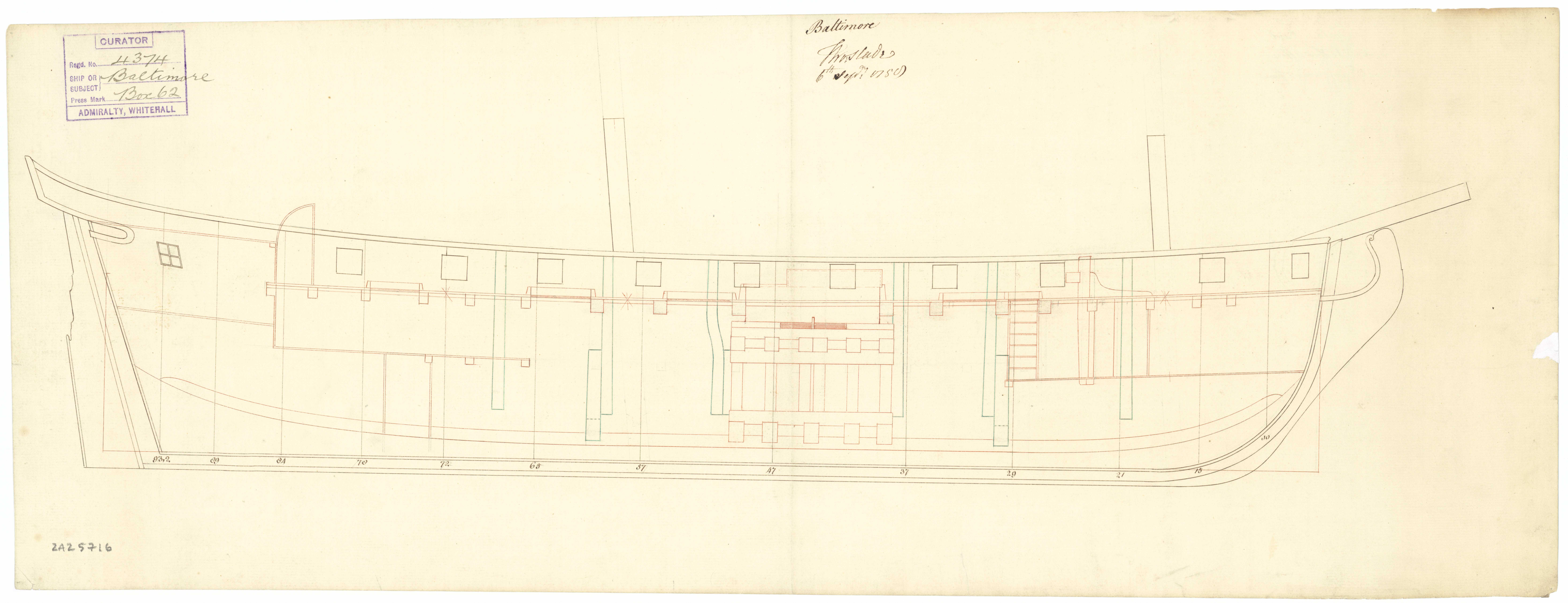
- 1758 conversion plan of Baltimore

History

Great Britain
- Name: Baltimore
- Builder: Deptford Dockyard
- Launched: 1742
- Fate: Sold 1762

General characteristics
- Propulsion: Sails
- Complement: 110
- Armament: 14 × 4-pounder guns

HMS Baltimore was a Royal Navy sloop-of-war launched in 1742, designed by and named after Lord Baltimore who at the time was a Lord of the Admiralty.

As launched, Baltimore had bilander rig, but in 1743 she was fitted with a conventional snow rig. Although her sides were pierced for 18 guns, she actually carried 14 four-pounders. In 1749, the vessel transported British settlers to Halifax, Nova Scotia under the command of Ephraim Cook (mariner).

In January 1758, she sailed from Yorktown, Virginia to Britain, carrying the colony's former governor, Robert Dinwiddie. Later that year she was converted to a bomb vessel.
