= George Howe, 3rd Viscount Howe =

British Army officer (1725–1758)

Brigadier-General The Right Honourable The Viscount Howe
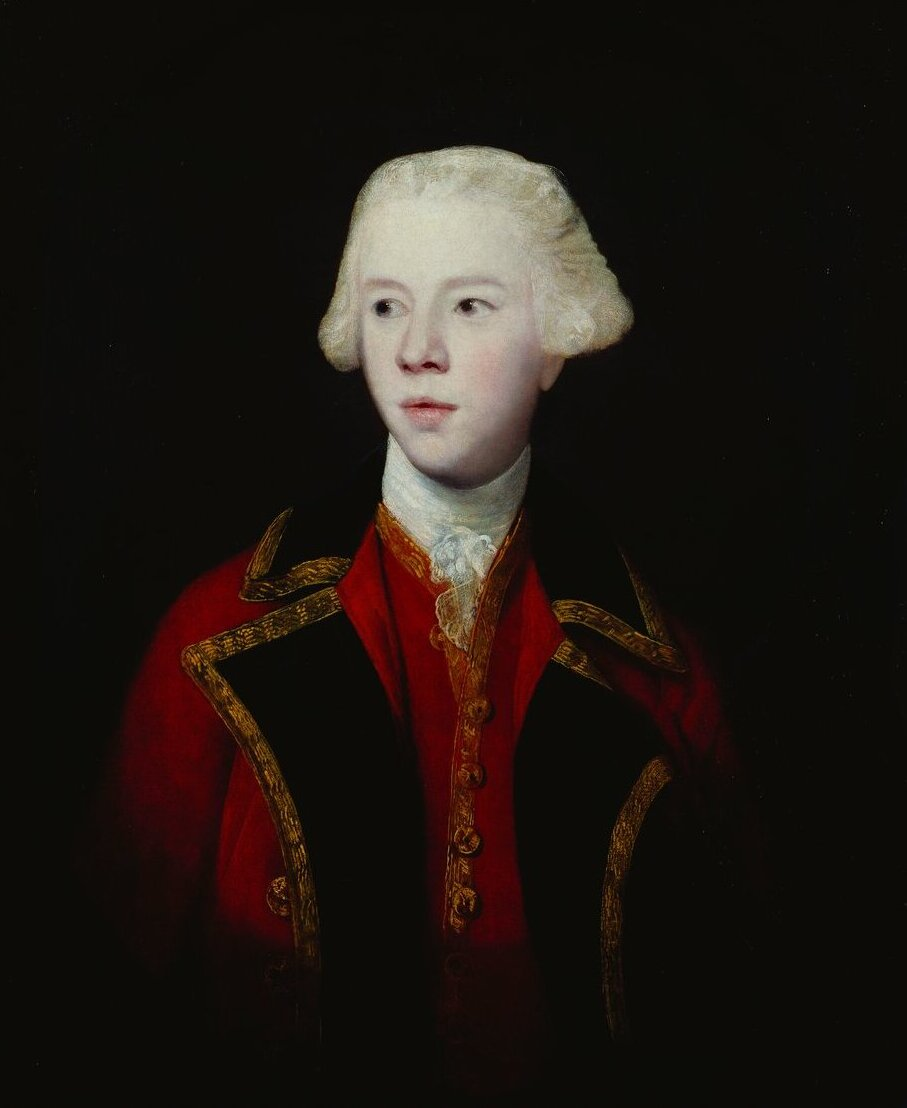
- Portrait by Sir Joshua Reynolds, c. 1750
- Born: c. 1725; London, England
- Died: 6 July 1758 (aged 32–33); Ticonderoga, New York
- Burial place: St. Peter's Episcopal Church, Albany
- Military career
- Allegiance: Great Britain
- Branch: British Army
- Service years: 1745–1758
- Rank: Brigadier general
- Unit: 1st Regiment of Foot Guards
- Commands: 60th Regiment of Foot; 55th Regiment of Foot
- Conflicts: War of the Austrian Succession; Battle of Lauffeld; French and Indian War; Battle of Bernetz Brook †

Brigadier-General George Augustus Howe, 3rd Viscount Howe (c. 1725 – 6 July 1758) was a British Army officer. He was described by James Wolfe as "the best officer in the British Army". Howe was killed in the French and Indian War in the Battle of Bernetz Brook the day before the Battle of Carillon.

== Background ==
Howe's father was Emanuel Howe, 2nd Viscount Howe, and his mother was Mary Sophia von Kielmansegg (a niece of King George I), and he had two notable younger brothers, Richard (who was later created Earl Howe) and William, as well as seven other siblings. George was born either on the Howe estate at Langar, Nottinghamshire, or at the Howe home on Albemarle Street, London.

== Early career ==
Howe joined the British Army as an ensign of the 1st Regiment of Foot Guards in 1745 and served in the War of the Austrian Succession. In 1746 he was made an aide-de-camp to Captain-general Prince William, Duke of Cumberland, the commander of the Pragmatic Army in Flanders. On 2 July 1747 Howe fought at the Battle of Laufeld, and he was promoted to lieutenant colonel in 1749 following the end of the war in 1748.

== Ticonderoga campaign reforms ==
In 1758, in preparation for the attack on the French fort at Ticonderoga, which controlled access from Lake George to Lake Champlain, Lord Howe set about reforming General James Abercrombie's army for warfare in North America. He used his own 55th Regiment as an example for the rest of the army to follow. Howe had uniforms cut short, so that they came just to the men's waists, and all lace was removed from the coats as well. The cumbersome tricorn hats worn by the soldiers were cut down to brims of 2.5 inches (6.4 cm), resembling derby hats. Infantrymen were issued leggings made of wool, in place of their linen and hemp canvas gaiters. Excess uniforms and equipment were done away with. The men's hair was cut short, Dr. Richard Huck wrote; "we are an army of round heads." Officers were not immune to his changes either, and he made himself an example of this, cutting his hair short. He washed his own clothes, and took very little baggage into the field.

His changes did not only affect the uniforms of the army but its tactics as well. In the fall of 1757, Lord Howe had accompanied the famous ranger Major Robert Rogers on a scouting expedition. In the spring he again met with Rogers to discuss warfare and tactics in the North American theater. He began instructing the troops in Abercrombie's army in the manner of marching, forming, and fighting in the woods. One observer stated that Lord Howe had trained his 55th Regiment so well that they were as "dexterious as rangers."

Many historians have credited Lord Howe with the creation of light infantry, and have called the 55th Regiment a light infantry regiment, however that was not the case. While Lord Loudoun contemplated creating light infantry companies in each redcoat battalion, the idea was scrapped when Colonel Thomas Gage proposed to raise a regiment of Light Armed Foot, that became Gage's 80th Regiment. They wore brown uniforms, instead of red and were the first British light infantry regiment. At the Siege of Louisbourg, General Jeffery Amherst ordered his regiments to create light infantry companies. Those companies were then placed into a light infantry battalion under the command of Colonel George Scott of the 40th Regiment. The following year, as Commander-in-chief in North America, Amherst ordered each regiment in North America to create a light infantry company.

== Seven Years' War ==
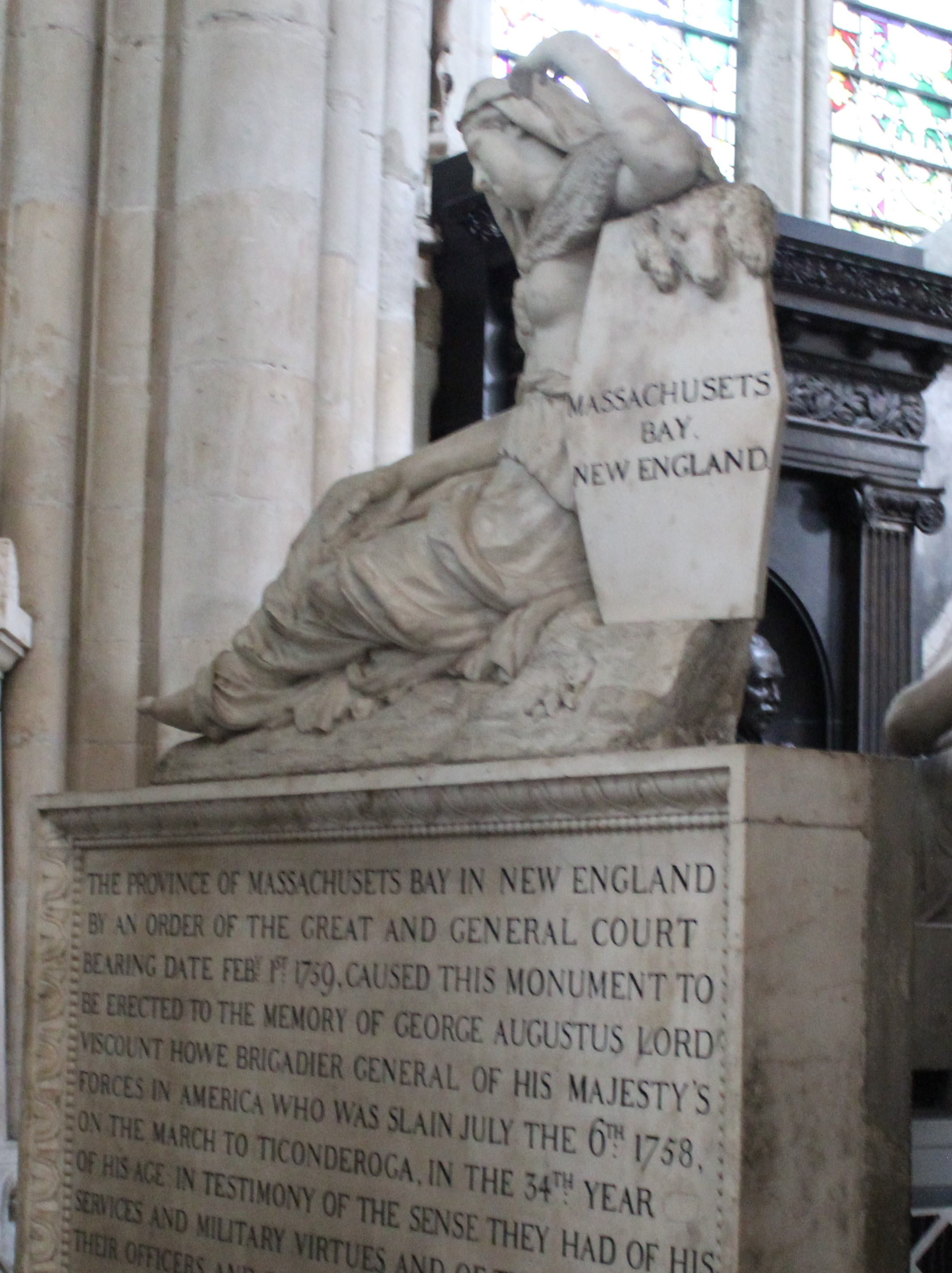
Howe's memorial in Westminster Abbey

On 2 February 1757 Howe was appointed colonel of the 60th (Royal American) Regiment of Foot and commanding officer of the regiment's third battalion. He transferred his colonelcy to the 55th Regiment of Foot on 28 September while in Halifax, Nova Scotia. In December Howe was promoted to brigadier general. In 1758 he and his regiment were part of Major-general James Abercrombie's expedition against French-held Fort Carillon which culminated in the Battle of Carillon. British Prime Minister William Pitt the Elder had wanted Howe in command of the expedition rather than Abercrombie, but the latter had more political influence and seniority and so the former was made the expedition's second-in-command.

On 6 July Abercrombie's army marched northwards from the shore of Lake George in four columns. Howe led one of these columns, with the 55th Foot being accompanied by a force of Connecticut Militia under Major Israel Putnam, with Putnam serving as a scout and guide. They made contact with a French detachment that had been separated from the main force and the Battle of Bernetz Brook ensued. Howe's troops fought well, inflicting casualties of 150 killed or wounded and a further 150 captured on the French troops and Indian warriors they fought against. However, Howe was shot through the chest at the beginning of the battle and died falling into Putnam's arms.

== Aftermath ==
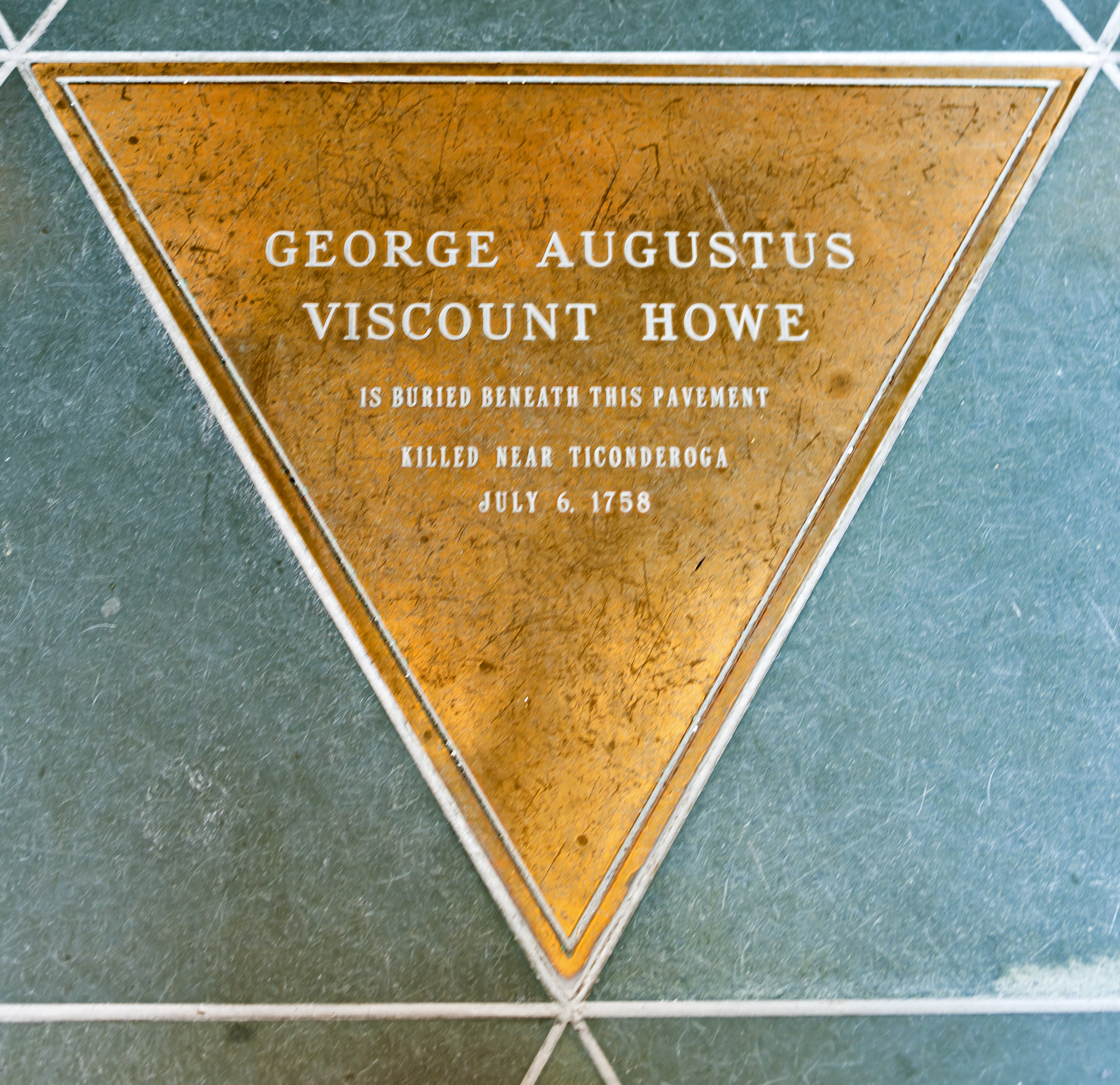
Howe's burial marker in St. Peter's Episcopal Church, Albany, New York. It is the only burial marker for a British peer in the U.S.

Howe was widely mourned on both sides of the Atlantic. The Massachusetts Assembly (or general court) later voted £250 to place a monument in Westminster Abbey by the sculptor Peter Scheemakers, which was erected in 1759.

== Genealogy ==
George was brother to Admiral Richard Howe, 4th Viscount Howe and 1st Earl Howe, and Sir William Howe, 5th Viscount Howe. The Family of Hoge quotes The Encyclopædia Britannica as having this to say about the Howes:

The friendliness of the brothers, Admiral Richard Howe and General William Howe, to the colonies led to their selection for the command of the British forces in the Revolutionary War. It was thought that they could negotiate a settlement with the American forces.

== Bibliography ==
- Stoetzel, Donald I. Encyclopedia of the French & Indian War in North America, 1754–1763. Heritage Books, 2008.

Parliament of Great Britain
Preceded by John Plumptre; Sir Charles Sedley	Member of Parliament for Nottingham; 1747–1758; With: Sir Charles Sedley 1747–1754; Sir Willougby Aston 1754–1758	Succeeded by Sir Willougby Aston; William Howe
Military offices
Preceded by Charles Perry	Colonel of the 55th Regiment of Foot; 1757–1758	Succeeded by John Prideaux
Peerage of Ireland
Preceded by Emanuel Howe	Viscount Howe; 1735–1758	Succeeded by Richard Howe
Preceded by Emanuel Howe	Baron Glenawley; 1735–1758	Succeeded by Richard Howe
Baronetage of England
Preceded by Emanuel Howe	Baronet of Compton; 1735–1758	Succeeded by Richard Howe
