= Sophia von Kielmansegg, Countess of Darlington =

German-born courtier

The Right Honourable The Countess of Darlington
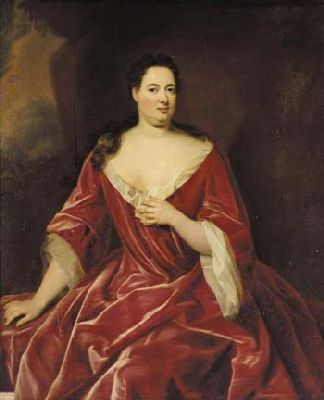
- Portrait by Sir Godfrey Kneller, 1st Baronet.
- Other titles: Countess of Leinster; Baroness of Brentford
- Born: Countess Sophia Charlotte of Platen-Hallermund; 10 April 1675; Osnaburg
- Died: 20 April 1725 (aged 50); London
- Spouse: Baron Johann Adolph von Kielmansegg
- Issue: Count Georg Ludwig von Kielmansegg; Charlotte Howe, Viscountess Howe
- Father: Ernest Augustus, Elector of Hanover
- Mother: Clara Elisabeth von Meisenbuch-Züschen

Sophia Charlotte von Kielmansegg, Countess of Darlington and Countess of Leinster (1675–1725) was a German noblewoman. A half-sister of George I of Great Britain, to whom she was close, she moved to England in 1714 shortly after the Hanoverian succession, where she became an influential figure of his court.

== Background ==
She was the daughter of Clara Elisabeth von Meisenbuch, married to Franz Ernst, Count von Platen-Hallermund, a court official, but mistress of Ernest Augustus, Elector of Brunswick-Lüneburg, married to Sophia of the Palatine who was in the line of succession of the kingdoms of England and Scotland. At the court of Ernest Augustus, her status was as an illegitimate daughter of the Elector, who was the father of George Louis, Elector of Hanover from 1698 and the future British king, with whom she shared a close loyalty and abiding friendship. In 1701 she married Baron Johann Adolph von Kielmansegg (1668–1717), with whom she had two children: Georg Ludwig (1705–1785) and Maria Sophia Charlotte (1703–1782), who married Emanuel Howe, 2nd Viscount Howe and had issue.

== In England ==
At the London court of George I, Sophia von Kielmansegg vied with Melusine von der Schulenburg, Duchess of Kendal, George's mistress. Her title Countess of Darlington in the Peerage of Great Britain, with the subsidiary title of Baroness of Brentford, was given by the king in 1722, following a title of Countess of Leinster in the Peerage of Ireland in 1721. Her blood relationship to George I was not well known in Britain, and it was widely assumed that she, like the Duchess of Kendal, was the King's mistress. On one occasion, a confectioner in the royal household was dismissed after being caught using "indecent expressions concerning the King & Madam Kielmansegg". Her access to the king meant her favour was sought with many gifts, particularly around the South Sea Bubble. She died at home in London on 20 April 1725.

== Description ==
Gaining the nickname "the Elephant and Castle” after her arrival in England in 1714, she is said to have been a very large woman.

Horace Walpole says of her:

I remember, as a boy, being terrified at her enormous figure. The fierce black eyes, large and rolling, beneath two lofty arched eyebrows, two acres of cheeks spread with crimson, an ocean of neck that overflowed and was not distinguished from the lower part of her body, and no part restrained by stays

— Horace Walpole
