= Howe baronets of Compton (1660) =

Extinct baronetcy in the Baronetage of England

Howe baronets
- Escutcheon of the Howe baronets of Compton
- Creation date: 1660
- Status: extinct
- Extinction date: 1814

The Howe baronetcy, of Compton in the County of Gloucester, was created in the Baronetage of England on 22 September 1660 for John Howe, Member of Parliament for Gloucestershire in 1654–1655 and 1656–1658. His elder son Richard, the second baronet, was also an MP, as was his younger son John Grobham Howe (died 1679). Sir Richard Grobham Howe, the third baronet, was MP for Tamworth, Cirencester and Wiltshire. Sir Emanuel Howe, 4th Baronet, became the 2nd Viscount Howe on the death of his father in 1713 and the baronetcy which he inherited in 1730 was merged with his viscountcy.

== Howe baronets, of Compton (1660) ==
- Sir John Howe, 1st Baronet (died c.1671)
- Sir Richard Grobham Howe, 2nd Baronet (28 August 1621 – 3 May 1703)
- Sir Richard Grobham Howe, 3rd Baronet (c. 1652 – 3 July 1730)
- Sir Emanuel Scrope Howe, 2nd Viscount Howe, 4th Baronet (c. 1700 – 29 March 1735)

The baronetcy merged with the Howe viscountcy in 1730 (see Viscount Howe). Both became extinct in 1814.

== Title succession chart ==
Title succession chart of the: Howe baronets, Barons Glenawley, Barons Chedworth, Barons Howe, Barons Curzon, Viscounts Curzon, Viscounts Howe, and Earls Howe

John Howe
Howe baronets of Compton, 1660
John Howe d. 1671; 1st Baronet	George Howe d. 1647
Howe baronets of Cold Barwick
Richard Howe; 1621–1703; 2nd Baronet	John Grobham Howe; 1625–1679	George Howe c. 1627–1676; 1st Baronet
Baron Glenawley, Viscount Howe (Ire), 1701
Richard Howe c. 1651–1730; 3rd Baronet	Scrope Howe; 1648–1713; 1st Viscount Howe	John Grubham Howe; 1657–1722	Charles Howe; 1661–1742	Emanuel Howe c. 1663–1709	James Howe c. 1669–1736; 2nd Baronet
Baronetcy extinct
Baron Chedworth
John Howe died young	Emanuel Howe c. 1700–1735; 2nd Viscount Howe, 4th Baronet	John Howe d. 1742; 1st Baron Chedworth	Three sons who died young	Three sons without male issue
Baron Curzon, 1794; Viscount Curzon, 1802	Viscount Howe (GB), 1782; Earl Howe (GB) and Baron Howe, 1788
Assheton Curzon; 1730–1820; 1st Viscount Curzon, 1st Baron Curzon	George Howe c. 1725–1758; 3rd Viscount Howe, 5th Baronet	Richard Howe; 1726–1799; Earl Howe, Viscount Howe (GB), 4th Viscount Howe (Ire), 1st Baron Howe, 6th Baronet	William Howe; 1729–1814; 5th Viscount Howe (Ire), 5th Baron Glenawley, 7th Baronet	John Howe; 1714–1762; 2nd Baron Chedworth	Henry Howe; 1716–1781; 3rd Baron Chedworth	Thomas Howe d. 1776
Earldom Howe and viscountcy Howe (GB) extinct, 1799	Viscountcy Howe (Ire), barony Howe, and baronetcy Howe of Compton extinct, 1814
Penn Curzon; 1757–1797	Sophia (Howe) Waller; 1762–1835; 2nd Baroness Howe	John Howe; 1754–1804; 4th Baron Chedworth
Barony extinct, 1804
Earl Howe (UK, 1821)
George Howe; 1788–1805	Leicester Howe; 1792–1793	Richard Curzon-Howe; 1796–1870; 1st Earl Howe, 2nd Viscount Curzon, 2nd Baron Curzon, 3rd Baron Howe
George Curzon-Howe; 1821–1876; 2nd Earl Howe	Richard Curzon-Howe; 1822–1900; 3rd Earl Howe
Richard Curzon; 1861–1929; 4th Earl Howe	Frederick Curzon; 1868–1920
Francis Curzon; 1884–1964; 5th Earl Howe	George Curzon; 1898–1976
Edward Curzon; 1908–1984; 6th Earl Howe	Frederick Curzon b. 1951; 7th Earl Howe
Thomas Curzon b. 1994 styled Viscount Curzon

== See also ==
- Howe baronets
