= Baron Chedworth =

Barony in the Peerage of Great Britain

The coat of arms of the Barons Chedworth.

Lord Chedworth, Baron of Chedworth, in the County of Gloucester, was a title in the Peerage of Great Britain. It was created on 12 May 1741 for John Howe, who had earlier represented Wiltshire in Parliament. In 1736 he had succeeded to the estates of his cousin Sir Richard Howe, 3rd Baronet (see Howe baronets and below). He was succeeded in the barony by his eldest son, John, the second Baron. He served as Lord-Lieutenant of Gloucestershire. He was childless and on his death in 1762 the title passed to his younger brother, Henry, the third Baron. He was unmarried and was succeeded by his nephew, John, the fourth Baron. He was the eldest surviving son of Reverend the Honourable Thomas Howe, younger son of the first Baron. He never married and the title became extinct on his death in 1804.

The first Baron was the son of John Grobham Howe, Paymaster of the Forces, son of John Grobham Howe, younger son of Sir George Howe, 1st Baronet (see Howe baronets). Emanuel Howe and Scrope Howe, 1st Viscount Howe, were his uncles.

== Barons Chedworth (1741) ==
- John Howe, 1st Baron Chedworth (d. 1742)
- John Thynne Howe, 2nd Baron Chedworth (1714–1762)
- Henry Frederick Howe, 3rd Baron Chedworth (1715–1781)
- John Howe, 4th Baron Chedworth (1754–1804)

== Title succession chart ==
Title succession chart, Howe baronets, Barons Glenawley, Barons Chedworth, Barons Howe, Barons Curzon, Viscounts Curzon, Viscounts Howe, and Earls Howe.

John Howe
Howe baronets of Compton
Sir John Howe; 1st Baronet died 1671	George Howe died 1647
Howe baronets of Cold Barwick
Sir Richard Howe; 2nd Baronet; 1621–1703	John Grobham Howe; 1625–1679	Sir George Howe; 1st Baronet c. 1627 – 1676
Baron Glenawley; Viscount Howe (Ire, 1701)
Sir Richard Howe; 3rd Baronet c. 1651 – 1730	Scrope Howe; 1st Viscount Howe; 1648–1713	John Grubham Howe; 1657–1722	Charles Howe; 1661–1742	Lt.Gen. Emanuel Howe c. 1663 – 1709	Sir James Howe; 2nd Baronet c. 1669 – 1736
Baronetcy extinct
Baron Chedworth
John Howe died young	Emanuel Howe; 2nd Viscount Howe; 4th Baronet c. 1700 – 1735	John Howe; 1st Baron Chedworth died 1742	Three sons who died young	Three sons without male issue
Viscount Howe (GB, 1782)
Baron Curzon; Viscount Curzon	Baron Howe; Earl Howe (GB, 1788)
Assheton Curzon; 1st Viscount Curzon; 1st Baron Curzon; 1730–1820	George Howe; 3rd Viscount Howe; 5th Baronet c. 1725 – 1758	Richard Howe; 1st Earl Howe; 4th Viscount Howe; 1st Baron Howe; 1726–1799	William Howe; 5th Viscount Howe; 5th Baron Glenawley; 7th Baronet; 1729–1814	John Howe; 2nd Baron Chedworth; 1714–1762	Henry Howe; 3rd Baron Chedworth; 1716–1781	Hon. Thomas Howe died 1776
Earldom and GB viscountcy extinct	Viscountcy, barony and baronetcy extinct
Hon. Penn Curzon; 1757–1797	Sophia Waller; 2nd Baroness Howe (née Howe); 1762–1835	John Howe; 4th Baron Chedworth; 1754–1804
Barony extinct
Earl Howe (UK, 1821)
George Howe; 1788–1805	Leicester Howe; 1792–1793	Richard Curzon-Howe; 1st Earl Howe; 2nd Viscount Curzon; 2nd Baron Curzon; 3rd Baron Howe; 1796–1870
George Curzon-Howe; 2nd Earl Howe; 1821–1876	Richard Curzon-Howe; 3rd Earl Howe; 1822–1900
Richard Curzon; 4th Earl Howe; 1861–1929	Hon. Frederick Curzon; 1868–1920
Francis Curzon; 5th Earl Howe; 1884–1964	Cdr. George Curzon; 1898–1976
Edward Curzon; 6th Earl Howe; 1908–1984	Frederick Curzon; 7th Earl Howe born 1951
Thomas Curzon; Viscount Curzon born 1994

== See also ==
- Howe baronets
- Earl Howe
