= Earl Howe =

Earldom in the Peerage of Great Britain

- Arms: Quarterly: 1st and 4th, Or, a Fess between three Wolves' Heads couped Sable (Howe); 2nd & 3rd, Argent, on a Bend Sable, three Popinjays Or, collared Gules (Curzon). Crests: 1st, Out of a Ducal Coronet Or, a Plume of five Ostrich Feathers Azure (Howe); 2nd, A Popinjay wings displayed and inverted Or, collarge Gules (Curzon). Supporters: On either side a Cornish Chough proper, chained around the neck Or.
- Creation date: 15 July 1821
- Creation: Second
- Created by: King George IV
- Peerage: Peerage of the United Kingdom
- First holder: Richard Curzon-Howe, 2nd Viscount Curzon
- Present holder: Frederick Curzon, 7th Earl Howe
- Heir apparent: Thomas Curzon, Viscount Curzon
- Subsidiary titles: Viscount Curzon; Baron Howe; Baron Curzon
- Motto: LET CURZON HOLDE WHAT CURZON HELDE

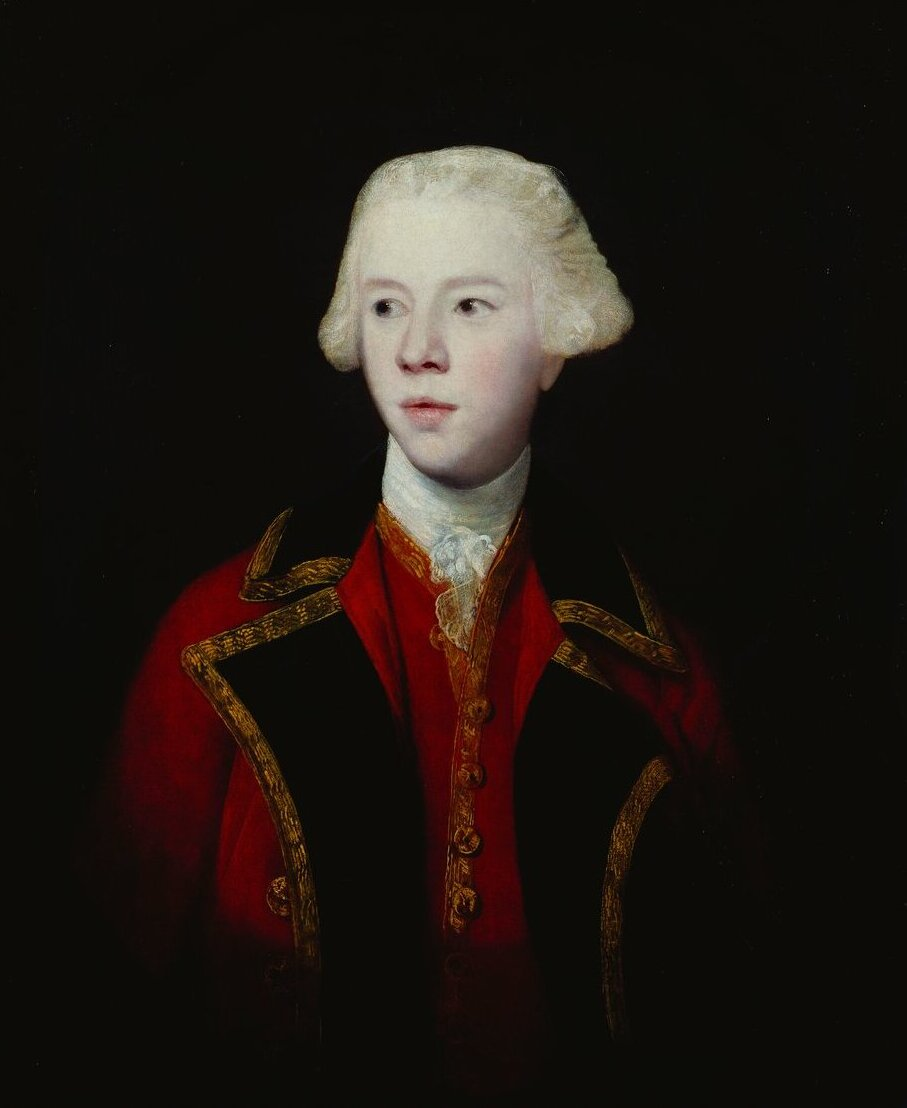
George Howe, 3rd Viscount Howe

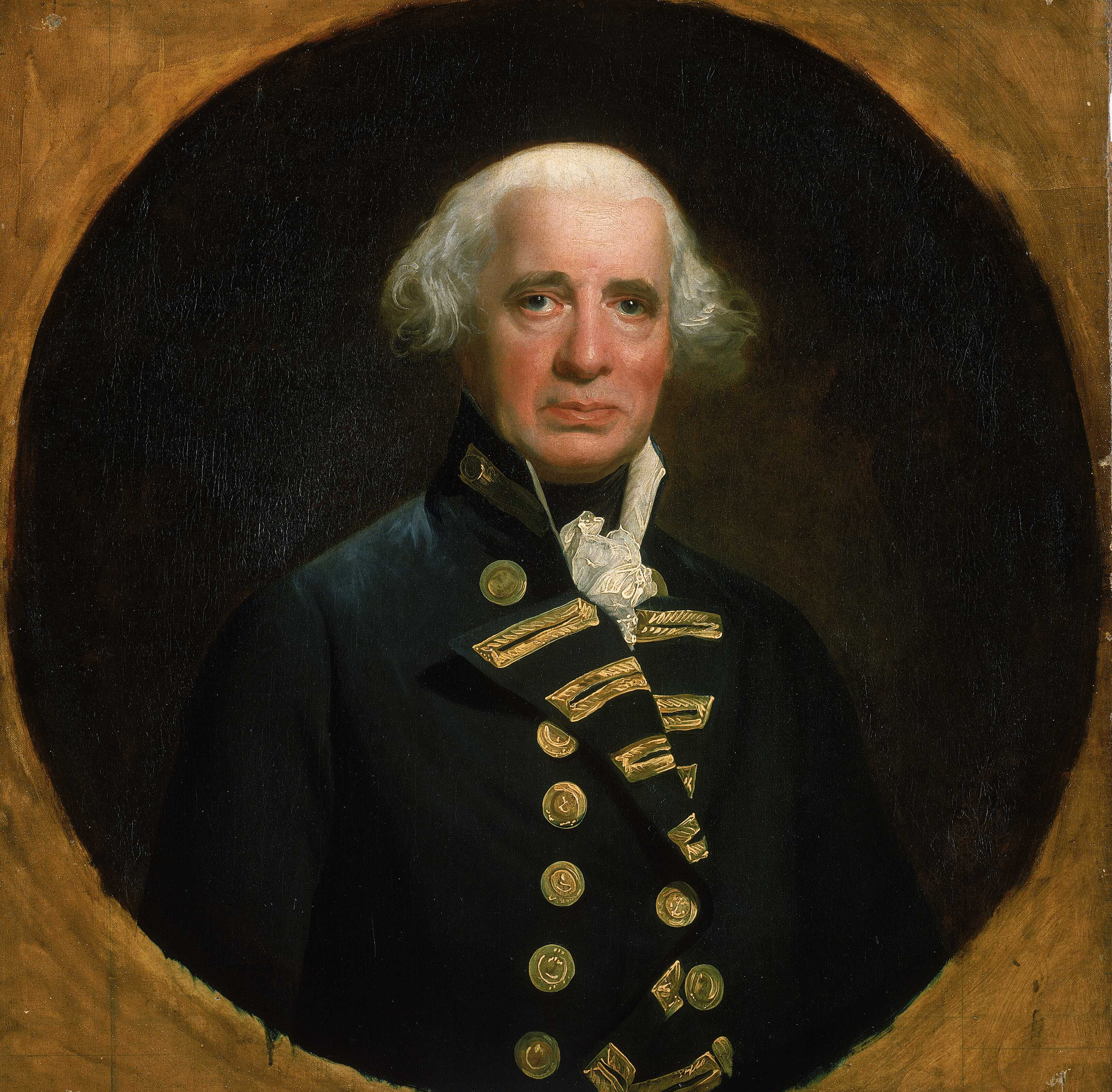
Richard Howe, Earl Howe

Earl Howe is a title that has been created twice in British history, for members of the Howe and Curzon-Howe family respectively. The first creation, in the Peerage of Great Britain, was in 1788 for Richard Howe, 4th Viscount Howe, but it became extinct upon his death in 1799. The second creation, in the Peerage of the United Kingdom, was in 1821 for Richard Curzon-Howe, 2nd Viscount Curzon, and it remains extant.

== History ==
=== First creation (1788) ===
The Howe family descended from John Grobman Howe, of Langar, Nottinghamshire. He married Annabella, illegitimate daughter of Emanuel Scrope, 1st Earl of Sunderland. Their son, Scrope Howe, sat as a Knight of the Shire for Nottinghamshire. In 1701 he was raised to the Peerage of Ireland as Baron Glenawley and Viscount Howe. His son Emanuel, the second viscount, also represented Nottinghamshire in the House of Commons and served as Governor of Barbados. Emanuel married Charlotte, Baroness von Kielmansegg, niece of George I via his illegitimate half-sister. The third, fourth and fifth viscounts were all sons of Emanuel and Charlotte. The third, George, was a brigadier of the British Army, killed at the Battle of Fort Carillon in 1758.

George was succeeded by his younger brother Richard, a distinguished naval commander best known for his victory of the Glorious First of June in 1794. In 1782 Richard was created Viscount Howe, of Langar in the County of Nottingham, in the Peerage of Great Britain, which entitled him to a seat in the British House of Lords. In 1788 he was made Baron Howe, of Langar in the County of Nottingham, with remainder to his daughters and the heirs male of their bodies, and Earl Howe, with normal remainder to heirs male of his body, also in the Peerage of Great Britain. Richard had no male issue, and on his death in 1799 the viscountcy of 1782 and earldom became extinct. He was succeeded in the barony of Howe according to the special remainder by his eldest daughter, Sophia Charlotte (see below). The Irish titles passed to his younger brother, William, the fifth Viscount, a noted soldier who served as Commander-in-Chief of the Forces in North America during the American Revolutionary War. William had no surviving issue and on his death in 1814 the barony of Glenawley and the Irish viscounty of Howe became extinct.

Howe baronets of Compton (1660) & Viscounts and Earl Howe (1st creation)

=== Second creation (1821) ===
The aforementioned Lady Sophia, who succeeded her father as second Baroness Howe in 1799, married the Hon. Penn Curzon, Member of Parliament for Clitheroe. He was the only son of Assheton Curzon, second son of Sir Nathaniel Curzon, 4th Baronet, of Kedleston (ancestor of George Curzon, 1st Marquess Curzon of Kedleston, and the Barons and Viscounts Scarsdale; see Viscount Scarsdale for earlier history of the family). Assheton Curzon represented Clitheroe in the House of Commons for twenty-seven years. In 1794 he was raised to the Peerage of Great Britain as Baron Curzon, of Penn in the County of Buckingham, and in 1802 he was further honoured when he was made Viscount Curzon, of Penn in the County of Buckingham, in the Peerage of the United Kingdom. Lord Curzon was succeeded by his grandson, the second Viscount. He was the only son of Penn Curzon and Lady Howe. In 1821 he assumed by Royal licence the additional surname of Howe and the same year the earldom held by his maternal grandfather was revived when he was created Earl Howe in the Peerage of the United Kingdom. In 1835 he also succeeded his mother as third Baron Howe. He was succeeded by his eldest son, the second Earl. He sat as Conservative Member of Parliament for Leicestershire South.

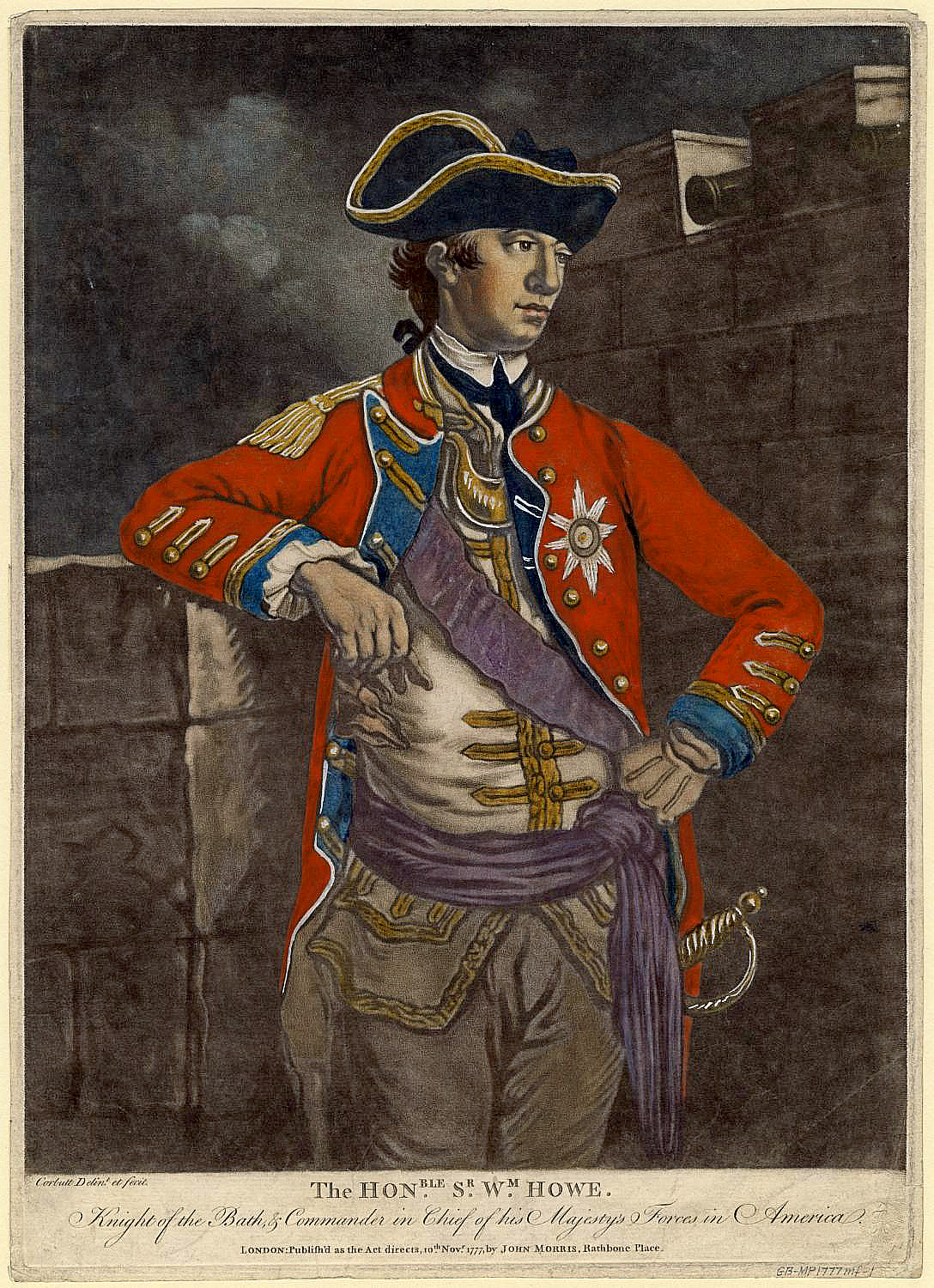
William Howe, 5th Viscount Howe

He died without male issue and was succeeded by his younger brother, the third Earl, who was a General in the British Army. His eldest son, the fourth Earl, was a Conservative politician and held minor office in the Conservative administration of 1895 to 1905. On his death in 1929 the title passed to his eldest son, the fifth Earl. He was a Conservative Member of Parliament and also involved in the world of motor racing. His only son, the sixth Earl, had four daughters but no sons and on his death in 1984 the line of the fourth Earl failed. The late Earl was succeeded by his second cousin, Frederick Curzon, the seventh Earl. He is the only son of the actor George Curzon, son of the Hon. Frederick Graham Curzon-Howe, second son of the third Earl. Lord Howe held office from 1991 to 1997 in the Conservative administrations of John Major and from 2015 to 2024 was Deputy Leader of the House of Lords and Minister of State for Defence. He is now Shadow Deputy Leader as one of the ninety elected hereditary peers that remain in the House of Lords after the passing of the House of Lords Act 1999. As a descendant of Sir Nathaniel Curzon, 4th Baronet, of Kedleston, he is also in remainder to this baronetcy, which is held by his kinsman the Viscount Scarsdale.

Several other members of the Curzon-Howe family have also gained distinction. The Hon. Frederick Howe (1823–1881), third son of the first Earl, was a captain in the Royal Navy. The Hon. Ernest George Howe (1828–1885), sixth son of the first Earl, was a Colonel in the British Army. The Hon. Sir Leicester Smyth (1829–1891) (who assumed the surname of Smyth in 1866), seventh son of the first Earl, was a General in the British Army and served as Governor of Gibraltar. The Hon. Montagu Curzon (1846–1907), eighth son of the first Earl (and eldest from his second marriage), was a Colonel in the Rifle Brigade and Member of Parliament. The Hon. Sir Assheton Curzon-Howe, ninth son and youngest child of the first Earl, was a naval commander and served as Commander-in-Chief of the Mediterranean Fleet from 1908 to 1910. His eldest son Leicester Charles Assheton St John Curzon-Howe (1894–1941) was a Captain in the Royal Navy. Lady Mary Anna Curzon-Howe, only daughter from the second marriage of the first Earl, married James Hamilton, 2nd Duke of Abercorn. Their granddaughter Lady Cynthia Hamilton married Albert Spencer, 7th Earl Spencer, and was the grandmother of Diana, Princess of Wales. The aforementioned George Curzon, son of the Hon. Frederick Graham Curzon-Howe, second son of the third Earl, was an actor.

The family seat is Penn House, Penn Street, Buckinghamshire.

== Earl Howe, first creation ==
=== Viscount Howe (1701) ===
- Scrope Howe, 1st Viscount Howe (1648–1713)
- Emanuel Scrope Howe, 2nd Viscount Howe (c. 1700 – 1735)
- George Augustus Howe, 3rd Viscount Howe (c. 1725 – 1758)
- Richard Howe, 4th Viscount Howe (1726–1799) (created Baron Howe and Earl Howe in 1788)

=== Earl Howe (1788) ===
- Richard Howe, Earl Howe (1726–1799)

=== Viscount Howe (1701; reverted) ===
- William Howe, 5th Viscount Howe (1729–1814)

== Earl Howe, second creation ==
Arms of the Earls Howe

=== Baron Howe (1788) ===
- Richard Howe, 1st Baron Howe (1726–1799)
- Sophia Charlotte Waller, 2nd Baroness Howe (1762–1835)
- Richard William Penn Curzon-Howe, 1st Earl Howe, 2nd Viscount Curzon, and 3rd Baron Howe (1796–1870) (had already been created Earl Howe in 1821; see below)

=== Viscount Curzon (1802) ===
- Assheton Curzon, 1st Viscount Curzon (1730–1820)
  - Hon. Penn Assheton Curzon (1757–1797)
- Richard William Penn Curzon-Howe, 2nd Viscount Curzon (1796–1870) (created Earl Howe in 1821)

=== Earl Howe (1821) ===
- Richard William Penn Curzon-Howe, 1st Earl Howe (1796–1870)
- George Augustus Frederick Louis Curzon-Howe, 2nd Earl Howe (1821–1876)
- Richard William Penn Curzon-Howe, 3rd Earl Howe (1822–1900)
- Richard George Penn Curzon, 4th Earl Howe (1861–1929)
- Francis Richard Henry Penn Curzon, 5th Earl Howe (1884–1964)
- Edward Richard Assheton Penn Curzon, 6th Earl Howe (1908–1984)
- Frederick Richard Penn Curzon, 7th Earl Howe (born 1951)

The heir apparent is the present holder's only son, Thomas Edward Penn Curzon, Viscount Curzon (born 1994).

== Succession ==
=== Title succession chart ===
Title succession chart of the: Howe baronets, Barons Glenawley, Barons Chedworth, Barons Howe, Barons Curzon, Viscounts Curzon, Viscounts Howe, and Earls Howe

John Howe
Howe baronets of Compton, 1660
John Howe d. 1671; 1st Baronet	George Howe d. 1647
Howe baronets of Cold Barwick, 1660
Richard Howe; 1621–1703; 2nd Baronet	John Grobham Howe; 1625–1679	George Howe c. 1627–1676; 1st Baronet
Baron Glenawley, Viscount Howe (Ire), 1701
Richard Howe c. 1651–1730; 3rd Baronet	Scrope Howe; 1648–1713; 1st Viscount Howe	John Grubham Howe; 1657–1722	Charles Howe; 1661–1742	Emanuel Howe c. 1663–1709	James Howe c. 1669–1736; 2nd Baronet
Baronetcy extinct
Baron Chedworth
John Howe died young	Emanuel Howe c. 1700–1735; 2nd Viscount Howe, 4th Baronet	John Howe d. 1742; 1st Baron Chedworth	Three sons who died young	Three sons without male issue
Baron Curzon, 1794; Viscount Curzon, 1802	Viscount Howe (GB), 1782; Earl Howe (1st creation, GB) and Baron Howe, 1788
Assheton Curzon; 1730–1820; 1st Viscount Curzon, etc.	George Howe c. 1725–1758; 3rd Viscount Howe, 5th Baronet	Richard Howe; 1726–1799; Earl Howe, etc., 4th Viscount Howe (Ire), 1st Baron Howe, 6th Baronet	William Howe; 1729–1814; 5th Viscount Howe (Ire), 5th Baron Glenawley, 7th Baronet	John Howe; 1714–1762; 2nd Baron Chedworth	Henry Howe; 1716–1781; 3rd Baron Chedworth	Thomas Howe d. 1776
Earldom Howe and viscountcy Howe (GB) extinct, 1799	Viscountcy Howe (Ire), barony Howe, and baronetcy Howe of Compton extinct, 1814
Penn Curzon; 1757–1797	Sophia (Howe) Waller; 1762–1835; 2nd Baroness Howe	John Howe; 1754–1804; 4th Baron Chedworth
Barony extinct, 1804
Earl Howe (2nd creation, UK), 1821
George Howe; 1788–1805	Leicester Howe; 1792–1793	Richard Curzon-Howe; 1796–1870; 1st Earl Howe, 2nd Viscount Curzon, etc., 3rd Baron Howe
George Curzon-Howe; 1821–1876; 2nd Earl Howe, 3rd Viscount Curzon, etc.	Richard Curzon-Howe; 1822–1900; 3rd Earl Howe, 4th Viscount Curzon, etc.
Richard Curzon; 1861–1929; 4th Earl Howe, 5th Viscount Curzon, etc.	Frederick Curzon; 1868–1920
Francis Curzon; 1884–1964; 5th Earl Howe, 6th Viscount Curzon, etc.	George Curzon; 1898–1976
Edward Curzon; 1908–1984; 6th Earl Howe, 7th Viscount Curzon, etc.	Frederick Curzon b. 1951; 7th Earl Howe, 8th Viscount Curzon, etc.
Thomas Curzon b. 1994 styled Viscount Curzon

=== Line of succession ===
Line of succession
- Assheton Curzon, 1st Viscount Curzon (1729/30–1820)
  - Hon. Penn Assheton Curzon (1757–1797)
    - Richard William Penn Curzon-Howe, 1st Earl Howe (1796–1870)
      - George Augustus Frederick Louis Curzon-Howe, 2nd Earl Howe (1821–1876)
      - Gen. Richard William Penn Curzon-Howe, 3rd Earl Howe (1822–1900)
        - Richard George Penn Curzon, 4th Earl Howe (1861–1929)
          - Francis Richard Henry Penn Curzon, 5th Earl Howe (1884–1964)
            - Edward Richard Assheton Penn Curzon, 6th Earl Howe (1908–1984)
        - Hon. Frederick Graham Curzon (1868–1920)
          - Cdr. (Chambré) George William Penn Curzon (1898–1976)
            - Frederick Richard Penn Curzon, 7th Earl Howe (born 1951)
              - (1) Thomas Edward Penn Curzon, Viscount Curzon (born 1994)
      - Col. Hon. Ernest George Curzon (1828–1885)
        - Maj. Ernest Charles Penn Curzon (1856–1938)
          - Charles Ernest Basset Lothian Curzon (1885–1952)
            - Capt. James Quintin Penn Curzon (1923–1985)
              - (2) Charles Mark Penn Curzon (born 1967)
      - Adm. Hon. Sir Assheton Gore Curzon-Howe (1850–1911)
        - Lt-Col. Assheton Penn Curzon-Howe-Herrick (1898–1959)
          - (3) Assheton Montagu Windsor Curzon-Howe-Herrick (born 1939)

== See also ==
- Howe baronets
- Viscount Scarsdale
- Baron Ravensdale
- Baron Chedworth
