= John Gore (Royal Navy officer, born 1772) =

Royal Navy officer

Admiral Sir John Gore KCB
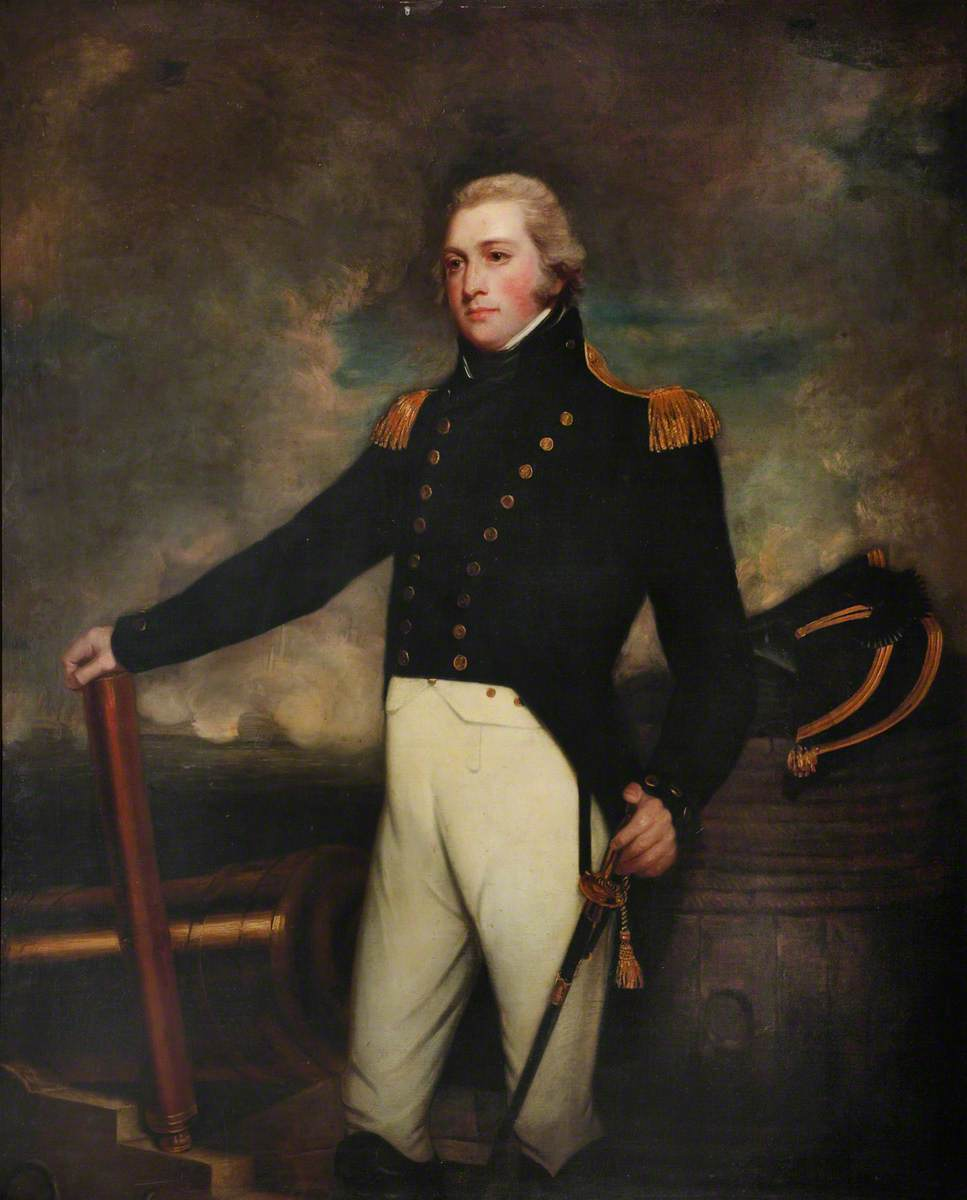
- Portrait of Gore
- Born: 9 February 1772; County Kilkenny, Ireland
- Died: 21 August 1836 (aged 64); Datchet, Buckinghamshire
- Military career
- Allegiance: Great Britain; United Kingdom
- Branch: Royal Navy
- Service years: 1781–1836
- Rank: Admiral
- Units: HMS Fleche; HMS Triton; HMS Medusa
- Commands: East Indies and China Station; Nore Command
- Conflicts: French Revolutionary Wars; Napoleonic Wars
- Awards: Order of the Bath

Admiral Sir John Gore (9 February 1772 – 21 August 1836) was a Royal Navy officer who served in the French Revolutionary and Napoleonic Wars.

== Early life ==
Gore was born on 9 February 1772 in County Kilkenny, Ireland. His father was Col. John Gore, the Lieutenant-Governor of the Tower of London in 1776.

== Naval career ==
Gore joined the Royal Navy in August 1781, as a captain's servant, and would have served as a midshipman, before gaining promotion to lieutenant on 26 November 1789 and commander on 24 May 1794. The Royal Navy had just captured the French corvette Flèche at the capture of Bastia, in which Gore had played a significant role and had been injured. The British took the corvette into service as HMS Fleche and commissioned her under Gore. He fitted her out and sailed her to Malta where he negotiated with the Grand Master of the Knights Hospitaller Emmanuel de Rohan-Polduc for seamen, supplies, and the like. On 13 September Gore was a witness at the trial of Lieutenant William Walker, commander of the hired armed cutter Rose, on charges that Walker had accepted money from merchants at Bastia to convoy their vessels to Leghorn, where the court martial took place. Walker was acquitted.

Gore received promotion to post captain on 14 November 1794. When in command of HMS Triton, he took part in the successful Action of 16 October 1799, in which two Spanish frigates were captured and more than 2 million silver dollars taken. While commanding the 32-gun frigate HMS Medusa, he took part in the action of 5 October 1804. Promoted to rear-admiral on 4 December 1813, he became Commander-in-Chief, The Nore, from 1818 to 1821. Promoted to vice-admiral on 27 May 1825, he served as Commander-in-Chief, East Indies and China Station, from 1831 to 1834.

== Personal life ==
On 15 August 1808, at St George's, Hanover Square, he married Georgiana Montagu (1786–1854), daughter of Admiral Sir George Montagu and Charlotte Wroughton. The couple had four children:

- Georgiana Gore (1810–1877), who married Gen. Charles Stuart, son of Capt. John James Stuart (a son of Gen. Sir Charles Stuart) and Albinia Sullivan, in 1839.
- John Gore (c. 1812–1835), a Lieutenant in the Royal Navy who drowned while attempting to save a seaman in the East Indies.
- Anne Gore (1817–1877), who married, as his second wife, Richard Curzon-Howe, 1st Earl Howe, son of Hon. Penn Assheton Curzon (eldest son of the 1st Viscount Curzon) and Sophia Charlotte Howe, suo jure Baroness Howe of Langar, in 1845.
- Maria Gore (1819–1902), who married Maj. Hon. Henry Littleton Powys-Keck, son of Thomas Powys, 2nd Baron Lilford and Henrietta Maria Atherton, in 1862.

Sir John died on 21 August 1836 at Datchet, Buckinghamshire. Lady Gore died in Wilcot in 1854.

== Legacy ==
Through his daughter Anne, he was a grandfather of Col. Hon. Montagu Curzon, Lady Mary Anna Curzon (wife of James Hamilton, 2nd Duke of Abercorn), and Adm. Sir Assheton Gore Curzon-Howe, who served as Commander-in-Chief of the Mediterranean Fleet from 1908 to 1910.

His surviving portrait, which is in the collection of the National Maritime Museum, Greenwich, has been attributed to the artist John Westbrooke Chandler.

== See also ==
- European and American voyages of scientific exploration

Military offices
Preceded by Sir Charles Rowley	Commander-in-Chief, The Nore; 1818–1821	Succeeded by Sir Benjamin Hallowell
New post	Commander-in-Chief, East Indies and China Station; 1831–1834	Succeeded by Sir Thomas Capel
