= Richard Curzon-Howe =

Richard Curzon-Howe may refer to:

- Richard Curzon-Howe, 1st Earl Howe
- Richard Curzon-Howe, 3rd Earl Howe
- Richard Curzon, 4th Earl Howe

== See also ==
- Richard Howe (disambiguation)
- Richard Curzon (disambiguation)
