= Richard Curzon =

Richard Curzon may refer to:

- Richard Curzon, 4th Earl Howe (1861–1929), British courtier and politician
- Richard Curzon-Howe, 1st Earl Howe (1796–1870), British peer and courtier
- Richard Curzon-Howe, 3rd Earl Howe (1822–1900), British peer and soldier
- Richard Curzon, 2nd Viscount Scarsdale (1898–1977), English peer and landowner

== See also ==
- Richard Curzon-Howe (disambiguation)
