= Robert Hyde (1650–1722) =

English politician

Robert Hyde (10 October 1650 – 1722) of Hindon, Wiltshire and Heale, Woodford, Wiltshire, was an English politician who sat in the English House of Commons between 1677 and 1707 and in the British House of Commons from 1708 to 1722.

Hyde was the second (and eldest surviving) son of Alexander Hyde, who was Bishop of Salisbury from 1665 to 1667, and his wife Mary Townson, daughter of Robert Townson, who was Bishop of Salisbury from 1620 to 1621. He succeeded to the estates of his uncle Sir Robert Hyde in 1665 and to his father's in 1667. He matriculated at Magdalen Hall, Oxford, in 1666 and was admitted at the Middle Temple in 1667. In 1673 he was called to the bar.

He married Lady Finetta Pope, daughter of Thomas Pope, 3rd Earl of Downe, on 4 May 1674. She died on 16 October 1700 and Hyde married again to Arundell Penruddock, daughter of Thomas Penruddock, MP of Compton Chamberlayne, Wiltshire, on 26 January 1704.

Hyde was returned as a Member of Parliament (MP) for Hindon in 1677 and sat until 1679. He was returned as MP again in 1685 and in succeeding general elections until 1698. He was returned as MP for Wiltshire in 1702 and again in the general elections of 1708, 1710, 1713, 1715 and 1722 when he was too infirm to attend the poll.

Hyde died on 20 April 1722.

Parliament of England
Preceded by Sir George Howe; Edward Seymour	Member of Parliament for Hindon; 1677–1679; With: Edward Seymour	Succeeded by Richard Howe; Thomas Lambert
Preceded by John Thynne; Sir Richard Howe	Member of Parliament for Hindon; 1685–1698; With: Thomas Lambert 1685–1689; John Milner 1689–1690; Thomas Chafin 1690–1691; The Viscount Fitzhardinge 1691–1695; Sir Charles Morley 1695–1697; Colonel Henry Lee 1697–1698	Succeeded by Reynolds Calthorpe; Sir James Howe
Parliament of Great Britain
Preceded by Maurice Ashley; William Ashe	Member of Parliament for Wiltshire; 1702–1722; With: Richard Howe	Succeeded by Richard Howe; Richard Goddard
