= Richard Grobham Howe =

Richard Grobham Howe may refer to:

- Sir Richard Grobham Howe, 2nd Baronet (1621–1703)
- Sir Richard Grobham Howe, 3rd Baronet (c.1651–1730)
