= Richard Howe (disambiguation) =

Richard Howe, 1st Earl Howe (1726–1799), was a British naval officer and earl.

Richard Howe may also refer to:

- Sir Richard Howe, 2nd Baronet (1621–1703), English politician
- Sir Richard Howe, 3rd Baronet (c. 1651 – 1730), English politician
- (Richard Edward) Geoffrey Howe (1926–2015), British Conservative politician
- Dick Howe (1912–1981), recipient of the Military Cross
- Richard C. Howe (1924–2021), former Utah Supreme Court Justice
- Richard Howe (cricketer) (1853–1914), English cricketer

== See also ==
- Richard Curzon-Howe (disambiguation)
