= Baron Curzon =

Baron Curzon can refer to:

- Baron Curzon of Penn, an 18th-century title in the peerage of Great Britain
- Baron Curzon of Kedleston, a 19th-century title in the peerage of Ireland
