= Henry Howe, 3rd Baron Chedworth =

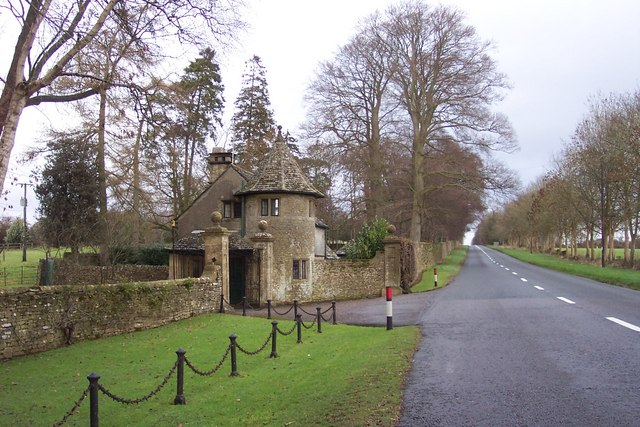
- Stowell Park entrance lodge
- Born: 17 February 1716; Gloucestershire
- Died: 7 October 1781 (aged 65); Gloucestershire

Henry Frederick Howe, 3rd Baron Chedworth (17 February 1716 – 7 October 1781), was the second son of John Howe, 1st Baron Chedworth.

== Education ==
He was educated at John Roysse's Free School in Abingdon (now Abingdon School). He later studied at Pembroke College, Oxford (Gen.Com.).

== Peerage ==
He succeeded to the title in 1762 on the death of his brother and did not marry.

The family seat was Stowell Park, Gloucestershire, and he was succeeded in the barony by his nephew John Howe, 4th Baron Chedworth.

== Career ==
He was admitted to Lincoln's Inn on 1 August 1732. His occupation in 1777 was listed as surgeon. He died on 7 October 1781.

== See also ==
- List of Old Abingdonians

Peerage of Great Britain
Preceded by John Howe	Baron Chedworth; 1762–1781	Succeeded by John Howe
