= Howe baronets =

There have been two baronetcies created for persons with the surname Howe, both in the Baronetage of England and both extinct.

- Howe baronets of Cold Barwick (1660)
- Howe baronets of Compton (1660)
