= Emanuel Howe, 2nd Viscount Howe =

British politician and colonial administrator

Emanuel Scrope Howe, 2nd Viscount Howe (c. 1700 – 29 March 1735), of Langar Hall, Nottinghamshire, was a British politician and colonial administrator.

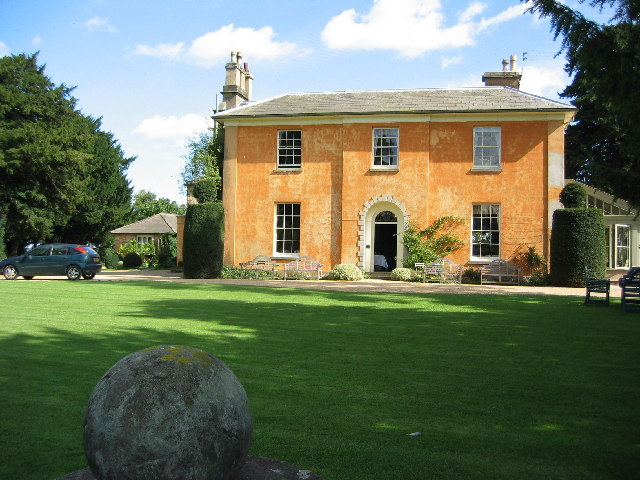
Langar Hall, Nottinghamshire

== Life ==
His father was Scrope Howe, a Whig Member of Parliament from whom he inherited the viscountcy and the Langar estate in 1713. In 1730 he inherited the Howe baronetcy, which merged with the viscountcy.

He was elected Member of Parliament for Nottinghamshire, in 1722. By 1732 he had encountered financial difficulties and the Duke of Newcastle suggested he resign his seat and take up the governorship of the West Indian colony of Barbados which was worth around £7,000 a year. He accepted the duke's advice and from 1733 served as governor of Barbados until dying there of disease in 1735.

== Family ==
In 1719 he married Mary Sophia Charlotte von Kielmansegg, daughter of Johann Adolf von Kielmansegg and Sophia von Kielmansegg, Countess of Darlington, illegitimate daughter of Ernest Augustus, Elector of Brunswick-Lüneburg, and his mistress Clara Elisabeth von Platen. In March 1720, her naturalisation as a British subject was approved by the House of Lords.

Emanuel Howe is probably best known as the father of four sons, three of whom served in the British military and the fourth as a ship's commander. The eldest George Howe, was an innovative army officer, killed at the opening of the Battle of Carillon in 1758. Richard Howe joined the navy, and rose to be an Admiral. William Howe became noted for his part in the capture of Quebec in 1759 and became a prominent soldier. During 1776–1778 his sons William and Richard commanded, respectively, the British army and naval forces in North America during the American War of Independence. They simultaneously served as peace commissioners to the Second Continental Congress. Richard Howe later won greater fame on the Glorious First of June in 1794. Thomas Howe commanded ships for the East India Company and made observations on Madeira and the hitherto little known Comoro Islands.

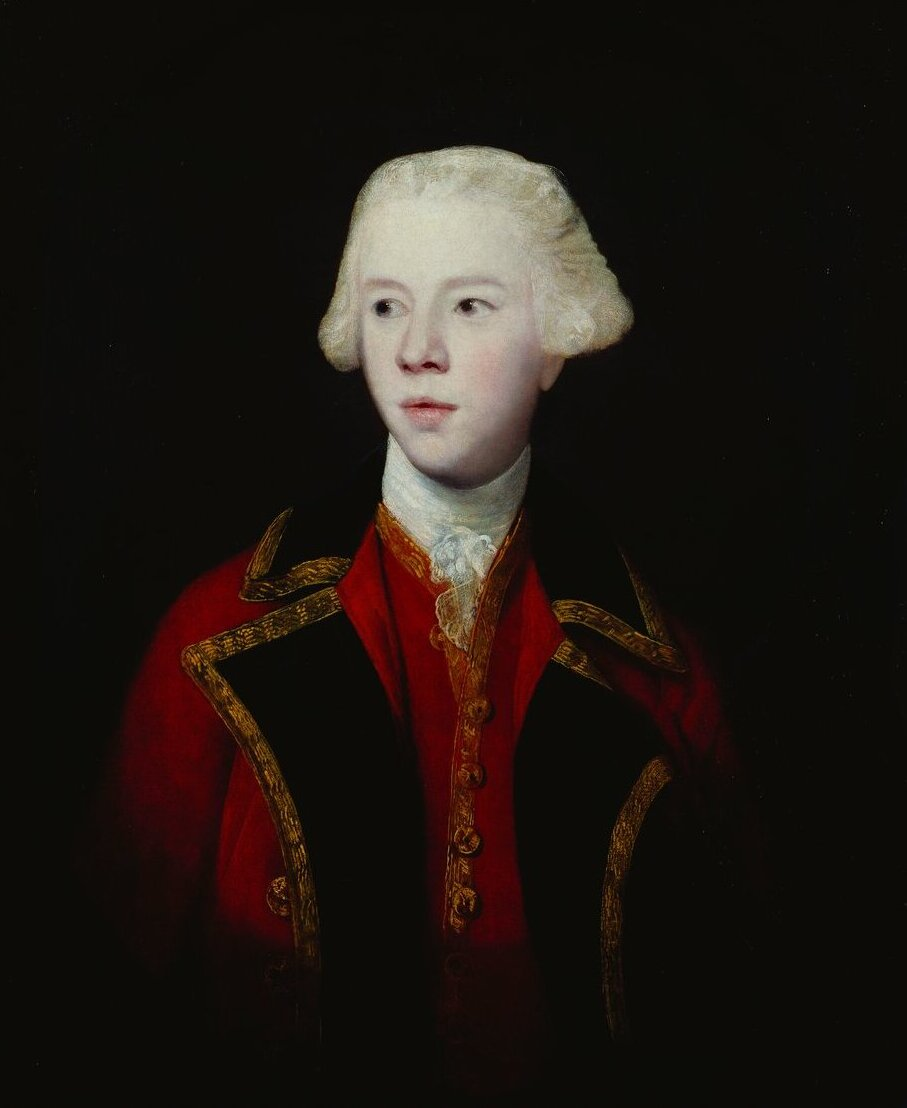
George Howe, 3rd Viscount Howe

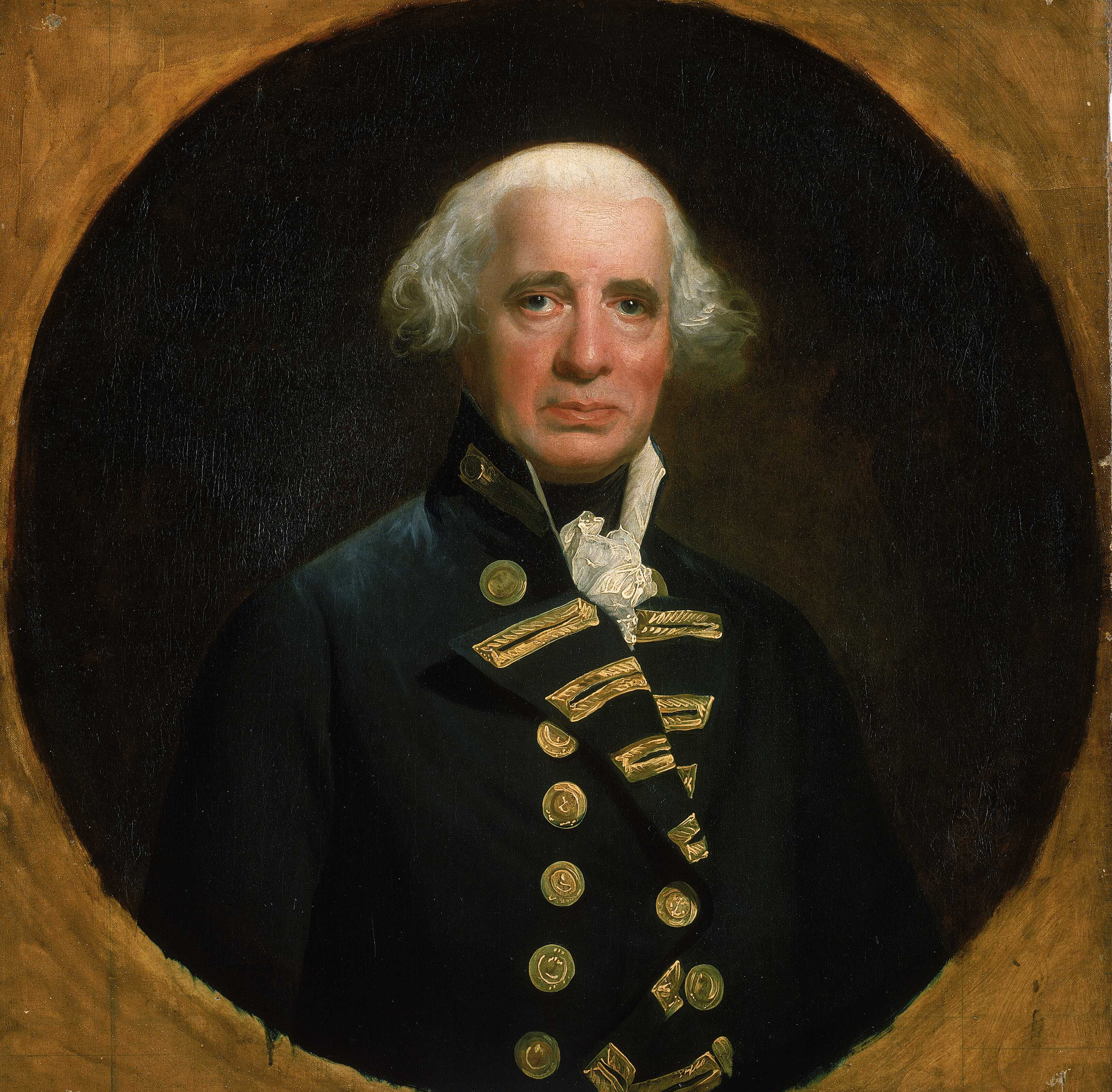
Richard Howe, Earl Howe

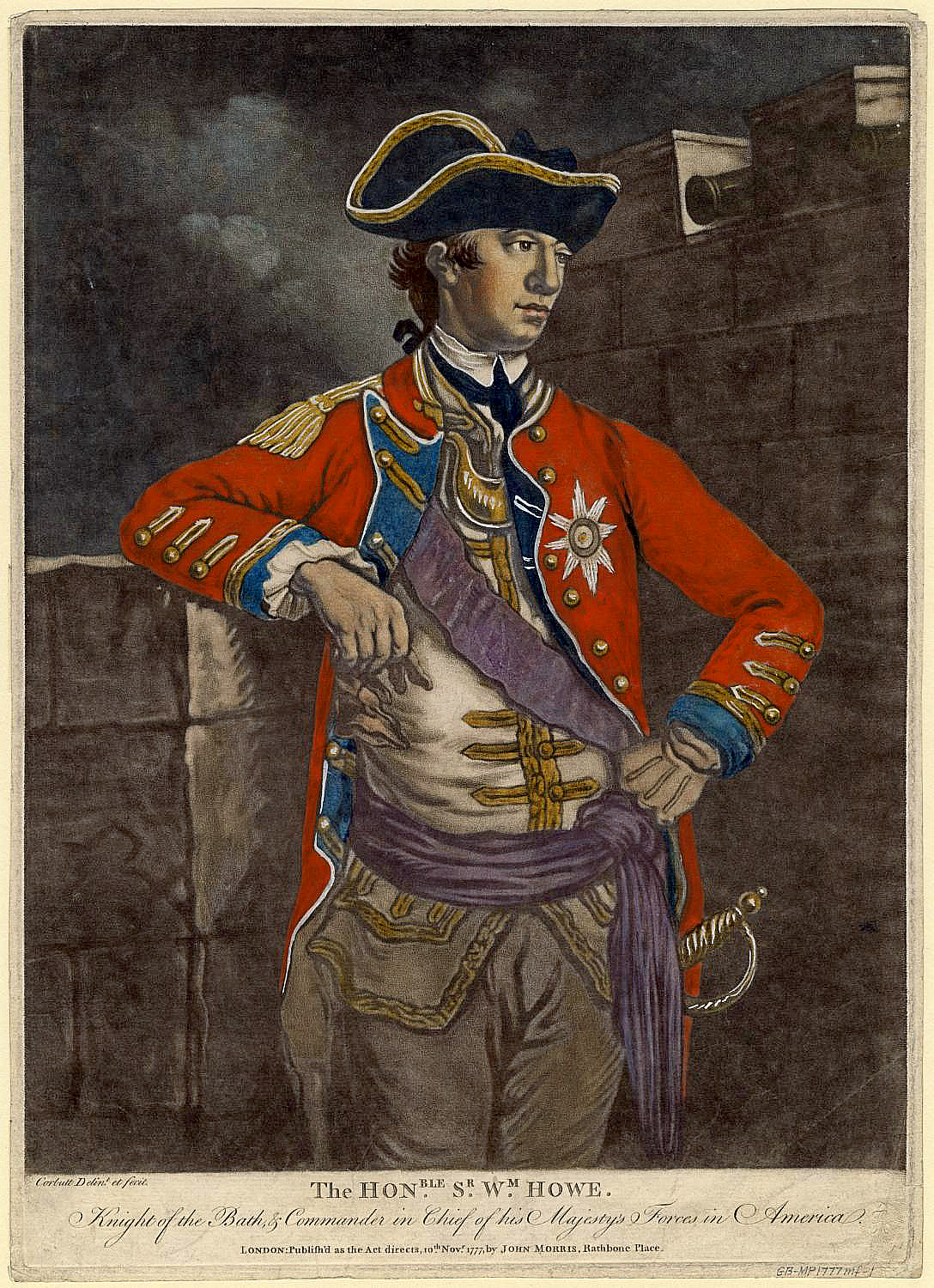
William Howe, 5th Viscount Howe

== Bibliography ==
- Syrett, David. Admiral Lord Howe: A Biography. Spellmount, 2006.

Parliament of Great Britain
Preceded by Hon. Francis Willoughby; William Levinz	Member of Parliament for Nottinghamshire; 1722–1732; With: Sir Robert Sutton	Succeeded by Thomas Bennet; William Levinz
Peerage of Ireland
Preceded by Scrope Howe	Viscount Howe; 1713–1735	Succeeded by George Howe
Preceded by Scrope Howe	Baron Glenawley; 1713–1735	Succeeded by George Howe
Baronetage of England
Preceded by Richard Howe	Baronet of Compton; 1730–1735	Succeeded by George Howe
