= John Howe, 2nd Baron Chedworth =

English peer

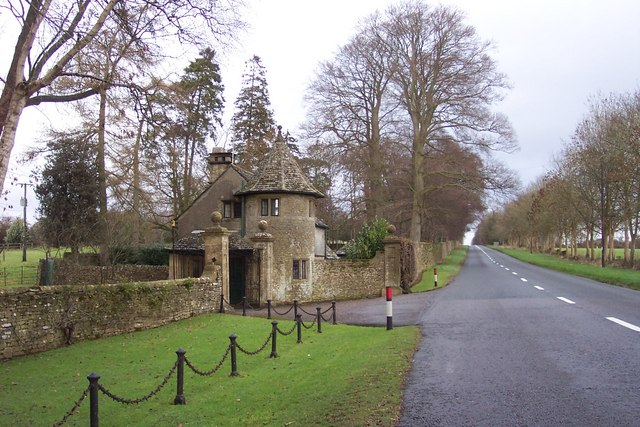
- Stowell Park entrance lodge
- Born: 18 February 1714
- Died: 9 May 1762 (aged 48)

John Thynne Howe, 2nd Baron Chedworth (18 February 1714 – 9 May 1762), was an English peer and the eldest son of John Howe, 1st Baron Chedworth.

== Education ==
He was educated at John Roysse's Free School in Abingdon, (now Abingdon School). He later studied at Pembroke College, Oxford.

== Peerage ==
He succeeded to the title in 1742 on the death of his father, and married on 23 September 1751, Martha Parker-a-Morley-Long, daughter of Sir Philip Parker-a-Morley-Long, 3rd Baronet of Erwarton, Suffolk.

The family seat was Stowell Park, Gloucestershire, and his London residence was 25 Leicester Square.

There were no children from his marriage and he was succeeded in the barony by his younger brother Henry Howe, 3rd Baron Chedworth.

== Career ==
He was the Lord Lieutenant of Gloucestershire and Constable of St.Briavel's (1758).

He was a breeder of thoroughbred racehorses.

== See also ==
- List of Old Abingdonians

Honorary titles
| Preceded by The Lord Ducie | Lord Lieutenant of Gloucestershire; 1758–1762 | Succeeded by Norborne Berkeley |
Peerage of the United Kingdom
| Preceded by John Howe | Baron Chedworth; 1742–1762 | Succeeded by Henry Howe |
