= John Howe, 4th Baron Chedworth =

English aristocrat

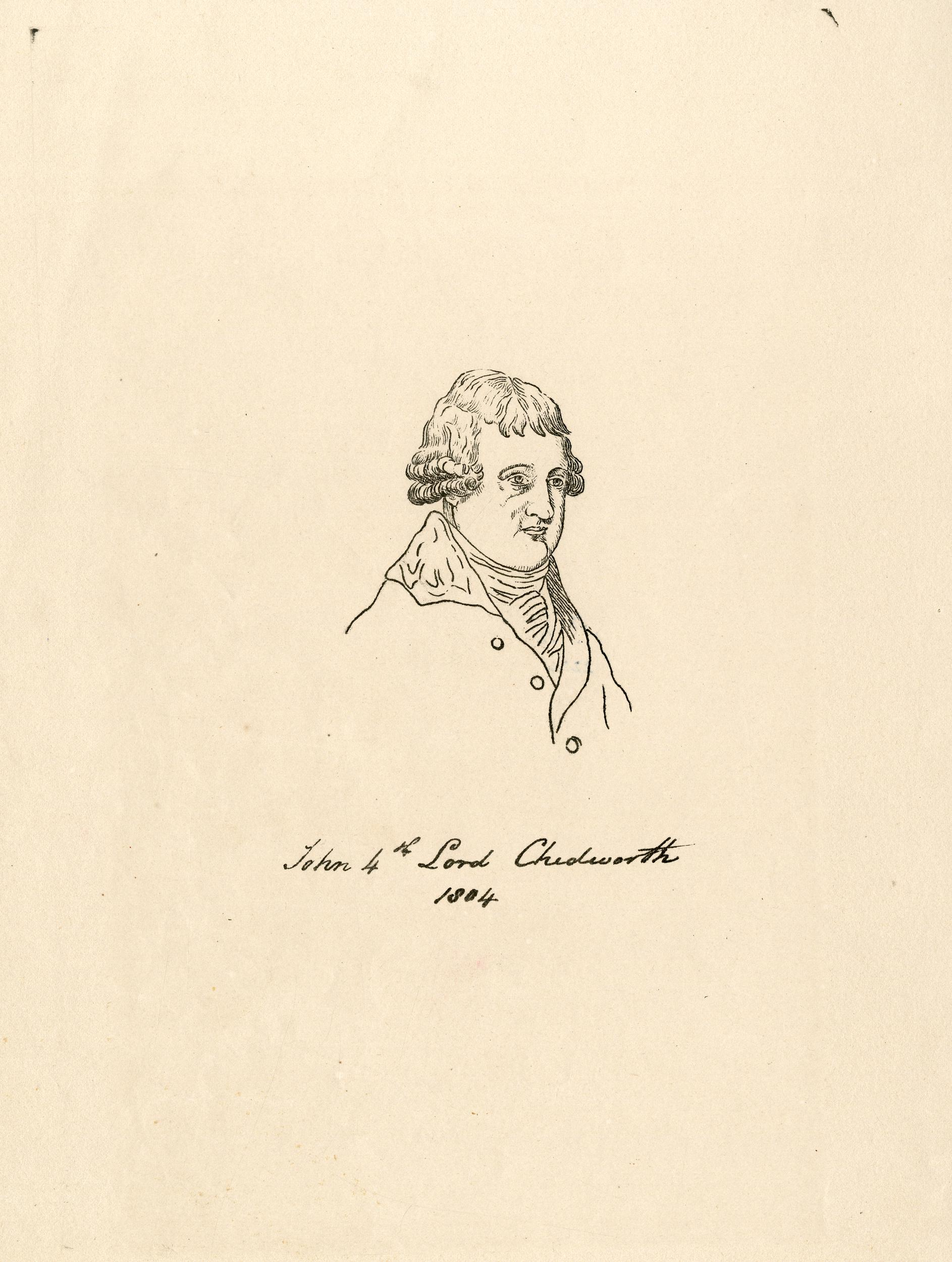
John Howe, 4th Baron Chedworth, in 1804

John Howe, 4th Baron Chedworth (22 August 1754 – 29 October 1804), was a reclusive English aristocrat.

== Life ==
Howe was the son of Thomas Howe (died 1776), rector of Great Wishford and Kingston Deverill, Wiltshire. His mother was Frances, daughter of Thomas White of Tattingstone, near Ipswich, Suffolk. His paternal grandfather was John Howe, 1st Baron Chedworth.

Howe was educated first at Harrow School, where he gave early signs of what was to be a lifelong interest in the stage and the turf. He matriculated at The Queen's College, Oxford, on 29 October 1772, but left without a degree after three years' residence, and took up residence at his mother's house at Ipswich. His mother died in 1778. In 1781 he succeeded his uncle, Henry Howe, 3rd Baron Chedworth, in his title and estates, but he continued to live in comparative seclusion, and seldom visited his properties in Gloucestershire and Wiltshire.

Late in life he lived in the house at Great Yarmouth of his friend Thomas Penrice (1757–1816), a musician and a collector of paintings, descended from a Worcestershire family. He devoted himself to a study of Shakespeare.

He died unmarried in 1804, and the barony became extinct. He was buried, as he had directed, beside his mother in St. Matthew's churchyard, Ipswich, on the fifth day after his death. The inscription on his monument in the church describes him as a man of cultivated tastes and of Whig sympathies.

He left much money to his friend Penrice. Charles James Fox received a legacy of £3,000; many theatrical and other friends were liberally remembered; and large legacies were left to his executors and trustees, by whom the Howe estates in Gloucestershire were divided and sold in 1811 for £268,635. Chedworth's relatives unsuccessfully disputed his will on the ground of insanity.

== Works ==
Chedworth published two pamphlets: Two Actions between John Howe, Esq., and G. L. Dive, Esq., tried by a Special Jury before Lord Mansfield at the Assizes holden at Croydon, August 1781, 2nd edit., London, 1781; and A Charge delivered to the Grand Jury at the General Quarter Sessions of the Peace for the County of Suffolk, Ipswich [1793].

To prove his sanity, Penrice edited for publication Chedworth's Notes upon some of the Obscure Passages in Shakespeare's Plays; with Remarks upon the Explanations and Amendments of the Commentators in the Editions of 1785, 1790, 1793, London, 1805. A friend, Thomas Crompton, published Letters from the late Lord Chedworth to the Rev. Thomas Crompton, written from January 1780 to May 1795, London, 1828.

Peerage of Great Britain
Preceded by Henry Howe	Baron Chedworth; 1781–1804	Extinct
