= Scrope Howe, 1st Viscount Howe =

English politician (1648–1713)

Scrope Howe, 1st Viscount Howe (November 1648 – 26 January 1713) of Langar Hall, Nottinghamshire, was an English politician. He was the Member of Parliament (MP) for Nottinghamshire from 1673 to 1685 and January 1689 to 1691, and from 1710 to 1713.

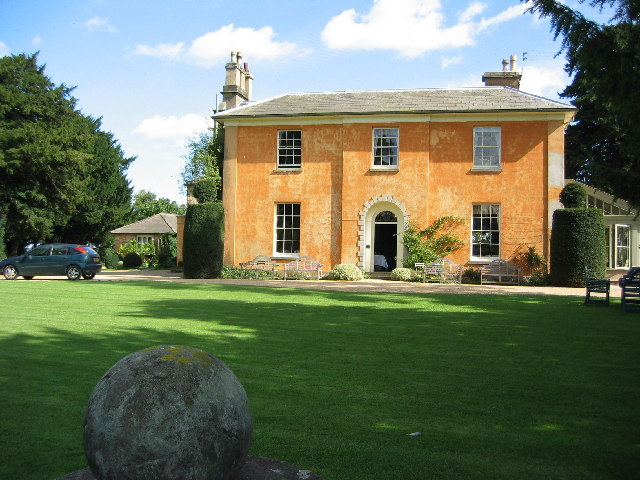
Langar Hall, Nottinghamshire

== Life ==
He was born the eldest son of John Grobham Howe and educated at Christ Church, Oxford, where he was awarded MA on 8 September 1665. His father was the MP for Gloucestershire. His brothers were John Grobham Howe, Charles Howe and Emanuel Howe. He was knighted on 11 March 1663,

From March 1673 to July 1698 he sat in parliament as MP for Nottinghamshire. Howe was an uncompromising whig. On 5 December 1678 he carried up the impeachment of William Howard, 1st Viscount Stafford. In June 1680 Howe, Lord Russell, and others met together with a view to deliver a presentment to the grand jury of Middlesex against the Duke of York for being a papist, but the judges had notice and dismissed the jury before the presentment could be made. On 23 January 1685 he appeared before the king's bench and pleaded not guilty to an allegation of speaking against the Duke of York. Howe made a humble submission, and on the following day the indictment was withdrawn.

He took a part in bringing about the Glorious Revolution, and with the Earl of Devonshire at Nottingham declared for William of Orange in November 1688. In 1693 he was made surveyor-general of the roads, and in the same year was appointed, in succession to Elias Ashmole, comptroller of the accounts of the excise, an office which he appears to have afterwards sold to Edward Pauncfort.

On 16 May 1701, Howe was created Viscount Howe and Baron Glenawley in the Irish peerage, which did not entitle him to enter the House of Lords. In fact he represented Nottinghamshire again in the Parliament of Great Britain from 1710 to his death.

He died in 1713 and was succeeded by his eldest surviving son, Emanuel Howe, 2nd Viscount Howe.

== Family ==
In 1674, he married Lady Anne Manners, the daughter of John Manners, 8th Earl of Rutland. They had three children:

- John Howe, died young
- Hon. Anabella Howe (1674–1720), married George Golding of Poslingford in 1706
- Margaret Howe, married Capt. Mugg

In 1698, he married Hon. Juliana Alington (d. 10 September 1747), the daughter of William Alington, 3rd Baron Alington, by whom he had four children:

- Emanuel Howe, 2nd Viscount Howe (1700–1735)
- Hon. Mary Howe (d. 12 September 1749), married firstly Thomas Herbert, 8th Earl of Pembroke, and secondly Hon. John Mordaunt
- Hon. Judith Howe (d. 2 July 1780), married Thomas Page of Battlesden, son of Sir Gregory Page, 1st Baronet
- Hon. Anne Howe, married Col. Charles Mordaunt, son of Hon. Lewis Mordaunt and grandson of John Mordaunt, 1st Viscount Mordaunt

Parliament of England
Preceded by Anthony Eyre; Sir Francis Leke	Member of Parliament for Nottinghamshire; 1673–1685; With: Sir Francis Leke 1673–1679; John White 1679–1685	Succeeded by Sir William Clifton; Reason Mellish
Preceded by Sir William Clifton; Reason Mellish	Member of Parliament for Nottinghamshire; 1689–1698; With: Lord Houghton 1689; John White 1689–1690, 1691–1698; William Sacheverell 1690–1691	Succeeded by Sir Thomas Willoughby; Gervase Eyre
Preceded by John Thornhagh; Sir Thomas Willoughby	Member of Parliament for Nottinghamshire; 1710–1713; With: William Levinz	Succeeded by William Levinz; Hon. Francis Willoughby
Peerage of Ireland
New creation	Viscount Howe; 1701–1713	Succeeded by Emanuel Howe
New creation	Baron Glenawley; 1701–1713	Succeeded by Emanuel Howe
