= Frederick Curzon, 7th Earl Howe =

British Conservative politician (born 1951)

The Right Honourable The Earl Howe GBE PC
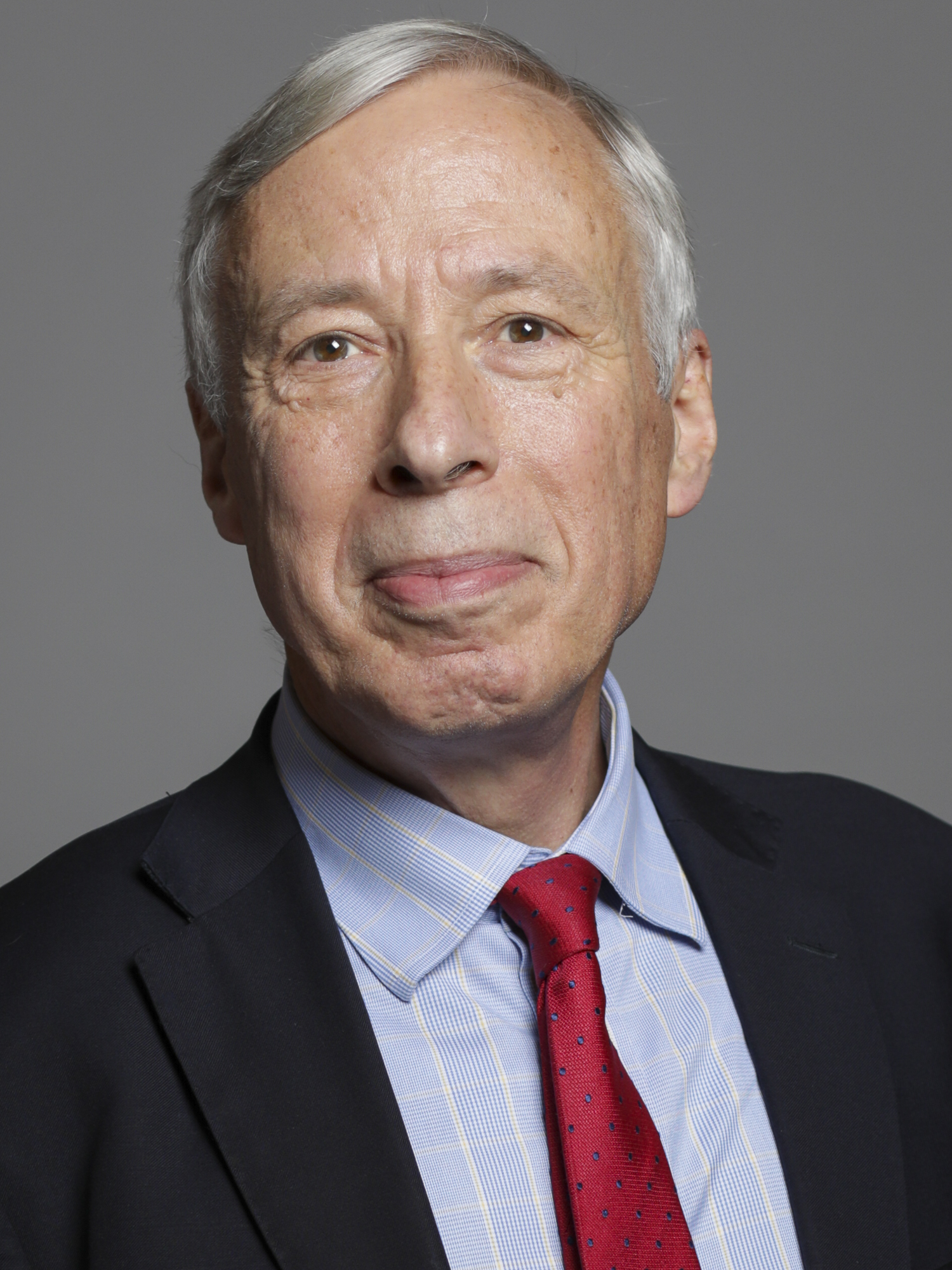
- Official portrait, 2020

Shadow Deputy Leader of the House of Lords
- Incumbent
- Assumed office 19 July 2024
- Leader: The Lord True
- Preceded by: The Lord Collins of Highbury

Deputy Leader of the House of Lords
- In office 12 May 2015 – 5 July 2024
- Prime Minister: David Cameron; Theresa May; Boris Johnson; Liz Truss; Rishi Sunak
- Preceded by: The Lord Wallace of Tankerness
- Succeeded by: The Lord Collins of Highbury

Minister of State for Defence
- In office 11 May 2015 – 26 July 2019
- Prime Minister: David Cameron; Theresa May
- Preceded by: The Lord Astor of Hever
- Succeeded by: The Baroness Goldie

Parliamentary Under-Secretary of State for Health
- In office 17 May 2010 – 11 May 2015
- Prime Minister: David Cameron
- Preceded by: The Baroness Thornton
- Succeeded by: The Lord Prior of Brampton

Parliamentary Under-Secretary of State for Defence
- In office 5 July 1995 – 2 May 1997
- Prime Minister: John Major
- Preceded by: The Lord Henley
- Succeeded by: John Spellar

Parliamentary Secretary to the Ministry of Agriculture, Fisheries and Food
- In office 14 April 1992 – 5 July 1995
- Prime Minister: John Major
- Preceded by: David Curry
- Succeeded by: Tim Boswell

Lord-in-waiting Government Whip
- In office 30 May 1991 – 14 April 1992
- Prime Minister: John Major
- Preceded by: The Lord Reay
- Succeeded by: The Viscount St Davids

Member of the House of Lords Lord Temporal
- Incumbent
- Life peerage 9 June 2026
- Elected Hereditary Peer; 11 November 1999 – 29 April 2026
- Election: 1999
- Preceded by: Seat established
- Succeeded by: Seat abolished
- Hereditary peerage 30 October 1984 – 11 November 1999
- Preceded by: The 6th Earl Howe
- Succeeded by: Seat abolished

Personal details
- Born: 29 January 1951 (age 75)
- Party: Conservative
- Spouse: Elizabeth Helen Stuart (m. 1983)
- Children: 4
- Parent(s): George Curzon; Jane Victoria Fergusson
- Education: Christ Church, Oxford (BA)
- Occupation: Business executive
- Other titles: 8th Viscount Curzon; 8th Baron Curzon; 9th Baron Howe; Baron Curzon of Amersham

Frederick Richard Penn Curzon, 7th Earl Howe, Baron Curzon of Amersham (born 29 January 1951), is a British hereditary peer who has served as Shadow Deputy Leader of the House of Lords since 2024. A member of the Conservative Party, he served previously as the Deputy Leader of the House of Lords from 2015 to 2024 and as Minister of State for Defence from 2015 to 2019. Howe is the longest continuously serving Conservative frontbencher, having held a front bench role in some capacity from 1991.

He inherited the Earldom of Howe in 1984 from his second cousin Edward Curzon, 6th Earl Howe who only had daughters. In May 2026, it was announced that he was to be given one of 26 new life peerages, returning him to the House of Lords after the coming into force of the House of Lords (Hereditary Peers) Act 2026.

== Background and education ==
Lord Howe is the son of the Royal Navy commander and film actor George Curzon, who was a grandson of the 3rd Earl Howe. Lord Howe's mother was Jane Victoria Fergusson, second wife of his father. He was educated at King's Mead School, Seaford, Rugby School, and Christ Church, Oxford, where he graduated in "Mods and Greats" in 1973 and, according to his Who's Who entry, earned the Chancellor's Prize in Latin Verse.

== Business and political career ==
After leaving university in 1973, he joined Barclays Bank and served in a number of managerial and senior managerial posts in London and in other countries. After succeeding his second cousin as 7th Earl Howe in 1984, he left banking to concentrate on his parliamentary activities and on running the family farm (Seagraves Farm Co Ltd) and estate at Penn in south Buckinghamshire. In 1991, Howe became a Lord in Waiting (Government whip in the House of Lords) with responsibilities, successively, for transport, employment, defence and environment. Following the 1992 general election he was appointed Parliamentary Secretary at the Ministry of Agriculture, Fisheries and Food and in 1995 Parliamentary Under-Secretary of State at the Ministry of Defence, a post he relinquished at the 1997 general election.

Howe was opposition spokesman for Health and Social Services in the House of Lords between 1997 and 2010. Howe was unique in being the only member of the Conservative Party to shadow the same portfolio throughout the thirteen years of opposition. Since the House of Lords Act 1999, hereditary peers do not have the automatic right to sit in the Lords. However the Act provides for 92 hereditary peers to remain, and representatives from each faction in the House are elected under Standing Orders of the House. At the election in 1999, Howe was the sixth most popular Conservative peer (Conservatives are by far the largest party grouping of hereditary peers). Apart from his frontbench responsibilities, his special interests include penal affairs and agriculture. He is a member of the all-party groups on penal affairs, abuse investigations, pharmaceuticals, adoption, mental health and epilepsy.

Since Lord Strathclyde retired from the frontbench in January 2013, Howe has been the longest-tenured frontbencher (chosen in 1991).

Howe was appointed Knight Grand Cross of the Order of the British Empire (GBE) in the 2021 Birthday Honours for political and parliamentary service.

== Other public appointments ==
In 1999 Howe was appointed non-executive chairman of the London and Provincial Antique Dealers' Association (LAPADA), the country's largest trade association for the fine art and antiques trade.

Involved in many charitable commitments, Lord Howe is:

- President of the Abbeyfield Beaconsfield Society;
- President of Penn and Tylers Green Residents Society;
- Patron of the Chiltern Society;
- Patron of Design & Manufacture for Disability (DEMAND);
- Hereditary Governor of the King William IV Naval Foundation;
- a trustee of Milton's Cottage;
- President of the Epilepsy Society, formerly the National Society for Epilepsy, for 25 years until his wife Countess Howe became president in September 2010;
- a trustee of RAFT (Restoration of Appearance and Function Trust);
- a member of the Committee of Management of the RNLI;
- a trustee of Sir William Borlase's Grammar School in Marlow, Buckinghamshire;
- President of the South Buckinghamshire Association for the Disabled;
- Honorary Treasurer of the Trident Trust;
- a trustee of Penn Street Village Hall;
- Honorary Vice-President of Kidney Cancer UK, and
- a vice-president at Knotty Green Cricket Club.

== Personal life ==
Lord Howe married Elizabeth Helen Stuart, elder daughter of Captain Burleigh Edward St Lawrence Stuart, on 26 March 1983. They have four children:

- Lady Anna Elizabeth Curzon (19 January 1987), who studied music at the University of Nottingham;
- Lady Flora Grace Curzon (12 June 1989);
- Lady Lucinda Rose Curzon (12 October 1991); and
- Thomas Edward Penn Curzon, Viscount Curzon (22 October 1994).

The family live at Penn House, Penn, Buckinghamshire, seat of the Earls Howe. Countess Howe is active in the Buckinghamshire community, serving as a Deputy Lord Lieutenant from 1995 before becoming Lord Lieutenant in 2020.

== See also ==
- Investigatory Powers Act 2016

Political offices
Preceded by The Lord Wallace of Tankerness	Deputy Leader of the House of Lords; 2015–2024	Succeeded by The Lord Collins of Highbury
Peerage of the United Kingdom
Preceded by Edward Curzon	Earl Howe; 2nd creation 1984–present Member of the House of Lords (1984–1999)	Incumbent; Heir apparent: Thomas Curzon, Viscount Curzon
Preceded by Edward Curzon	Viscount Curzon; 1984–present	Incumbent; Heir apparent: Thomas Curzon, Viscount Curzon
Peerage of Great Britain
Preceded by Edward Curzon	Baron Curzon; 1984–present	Incumbent; Heir apparent: Thomas Curzon, Viscount Curzon
Preceded by Edward Curzon	Baron Howe; 1984–present	Incumbent; Heir apparent: Thomas Curzon, Viscount Curzon
Parliament of the United Kingdom
New office created by the House of Lords Act 1999	Elected hereditary peer to the House of Lords under the House of Lords Act 1999; 1999–2026	Office abolished under the House of Lords (Hereditary Peers) Act 2026
