= Charles Howe (writer) =

English devotional writer and courtier

Charles Howe (1661–1742) was an English devotional writer and courtier during the reigns of Charles II and James II of England and VII of Scotland.

== Life ==
He born in Gloucestershire, the third son of John Grobham Howe of Langar, Nottinghamshire. John Grubham Howe (Jack Howe) was his brother. In youth Howe spent much time at Charles II's court. About 1686 he is said to have gone abroad with a relative who had been appointed ambassador by James II, but declined to accept the office permanently. On returning to England he married Elianor, only daughter and heiress of Sir William Pargiter, of Greatworth, Northamptonshire, and widow of Sir Henry Dering. She died on 25 July 1696, and was buried in Greatworth Church, where an inscription, composed by her husband, remains. After his wife's death in 1696, Howe lived in seclusion in the country, chiefly devoting himself to religious meditation.

He died on 17 February 1742, and was buried in the same vault with his wife and children in Greatworth Church. A monument there was erected to his memory by his granddaughter, Leonora Bathurst.

== Works ==
Devout Meditations, or, A Collection of Thoughts upon Religious and Philosophical Subjects was published in 1751, nine years after Howe's death. This work was written for his own use, and was first published, posthumously, as "by a Person of Honour", in 1751, together with Edward Young's commendations. The author's name was prefixed to the second edition in 1752. The work was included in John Wesley's Christian Library, 1819–27, vol. xxvi., and in John Jebb's Piety without Asceticism, 1837, pp. 255–404.

== Family ==
Charles Howe was the brother of Scrope Howe, 1st Viscount Howe, John Grubham Howe and Emanuel Howe.

He had three sons and three daughters, all of whom predeceased their mother, with the exception of Leonora Maria, who became the wife of Peter Bathurst of Clarendon Park, Wiltshire.
