= Stowell Park =

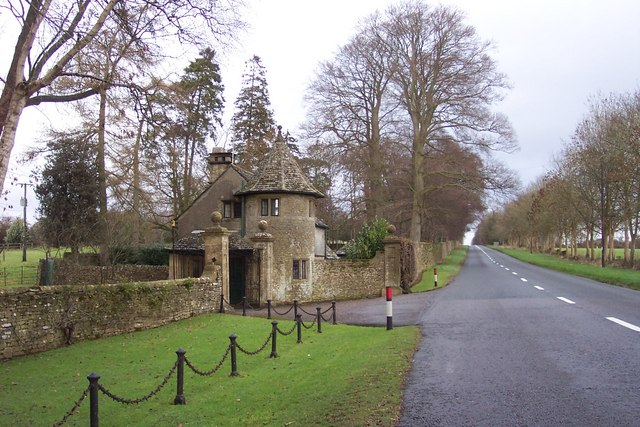
- The Lodge at the entrance to Stowell Park

- Location in Gloucestershire
- 51.822°N 1.892°W
- Location: Gloucestershire, England

Stowell Park Estate is a 6,000-acre (24 km^{2}) historic agricultural and sporting estate in the Cotswold Hills, Gloucestershire, England. The estate includes the village of Yanworth. The main house is a Grade II* listed building and surrounded by extensive parkland, a mill, and church. The landscaped park is listed Grade II on the Register of Historic Parks and Gardens.

== History ==
The house was built around 1600 for Robert Atkinson, on the site of a previous house. The manor is first recorded in 1086 when it was held by the Archbishop of York. The house is Grade II* listed. The Church of St Leonard was the chapel for the owners of the previous house, having been built in the 12th century. The church has been described as "of very great interest, as it contains quite well-preserved fragments of twelfth-century wall-paintings". The estate was passed to relatives of Atkinson until 1685 when it was bought by John Grubham Howe whose descendants owned the estate until 1811 when it was bought by the judge William Scott. He took the title of Baron Stowell from the estate when raised to the peerage upon the coronation of George IV in 1821. On his death in 1824 the estate was inherited by his brother John Scott, 1st Earl of Eldon and passed down through the family until sold in 1923 to 1st Lord Vestey, whose great-great grandson William Vestey, 4th Lord Vestey, is the current head of the family and Chairman of the Vestey Group. During World War II Stowell Park was used for evacuees from Great Ballard School.

== Architecture ==
The main house is L-shaped. The west front is Elizabethan and has five bays as does the north front. Each is surmounted by hipped and crenellated roofs. The west front includes a door with paired Roman Doric pilasters. The current main entrance on the south front was added in the 19th century. The drawing room has panelling remaining from the 16th century.

Within the grounds is a 17th-century dovecote. The former mill powered by water from the River Coln was built in the late 18th century. The Lodge, iron gates and gate piers at the eastern entrance to the estate were added in the late 19th century, when balustrades and steps were added between the house and the lawns. The stable block, which was probably designed by Sir John Belcher, was also added in the late 19th century.

== Grounds ==
The grounds include terraced lawns with surrounding herbaceous borders. There are walled gardens containing fruit and flower beds. It is opened for the National Gardens Scheme each year. The landscaped park is listed Grade II on the Register of Historic Parks and Gardens.

The estate hosts shoots for pheasants. It has also been the home of a polo team with one of the players being the Argentine born Héctor Barrantes.
