= George Curzon (actor) =

English actor (1898–1976)

- Born: Chambré George William Penn Curzon; 18 October 1898; Amersham, Buckinghamshire, England
- Died: 10 May 1976 (aged 77); London, England
- Occupation: Actor
- Years active: 1930–1964
- Spouse(s): Louise Merrill Stone (m. 1927–1942); Jane Victoria Fergusson (m. 1950–1976)
- Children: The 7th Earl Howe; Lady Emma Curzon-Howe

For the British statesman, see George Curzon, 1st Marquess Curzon of Kedleston.

Commander Chambré George William Penn Curzon (18 October 1898 – 7 May 1976), known as George Curzon, was a Royal Navy commander, actor, and father of the present Earl Howe.

Curzon, born in Amersham, Buckinghamshire, England, was the only son of diplomat the Hon. Frederick Curzon-Howe (a son of the 3rd Earl Howe) and his wife, the actress Ellis Jeffreys. Curzon trained for the Navy at the Royal Naval College, Osborne, on the Isle of Wight, and first saw action in the First World War. He retired from the Navy as a lieutenant commander, then served as a King's Messenger before turning to the West End stage in 1930.

Curzon then went to America and appeared on the New York stage in the play Parnell before entering films. He was given a minor role as a police constable in Basil Dean's Escape (1930). His first major role came in 1935 when he appeared as the title role in Sexton Blake and the Bearded Doctor. He reprised this role in Sexton Blake and the Mademoiselle (1935) and Sexton Blake and the Hooded Terror (1938). He appeared in several films directed by Alfred Hitchcock before he moved to the United States and Hollywood, most notably Young and Innocent, where he played a musician and murderer who was caught by his nervous eye-twitch, in a famous long crane shot devised by Hitchcock.

A brief interruption came to Curzon's acting career in 1939 when, after playing a minor role in Hitchcock's Jamaica Inn, he again enlisted in the Navy during World War II. He later starred in various other films from 1947 until 1965.

Curzon had two children from his second marriage, Frederick Richard Penn (born 1951) and Emma Charlotte (born 1953). His son succeeded to his kinsman's title of Earl Howe in 1984 (eight years after the death of Curzon himself in 1976) and his daughter was granted the rank of an earl's daughter a year later (i.e. Lady Emma).

== Filmography ==
- Escape (1930) as Constable
- Chin Chin Chinaman (1931) as Colley
- Murder at Covent Garden (1932) as Belmont
- The Impassive Footman (1932) as Simpson
- After the Ball (1932) as Peter Strange
- Her First Affaire (1932) as Carey Merton
- Strange Evidence (1933) as Stephen Relf
- Trouble (1933) as Captain Vansittart
- The Scotland Yard Mystery (1934) as Dr. Charles Masters
- Java Head (1934) as Edward Dunsack
- The Man Who Knew Too Much (1934) as Gibson
- Lorna Doone (1934) as King James II
- Widow's Might (1935) as Champion
- Sexton Blake and the Bearded Doctor (1935) as Sexton Blake
- Admirals All (1935) as Ping Hi
- Two Hearts in Harmony (1935) as Lord Sheldon
- Sexton Blake and the Mademoiselle (1935) as Sexton Blake
- Mozart (1936) as Lorenzo Da Ponte
- The White Angel (1936) as Mr. Sidney Herbert
- Young and Innocent (1937) as Guy
- Strange Boarders (1938) as Sir Charles
- A Royal Divorce (1938) as Barras
- Sexton Blake and the Hooded Terror (1938) as Sexton Blake
- Q Planes (1939) as Jenkins
- The Mind of Mr. Reeder (1939) as Welford
- Jamaica Inn (1939) as Captain Murray
- Jassy (1947) (uncredited)
- Uncle Silas (1947) as Sleigh
- The First Gentleman (1948) as Duke of York
- That Dangerous Age (1949) as Selby
- For Them That Trespass (1949) as Clark Hall
- Sing Along with Me (1952) as Mr. Palmer
- The Cruel Sea (1953) as Admiral At Party
- Harry Black (1958) as Mr. Philip Tanner
- Woman of Straw (1964) as Second Executive (uncredited)

== Sources ==
- Burke's Peerage & Gentry, 107th edition
