= Sophia Howe =

British noblewoman (1762–1835)

Sophia Charlotte Waller, 2nd Baroness Howe (née Howe; 19 February 1762 – 3 December 1835), was a British noblewoman who became Baroness Howe after the death of her father Richard Howe, 1st Earl Howe, and the extinction of the title Earl Howe. In 1821, the title was revived when her son Richard was created Earl Howe.

== Background ==
She was born the eldest of three daughters of Richard Howe, 1st Earl Howe, and Mary Hartop. Due to there being no available male heir, the title of Earl Howe became extinct upon the death of Richard Howe in 1799. The title of Viscount Howe became extinct in 1814 with the death of her uncle William Howe, 5th Viscount Howe, and was never revived. She inherited the title of Baroness Howe.

== Family ==
Lady Sophia married the Hon. Penn Assheton Curzon, son of Assheton Curzon, 1st Viscount Curzon, in 1787. They had five children, only one of whom survived to old age:

- Elizabeth Curzon (1785–1821)
- George Augustus William Curzon (1788–1805)
- Marianne Curzon (1790–1820)
- Leicester Curzon (1792–1793)
- Richard Curzon-Howe, 1st Earl Howe (1796–1870), ancestor of subsequent earls. He first married Lady Harriet Georgiana Brudenell in 1820. He later married Anne Gore in 1845. He had 13 children.

Howe's first husband died in 1797. In 1812, she married Sir Wathen Waller, oculist to King George III.

== Sources ==
- Heathcote, Tony (2002). The British Admirals of the Fleet 1734-1995. Pen & Sword. ISBN 0-85052-835-6.
- Chichester, Henry M (1885–1900). "Howe, William (1729-1814)" . Dictionary of National Biography. London: Smith, Elder & Co.
- Burke, John (1833), "Waller, Sir Jonathan-Wathen" in A general and heraldic dictionary of the Peerage and baronetage of the British Empire, Henry Colburn, London, 2 vol.
- Dod, Charles R. (1848), The peerage, baronetage, and knightage of Great Britain and Ireland, 8th year, Whitakker and Co., London.

Peerage of Great Britain
Preceded by Richard Howe	Baroness Howe; 1799–1835	Succeeded by Richard Curzon-Howe
