= Sir George Howe, 1st Baronet =

English politician

Sir George Grobham Howe, 1st Baronet (c. 1627 – 26 September 1676), was an English politician who sat in the House of Commons from 1660 to 1676.

Howe was the son of George Howe (d. 1647) of Berwick St Leonard, Wiltshire, and his wife Dorothy Clarke, daughter of Humphrey Clerke of Woodchurch, Kent. He was admitted to Lincoln's Inn on 19 April 1646.

In April 1660 Howe was elected Member of Parliament for Hindon and held the seat until his death in 1676. He was created baronet on 20 June 1660.

Howe died in 1676 and was buried at Berwick St Leonard.

He married Elizabeth Grimston, daughter of Sir Harbottle Grimston, 2nd Baronet, and his wife Mary Croke. Their son James succeeded to the baronetcy and was also MP for Hindon.

Baronetage of England
| New creation | Baronet of Cold Barwick; 1660–1676 | Succeeded by James Howe |
