= Sir Richard Howe, 3rd Baronet =

English landowner and Tory politician

Sir Richard Grobham Howe, 3rd Baronet (c. 1651–1730), of Little Compton, Withington and Chedworth, Gloucestershire, and Great Wishford, Wiltshire, was an English landowner and Tory politician who sat in the English and British House of Commons between 1679 and 1727.

== Early life ==
Howe was the son of Sir Richard Howe, 2nd Baronet, and his wife Lucy St John, daughter of Sir John St John, 1st Baronet, of Lydiard Tregoze, Wiltshire. He matriculated at Christ Church, Oxford, on 13 July 1667. On 12 August 1673, he married Mary Thynne, daughter of Sir Henry Frederick Thynne, 1st Baronet, of Kempsford, Gloucestershire.

== Career ==
Howe was returned unopposed as Member of Parliament (MP) for Hindon at the general elections in February and August 1679 and sat until January 1681. He was returned unopposed as MP for Tamworth in 1685 and sat until 1687.

Howe held an estate at Chedworth, six miles from Cirencester, and at the 1690 general election he was returned in a contest as MP for Cirencester on his own interest. He retained the seat at the 1695 election. He refused to sign the Association in February 1696, and opposed fixing the price of guineas at 22 shillings in March. He voted against the attainder of Sir John Fenwick on 25 November 1696. Shortly after, he was removed from the Gloucestershire commission of the peace for not signing the Association. He planned to stand for Wiltshire at the 1698 election, but was unable to garner enough support. However, he was returned unopposed for Wiltshire at the first general election of 1701 and then defeated in a contest at the second general election of 1701. He was returned as MP for Wiltshire at the 1702 English general election. He succeeded On the death of his father on 1 May 1703, he succeeded to the baronetcy. He voted for the Tack on 28 November 1704. At the 1705 English general election, he was returned again for Wiltshire, and voted against the Court candidate for Speaker on 25 October 1705. He was returned as a Tory at the 1708 British general election, and was appointed to the drafting committee on a bill to prevent bribery at elections on 17 January 1709. He was busy sorting out the complicated affairs of Sir Humphrey Mackworth's Company of Mine Adventurers and in raising the complaints of its proprietors and creditors in Parliament. He voted against the impeachment of Dr Sacheverell in 1710. At the 1710 British general election, he was returned again as a Tory for Wiltshire, and was listed as a 'worthy patriot' who helped detect the mismanagements of the previous administration, and a 'Tory patriot' who opposed to the continuance of war. He was appointed to prepare a bill to restructure the Company of Mine Adventurers on 6 April 1711. He was returned again for Wiltshire at the 1713 British general election, and supported the French Commerce bill. In 1714, he promoted a bill for the repair of several Wiltshire highways.

Howe was returned for Wiltshire in 1715 and 1722, and consistently opposed the Whig administrations. He did not stand at the 1727 British general election.

== Death and legacy ==
Howe died on 3 July 1730 and was buried at Great Wishford. He had no children and left his main estates in Wiltshire and Gloucestershire to his cousin John Howe, 1st Baron Chedworth of Somerset.

Parliament of England
Preceded by Sir Edward Seymour, Bt; Robert Hyde	Member of Parliament for Hindon; February 1679 – 1681; With: Thomas Lambert to August 1679; Sir Richard Howe, Bt from August 1679	Succeeded by Sir Richard Howe, Bt; John Thynne
Preceded by Sir Thomas Thynne, Bt; John Swinfen	Member of Parliament for Tamworth; 1685–1689; With: Sir Henry Gough	Succeeded by Henry Sydney; Sir Henry Gough
Preceded by Thomas Master; John Grobham Howe	Member of Parliament for Cirencester; 1690–1698; With: Henry Powle to Nov 1690; John Grobham Howe from Nov 1690	Succeeded by Henry Ireton; Charles Coxe
Preceded by Sir George Hungerford; Sir Edward Ernle, Bt	Member of Parliament for Wiltshire; 1701; With: Sir George Hungerford	Succeeded by William Ashe; Maurice Ashley
Preceded by William Ashe; Maurice Ashley	Member of Parliament for Wiltshire; 1702–1707; With: Robert Hyde	Succeeded by Parliament of Great Britain
Parliament of Great Britain
Preceded by Parliament of England	Member of Parliament for Wiltshire; 1707–1727; With: Robert Hyde to 1722; Richard Goddard 1722–1727	Succeeded by Sir James Long; John Ivory-Talbot
Baronetage of England
Preceded by Richard Howe	Baronet of Compton; 1703–1730	Succeeded by Emanuel Howe
