= John Howe, 1st Baron Chedworth =

British peer and politician

John Howe, 1st Baron Chedworth (died 3 April 1742) of Stowell Park, Gloucestershire was a British peer and politician.

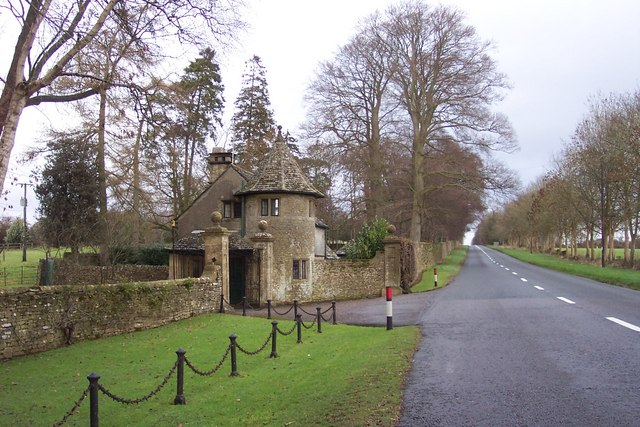
Stowell Park entrance lodge

He was the son of John Grubham Howe, of Stowell, MP and Paymaster General. In 1712, he succeeded his father as Vice-Admiral of Gloucestershire, but was removed from office in 1715.

He was a Member of Parliament, representing the constituencies of Gloucester in 1727 and then Wiltshire from 1729 to 1741. In 1730 he inherited the estates of his cousin Sir Richard Howe, 3rd Baronet, in Wiltshire and Gloucestershire.

On 12 May 1741, he was created Baron Chedworth, but died the following year. He had married, in 1712, Dorothy, the daughter of Henry Frederick Thynne (younger brother of the 1st Viscount Weymouth) of Remnan's, Old Windsor and Sunbury, Middlesex and had 8 sons and 5 daughters. He was succeeded by his eldest son, John Howe, 2nd Baron Chedworth.

Parliament of Great Britain
| Preceded by John Snell; Charles Hyett | Member of Parliament for Gloucester; 1727; With: Charles Hyett | Succeeded by Benjamin Bathurst; Charles Selwyn |
| Preceded by Sir James Long; John Ivory-Talbot | Member of Parliament for Wiltshire; 1729–1741; With: John Ivory-Talbot | Succeeded by Sir Robert Long; Edward Popham |
Honorary titles
| Preceded by John Grobham Howe | Vice-Admiral of Gloucestershire; 1712–1715 | Succeeded by The Earl of Berkeley |
Peerage of Great Britain
| New title | Baron Chedworth; 1741–1742 | Succeeded by John Howe |
