= Assheton Curzon, 1st Viscount Curzon =

British Tory politician (1730–1820)

The Right Honourable The Viscount Curzon
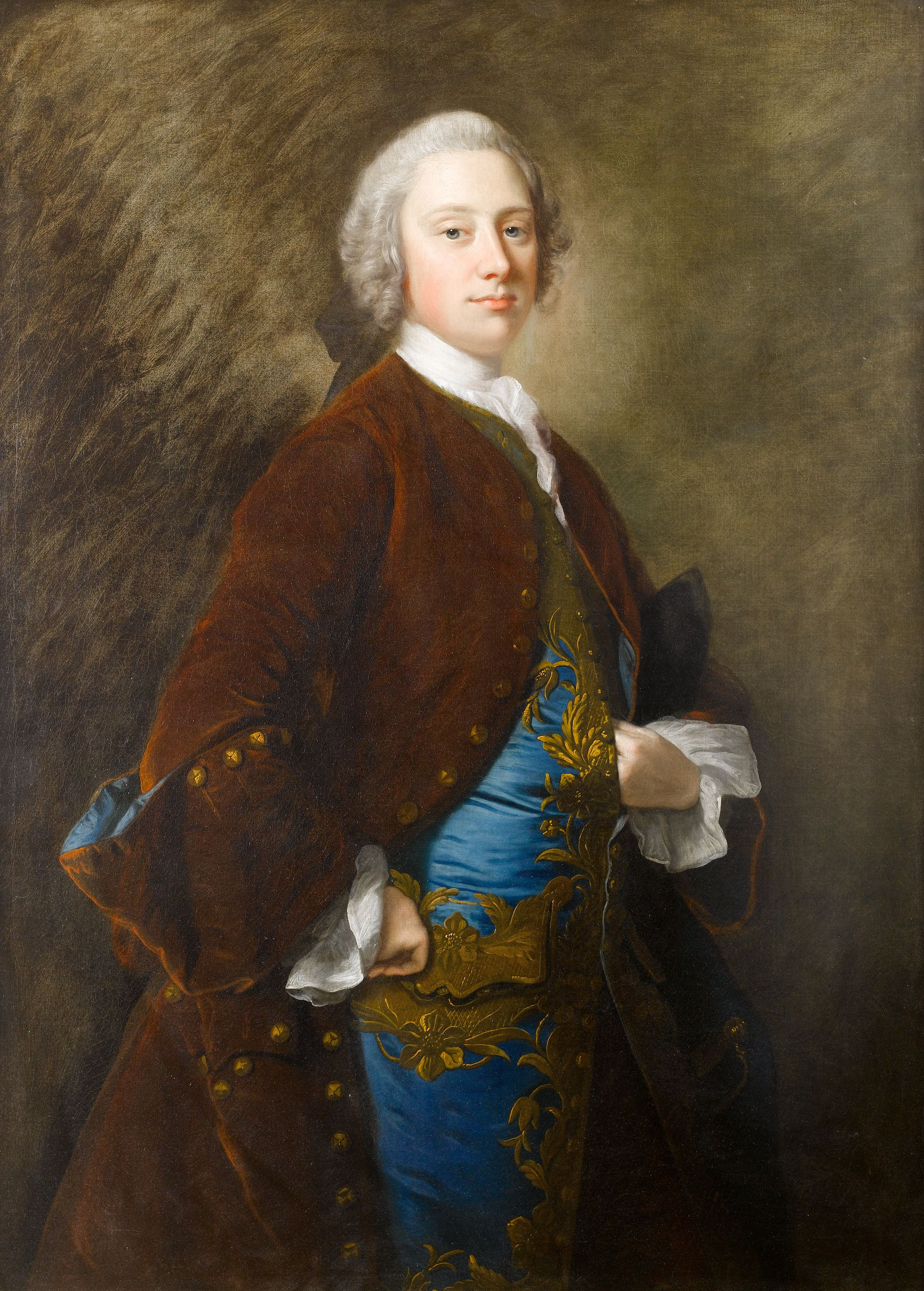
- Curzon in 1802

Member of the House of Lords
- Lord Temporal
- In office 1794 – 21 March 1820
- Preceded by: Peerage created
- Succeeded by: The 2nd Viscount Curzon

Member of Parliament for Clitheroe
- In office 1792–1794
- Preceded by: Penn Curzon
- Succeeded by: Richard Erle-Drax-Grosvenor
- In office 1761–1780
- Preceded by: Nathaniel Curzon
- Succeeded by: John Parker

Personal details
- Born: 2 February 1730
- Died: 21 March 1820 (aged 90)
- Party: Tory
- Spouses: Esther Hanmer (m. 1756; died 1764) Dorothy Grosvenor (m. 1766; died 1774) Anna Margaretta Meredith (m. 1777; died 1804)
- Children: 6
- Parent(s): Sir Nathaniel Curzon, 4th Baronet; Mary Assheton

Assheton Curzon, 1st Viscount Curzon (2 February 1730 – 21 March 1820), styled Lord Curzon between 1794 and 1802, was a British Tory politician.

== Background and education ==
Curzon was the second son of Sir Nathaniel Curzon, 4th Baronet, of Kedleston, Derbyshire, and Mary, daughter of Sir Ralph Assheton, 2nd Baronet. Nathaniel Curzon, 1st Baron Scarsdale, was his elder brother (see Viscount Scarsdale for earlier history of the family). He matriculated at Brasenose College, Oxford in 1747, graduating D.C.L. in 1754.

== Political career ==
Curzon sat as Member of Parliament for Clitheroe from 1754 to 1777 and from 1792 to 1794. In the latter year he was raised to the peerage as Baron Curzon, of Penn in the County of Buckingham, and in 1802 he was further honoured when he was made Viscount Curzon, of Penn in the County of Buckingham.

== Homes ==
In 1752 Curzon acquired Hagley Hall, Rugeley, in Staffordshire, remodelling the house and redesigning the grounds. In 1760 he built Penn House near Amersham in Buckinghamshire, replacing an earlier Tudor building with a red brick country mansion.

He is buried in the church at Penn, Buckinghamshire, with a monument sculpted by Francis Chantrey.

== Family ==
Lord Curzon married firstly Esther Hanmer, daughter of William Hanmer and Elizabeth Jennens (sister of Charles Jennens), in 1756. After her death in July 1764, he married secondly Dorothy Grosvenor, daughter of Sir Robert Grosvenor, 6th Baronet, in 1766. After her death on 24 February 1774, he married thirdly Anna Margaretta Meredith, daughter of Amos Meredith and sister of Sir William Meredith, 3rd Baronet, in 1777. She died in June 1804. There were two sons and four daughters from the two first marriages.

Lord Curzon died in March 1820, aged 90. His son from his first marriage, the Hon. Penn Assheton Curzon, had predeceased him, and he was therefore succeeded by the latter's third but eldest surviving son by his marriage to Sophia Howe, suo jure Baroness Howe (the eldest daughter of Richard Howe, 1st Earl Howe, and his wife Mary Hartop), Richard, who was created Earl Howe in 1821.

His son by his second wife, the Hon. Robert Curzon, represented Clitheroe in Parliament for many years and was the father of Robert Curzon, 14th Baron Zouche. Robert inherited Hagley Hall and various other unentailed properties.

His daughter, the Hon. Charlotte Curzon, married Dugdale Stratford Dugdale of the historic Stratford family, with their descendants becoming the Dugdale baronets in 1936.

== Notes ==
Parliament of Great Britain
Preceded by Thomas Lister; Nathaniel Curzon	Member of Parliament for Clitheroe; 1754–1780; With: Thomas Lister 1754–1761; Nathaniel Lister 1761–1773; Thomas Lister 1773–1780	Succeeded by Thomas Lister; John Parker
Preceded by Sir John Aubrey, Bt; Penn Curzon	Member of Parliament for Clitheroe; 1792–1794; With: Sir John Aubrey, Bt	Succeeded by Sir John Aubrey, Bt; Richard Erle-Drax-Grosvenor
Peerage of the United Kingdom
New creation	Viscount Curzon; 1802–1820	Succeeded by Richard Curzon-Howe
Peerage of Great Britain
New creation	Baron Curzon; 1794–1820	Succeeded by Richard Curzon-Howe
