= Richard Curzon-Howe, 1st Earl Howe =

British peer and politician (1796–1870)

The Right Honourable The Earl Howe GCH PC
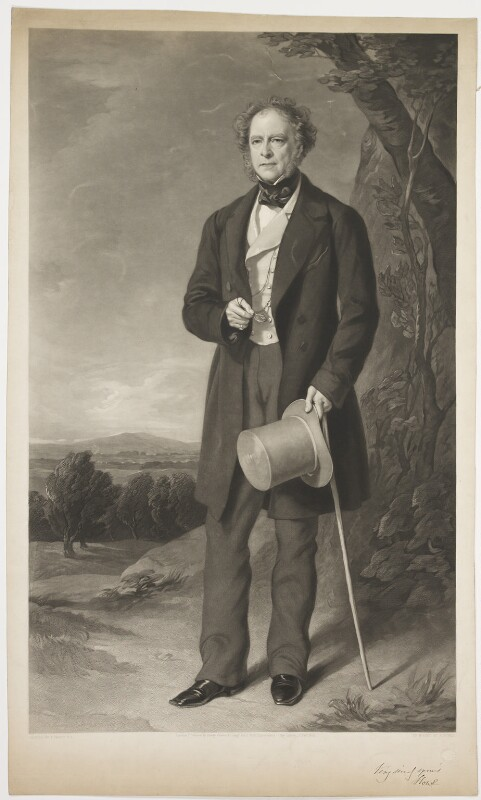
- The Earl Howe, published in 1859

Member of the House of Lords
- Lord Temporal
- In office 21 March 1820 – 12 May 1870
- Preceded by: The 1st Viscount Curzon
- Succeeded by: The 2nd Earl Howe

Personal details
- Born: Richard William Penn Curzon; 11 December 1796
- Died: 12 May 1870 (aged 73)
- Party: Tory
- Spouses: Lady Harriet Georgiana Brudenell (m. 1820; died 1836) Anne Gore (m. 1845)
- Children: 13

Richard William Penn Curzon-Howe, 1st Earl Howe, GCH, PC (11 December 1796 – 12 May 1870), was a British peer and courtier.

== Background ==
He was the third but eldest surviving son of the Hon. Penn Assheton Curzon (the eldest son of Assheton Curzon, 1st Viscount Curzon, and his wife Esther Hanmer), and his wife Sophia Howe, suo jure Baroness Howe (the eldest daughter of Richard Howe, 1st Earl Howe (of the first creation), and his wife Mary née Hartop).

== Public life ==
As his father predeceased his own father, Curzon inherited his grandfather's viscountcy in 1820. He took the additional name of Howe by royal licence a year later and was created Earl Howe (a revival of the title previously held by his maternal grandfather) that year. From 1829 to 1830, he was a Tory Lord of the Bedchamber to King George IV, appointed a GCH in 1830 and was Lord Chamberlain to Queen Adelaide from 1830 to 1831 and again from 1834 to 1837. On his mother's death in 1835, he inherited her barony.

His office gave him considerable influence over the Queen and through her King William IV, both of whom liked and admired him. Malicious gossip that he was the Queen's lover was not taken seriously even at the time, and is entirely discounted by historians. It was his position as an extreme Tory, and his strong opposition to the Reform Act 1832 which made him unacceptable to the Government, and Lord Grey eventually insisted on his dismissal, much to the Queen's distress. Subsequent negotiations to reinstate him came to nothing.

William IV's biographer described him as a man whose vanity and arrogance should have made him insufferable, yet who clearly possessed personal charm great enough to make those who knew him overlook his faults.

== Family ==
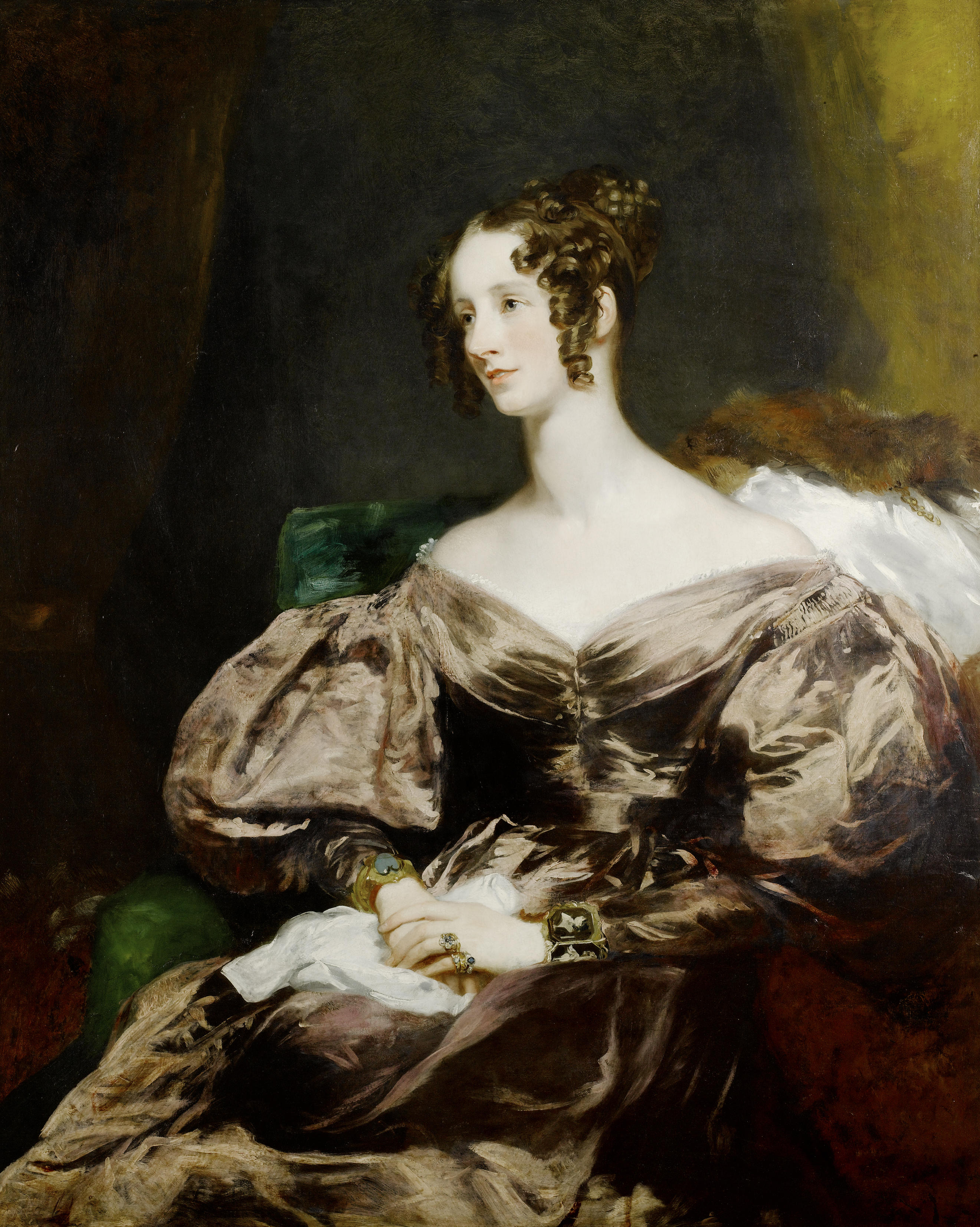
Portrait of Countess Howe, 1834 (by Margaret Sarah Carpenter).

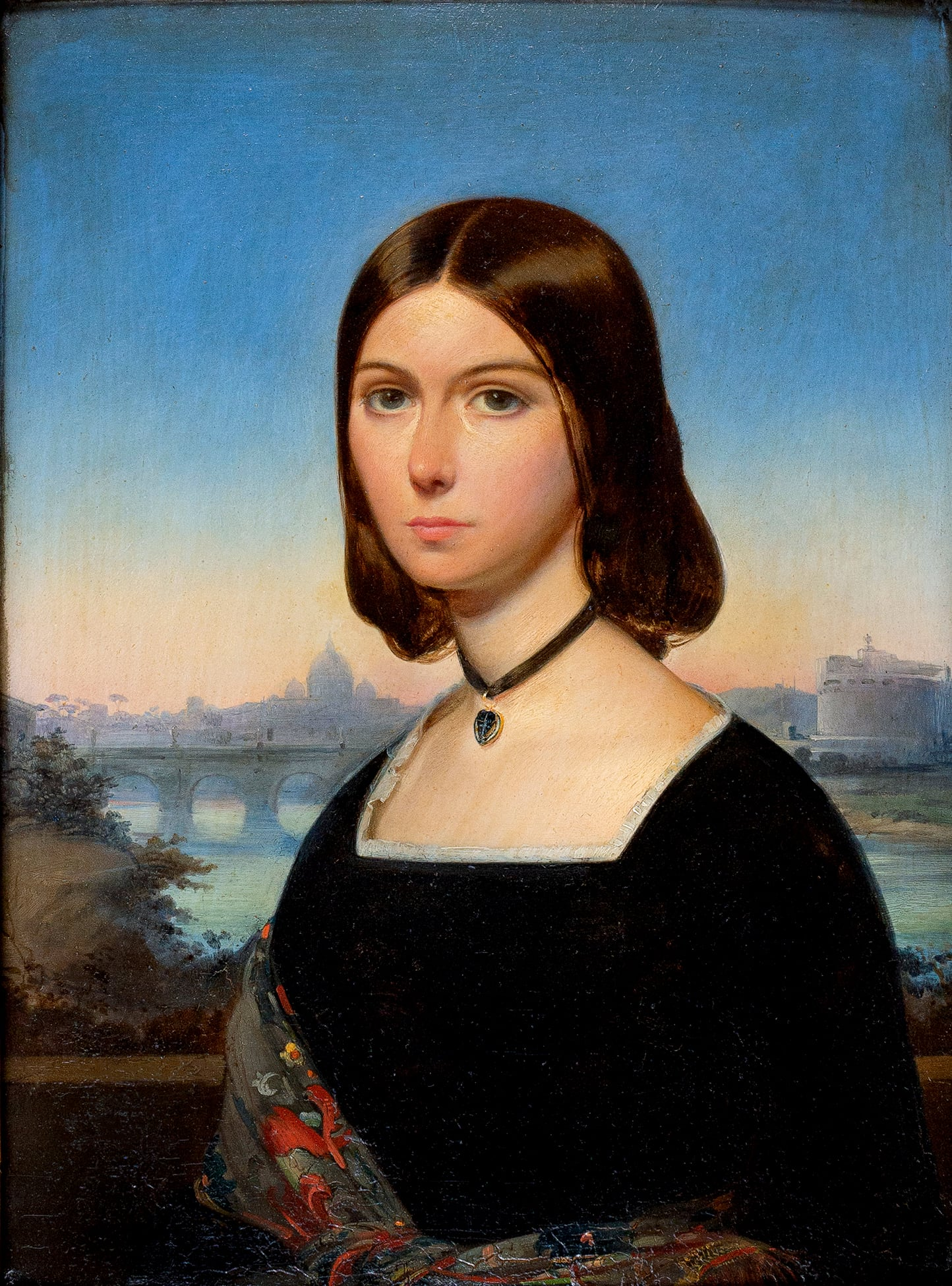
'The Hon Emily Curzon painted at Rome, 1850–51' attributed to Roberto Bompiani

Lord Howe married Lady Harriet Georgiana Brudenell, second daughter of Robert Brudenell, 6th Earl of Cardigan, on 19 March 1820. They had ten children:

- George Augustus Frederick Louis Curzon-Howe, 2nd Earl Howe (1821–1876).
- Richard William Penn Curzon-Howe, 3rd Earl Howe (1822–1900), ancestor of subsequent earls.
- Hon. Frederick Curzon-Howe (1823–1881). Died unmarried.
- Hon. Henry Dugdale Curzon-Howe (1824–1910), married Eleanor Young Swinburne (died 28 August 1887), daughter of Maj.-Gen. John Swinburne of Keynsham, Somerset, on 22 October 1857. They had six children.
- Lady Georgiana Charlotte Curzon-Howe (1825–1906), married Henry Somerset, 8th Duke of Beaufort.
- Maj. Hon. William Henry Curzon-Howe (1827–1914), married first Beatrice Louisa Margaret Page (died 10 July 1873) on 26 October 1870. He later married Emily Cowper, daughter of Frederick Cowper JP for Cumberland, on 3 November 1874. They had one daughter.
- Hon. Ernest George Curzon-Howe (1828–1885), married Augusta Latham Hallifax (circa 1835 – 24 December 1917), daughter of Brig. Gen. Robert Dampier Hallifax and granddaughter of Samuel Hallifax, Bishop of Gloucester and St. Asaph. They had six children.
- Hon. Leicester Smyth (1829–1891).
- Lady Adelaide Curzon-Howe (1835–1903), married Francis Fane, 12th Earl of Westmorland.
- Lady Emily Mary Curzon-Howe (1836–1910), married Sir Robert Kingscote. She was a Lady of the Bedchamber to Queen Alexandra.

Howe's first wife died in 1836, and on 9 October 1845, he married Anne Gore (died 1877), second daughter of Admiral Sir John Gore. They had three children:

- Hon. Montagu Curzon (21 September 1846 – 1 September 1907), married on 19 October 1886 to Esmé FitzRoy (1859 – 25 May 1939), daughter of Francis Horatio FitzRoy (1823–1900) and wife Gertrude Duncombe (born 1827). Their daughter Mary married the 5th Earl Howe, her half–first cousin once removed, and was mother of the 6th Earl Howe.
- Lady Mary Anna Curzon-Howe (1848–1929), married the 2nd Duke of Abercorn; ancestors of subsequent dukes.
- Admiral Sir Assheton Gore Curzon-Howe (1850–1911)

Court offices
New office	Lord Chamberlain to Queen Adelaide; 1830–1831	Vacant Title next held by The Earl of Denbigh
Preceded by The Earl of Denbigh	Lord Chamberlain to Queen Adelaide; 1834–1837	Office abolished
Peerage of the United Kingdom
New creation	Earl Howe; 2nd creation 1821–1870	Succeeded by George Curzon-Howe
Preceded by Assheton Curzon	Viscount Curzon; 1820–1870; Member of the House of Lords (1820–1870)	Succeeded by George Curzon-Howe
Peerage of Great Britain
Preceded by Assheton Curzon	Baron Curzon; 1820–1870	Succeeded by George Curzon-Howe
Preceded by Sophia Waller	Baron Howe; 1835–1870	Succeeded by George Curzon-Howe
