= Richard Curzon, 4th Earl Howe =

British courtier and Conservative politician

The Right Honourable The Earl Howe GCVO TD JP
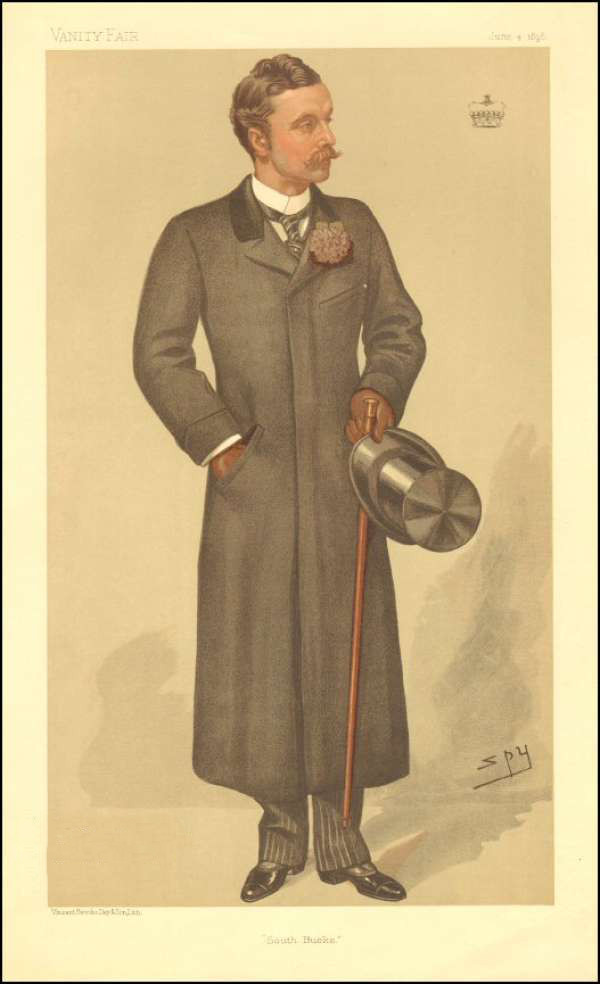
- "South Bucks". Caricature by "Spy" (Leslie Ward) published in Vanity Fair in 1896.

Lord-in-Waiting Government Whip
- In office 30 October 1900 – 1 October 1903
- Monarchs: Victoria; Edward VII
- Prime Minister: The Marquess of Salisbury; Arthur Balfour
- Preceded by: The Earl of Clarendon
- Succeeded by: The Earl of Erroll

Treasurer of the Household
- In office 11 February 1896 – 30 October 1900
- Monarch: Victoria
- Prime Minister: The Marquess of Salisbury
- Preceded by: Marquess of Carmarthen
- Succeeded by: Victor Cavendish

Member of the House of Lords
- Lord Temporal
- In office 26 September 1900 – 10 January 1929
- Preceded by: The 3rd Earl Howe
- Succeeded by: The 5th Earl Howe

Member of Parliament for Wycombe
- In office 18 December 1885 – 25 September 1900
- Preceded by: Gerard Smith
- Succeeded by: William Grenfell

Personal details
- Born: 28 April 1861
- Died: 10 January 1929 (aged 67)
- Party: Conservative
- Spouse(s): (1) Lady Georgiana Spencer Churchill (1860–1906) (2) Florence Davis (d. 1925) (3) Lorna Curzon (d. 1961)
- Children: Francis Curzon, 5th Earl Howe
- Parent(s): Richard Curzon-Howe, 3rd Earl Howe; Isabella Anson
- Education: Christ Church, Oxford

Richard George Penn Curzon, 4th Earl Howe, GCVO, TD, JP (28 April 1861 – 10 January 1929), styled Viscount Curzon between 1876 and 1900, was a British courtier and Conservative politician. He served as Treasurer of the Household between 1896 and 1900 and was Lord Chamberlain to Queen Alexandra.

== Background and education ==
Curzon was the eldest son of Richard Curzon-Howe, 3rd Earl Howe, and his wife, Isabella Maria Katherine Anson, daughter of Major-General the Hon. George Anson and his wife, the Hon. Isabella Elizabeth Annabella Weld-Forester. He was educated at Eton and Christ Church, Oxford.

== Career ==
He served as a member of the council of Royal College of Music in London; and on the committee of Queen Alexandra's field force fund. Then he worked with the British military forces as honorary lieutenant colonel in the 2nd battalion Royal Leicestershire Regiment voluntary regiment, and voluntary regiment captain for Leicestershire Yeomanry, he gained a Territorial Decoration.

=== Politics ===
In 1885, Curzon was elected Member of Parliament for Wycombe. He became a government member when he was appointed Treasurer of the Household under Lord Salisbury in 1896, a post he held until 1900, when he inherited his father's titles and gave up his seat in the House of Commons. He then served as From 1900 to 1903 and he served as Lord-in-waiting under Salisbury and then Arthur Balfour; he served Queen Victoria 1900–1901, and King Edward VII 1901–1903. In 1903 he was made a Knight Grand Cross of the Royal Victorian Order and appointed Lord Chamberlain to Queen Alexandra. He served in that post until the Queen's death in 1925.

Lord Howe was also a captain in the Prince Albert's Own Leicestershire Yeomanry Cavalry, an honorary lieutenant-colonel in the 2nd Battalion of the Leicestershire Volunteer Regiment and a Justice of the Peace for Buckinghamshire.

His brother-in-law, Lord Randolph Churchill, appointed him one of his two literary executors; in that capacity he gave his consent to Winston Churchill writing the biography of his father, although with some reluctance.

== Honours and decorations ==
Lord Howe was appointed a Knight Grand Cross of the Royal Victorian Order (GCVO) in 1903.

He also received several foreign awards:

- Order of Leopold (Belgium).
- Order of Charles III Spain.
- Order of St. Olav Norway.
- Order of the White Eagle (Poland).
- Order of the Dannebrog from Denmark.
- Order of the Polar Star from Sweden.
- Order of the Red Eagle from Prussia.
- Grand officer in Legion of Honour.
- Order of the Redeemer of Greece.

== Family ==
Lord Howe married Lady Georgiana Elizabeth Spencer-Churchill (14 May 1860 – 9 February 1906), the fifth daughter of John Spencer-Churchill, 7th Duke of Marlborough, and his wife Lady Frances Anne Emily Vane, on 4 June 1883 at St George's, Hanover Square. Thus, he was Winston Churchill's uncle by marriage. They had one son, Francis.

Lady Georgiana and Lady Chesham initiated in December 1899 the funding of a hospital to be sent to South Africa with the Imperial Yeomanry fighting in the Second Boer War. They raised more than £100,000, leading to the creation of the Imperial Yeomanry Hospital, with a base hospital, a field hospital and bearer companies. Lady Howe later edited a book recording the work of the Imperial Yeomanry Hospital, published in December 1902.

After his first wife's death in 1906, Curzon married Florence, Dowager Marchioness of Dufferin and Ava, in 1919. After her death in 1925, he married his first cousin once removed, Lorna Curzon. He died in January 1929, aged 67, and was succeeded by his only son, Francis. The Countess Howe died in February 1961.

Parliament of the United Kingdom
Preceded by Gerard Smith	Member of Parliament for Wycombe; 1885–1900	Succeeded by William Grenfell
Political offices
Preceded by Marquess of Carmarthen	Treasurer of the Household; 1896–1900	Succeeded by Victor Cavendish
Preceded by The Earl of Clarendon	Lord-in-waiting; 1900–1903	Succeeded by The Earl of Erroll
Court offices
Preceded by The Viscount Colville of Culross	Lord Chamberlain to Queen Alexandra; 1903–1925	Office lapsed Death of Queen Alexandra
Peerage of the United Kingdom
Preceded by Richard Curzon-Howe	Earl Howe; 2nd creation 1900–1929; Member of the House of Lords (1900–1929)	Succeeded by Francis Curzon
Preceded by Richard Curzon-Howe	Viscount Curzon; 1900–1929	Succeeded by Francis Curzon
Peerage of Great Britain
Preceded by Richard Curzon-Howe	Baron Curzon; 1900–1929	Succeeded by Francis Curzon
Preceded by Richard Curzon-Howe	Baron Howe; 1900–1929	Succeeded by Francis Curzon
