= Richard Curzon-Howe, 3rd Earl Howe =

British Army general

General The Right Honourable The Earl Howe GCVO CB

Lord Lieutenant of Leicestershire
- In office 19 June 1888 – 25 September 1900
- Monarch: Victoria
- Preceded by: The 6th Duke of Rutland
- Succeeded by: The 8th Duke of Rutland

Member of the House of Lords
- Lord Temporal
- In office 5 February 1876 – 25 September 1900
- Preceded by: The 2nd Earl Howe
- Succeeded by: The 4th Earl Howe

Personal details
- Born: 14 February 1822
- Died: 25 September 1900 (aged 78)
- Party: Conservative
- Spouse: Isabella Anson (m. 1858)
- Children: 4
- Parent(s): Richard Curzon-Howe, 1st Earl Howe; Lady Harriet Brudenell

General Richard William Penn Curzon-Howe, 3rd Earl Howe, GCVO, CB (14 February 1822 – 25 September 1900) was a British hereditary peer and British Army officer.

== Background ==
Curzon-Howe was the second son of Richard Curzon-Howe, 1st Earl Howe, and his first wife, Lady Harriet Georgiana Brudenell.

== Military career ==
In 1838, Curzon-Howe joined the British Army and rose through the ranks as a major general in 1869, a lieutenant-general in 1877 and a general in 1880. He fought in the Kaffir War and was present at the Siege of Delhi, for which he was appointed a CB in 1858.

In 1876, Curzon-Howe inherited his elder brother's titles. He was appointed honorary colonel of the Prince Albert's Own Leicestershire Yeomanry cavalry in 1876, colonel of the 94th and 17th Regiment of Foot in 1879 and colonel of the 2nd Life Guards in 1890. In 1897, he was appointed a GCVO for his services as Lord Lieutenant of Leicestershire, a post he held between 1888 and 1900.

== Family ==
Lord Howe married Isabella Maria Katherine Anson (born 1832), eldest daughter of the Hon. George Anson and his wife, the Hon. Isabella Elizabeth Annabella Weld-Forester, on 8 February 1858. They had four children:

- Richard George Penn Curzon, 4th Earl Howe (1861–1929).
- Lady Evelyn Alice Curzon (1862–1913), who married John Eyre in 1896.
- Hon. Frederick Graham Curzon (1868–1920), who married actress Ellis Jeffreys and left children, including commander (later actor) George Curzon (1898–1976), the father of the present 7th Earl who succeeded his second cousin, the 6th Earl, in 1984.
- Lady Edith Cecilia Curzon (died 1936) who married Harry Walter Franklin in 1896.

Military offices
Preceded by Henry Jervis	Colonel of the 94th Regiment of Foot; 1879	Succeeded by Sir John Grant
Preceded by William Faber	Colonel of the 17th Regiment of Foot; 1879–1890	Succeeded by John Guise
Preceded by The Viscount Templetown	Colonel of the 2nd Regiment of Life Guards; 1890–1900	Succeeded by The Lord Chelmsford
Honorary titles
New title	Honorary Colonel of the Leicestershire Yeomanry; 1876–1895	Succeeded by J. W. Baillie
Preceded by The Duke of Rutland	Lord Lieutenant of Leicestershire; 1888–1900	Succeeded by The Duke of Rutland
Peerage of the United Kingdom
Preceded by George Curzon-Howe	Earl Howe; 2nd creation 1876–1900; Member of the House of Lords (1876–1900)	Succeeded by Richard Curzon-Howe
Preceded by George Curzon-Howe	Viscount Curzon; 1876–1900	Succeeded by Richard Curzon-Howe
Peerage of Great Britain
Preceded by George Curzon-Howe	Baron Curzon; 1876–1900	Succeeded by Richard Curzon-Howe
Preceded by George Curzon-Howe	Baron Howe; 1876–1900	Succeeded by Richard Curzon-Howe
