= John Grubham Howe =

English politician

John Grubham Howe (1657–1722) was an English politician. Elected on numerous occasions as Member of Parliament, he made the transition from the Whig to the Tory faction.

== Early life ==
He was second son of John Grobham Howe of Langar, Nottinghamshire, who was member of parliament for Gloucestershire. His mother was Annabella, third and youngest illegitimate daughter and coheiress of Emanuel Scrope, 1st Earl of Sunderland. Early in life he figured as a young and amorous courtier. In 1679 he brought an accusation against Frances Stewart, Duchess of Richmond, which on investigation proved to be false, and he was forbidden to attend the court. At this period he wrote verses.

== Member of Parliament ==
Following the Glorious Revolution he sat for Cirencester in the Convention parliament, January 1689 to February 1690, and in its two successors 1690–1695 and 1695–1698. The county of Gloucester returned him in 1698, and again in January 1701. At the subsequent election (December 1701) the Whigs concentrated efforts against him and ejected him from the seat. In Queen Anne's first parliament (1702) Howe was returned for four constituencies (Bodmin, Gloucester city, Gloucester county, and Newton in Lancashire); and chose his old seat for Gloucestershire. A petition by Sir John Guise, his opponent for the county, against his return was defeated by 219 votes to 98. After 1705 he ceased to sit in parliament.

At the beginning of William III's reign Howe had urged severe measures against such politicians as Carmarthen and Halifax, identified with the measures of James II. He was then a strong Whig, and in 1689 was appointed vice-chamberlain to Queen Mary. Early in March 1692 the queen dismissed him from that post, and he at the same time lost the minor position of Keeper of the Mall. In the following November he was summoned before the court of verge for wounding a servant of his in Whitehall, and on pleading guilty was pardoned (December 1692). From this time he became a fierce Tory. He took an active part against Gilbert Burnet for his 'Pastoral Letter,' and spoke vehemently against the prosecution of the war and on behalf of Sir John Fenwick. He served among those appointed by the House of Commons to bring in a bill on the forfeited estates in Ireland (December 1699), and thundered in parliament over the grants to King William's Dutch friends of some of the property. Howe's attack on the partition treaty, which he denounced by the title of the 'Felonious Treaty,' was so savage that William exclaimed that but for their disparity of station he would have demanded satisfaction. Howe denounced foreign settlers in England and standing armies. When the army was reduced (1699) he succeeded in obtaining half-pay for the disbanded officers.

With Queen Anne's accession Howe was once more a courtier, and in 1702 moved that a provision of £100,000 a year should be secured to her consort, Prince George of Denmark. He was created a privy councillor on 21 April 1702, and Vice-Admiral of Gloucestershire on 7 June. On the retirement of Richard Jones, 1st Earl of Ranelagh, the post of Paymaster-General was divided, and Howe was appointed paymaster of the guards and garrisons at home (4 January 1702 – 1714).

== Later life ==
On 15 May 1708 he became joint clerk to the privy council of Great Britain. After Anne's death his places were taken from him, and his name was left out of the list of privy councillors. He then retired to Stowell Park in Gloucestershire, an estate which he had purchased, and died there in June 1722, being buried in the chancel of the church on 14 June.

== Works, reputation and legacy ==
There are verses by him in the Collection of Poetry of John Nichols and he is said to have written a Panegyric on King William. An anecdote by Sir Thomas Lyttelton in illustration of his speaking talents is in the Gentleman's Magazine, and he is introduced into Jonathan Swift's ballad On the Game of Traffic. A satirical speech of Monsieur Jaccou (i.e. Jack How), purporting to be 'made at the general quarter sessions for the county of G—r,' and ridiculing his vanity and French leanings, was printed. Thomas Babington Macaulay speaks of him as tall, thin, and haggard in look.

== Family ==
His wife was Mary, daughter and coheiress of Humphry Baskerville of Poentryllos in Herefordshire, and widow of Sir Edward Morgan of Llanternam, Monmouthshire. His son and heir John Howe was the first Baron Chedworth.

== Notes ==
Political offices
Preceded by Earl of Ranelagh	Paymaster of the Forces; 1702–1714	Succeeded by Sir Robert Walpole

Attribution

This article incorporates text from a publication now in the public domain: "Howe, John Grubham". Dictionary of National Biography. London: Smith, Elder & Co. 1885–1900.
