= Howe (surname) =

Howe is an English surname with Scandinavian roots. Howe is an Old Norse surname derived from haugr, meaning in the Viking era a hill, knoll, or burial mound and may refer to a tumulus, or barrow. However when derived from Old English: hol, it can refer to a hollow or dell. Historically the surname was most commonly found in the Northeast of England and the Orkney and Shetland islands near the Norwegian coastline.

Maeshowe (or Maes Howe; Old Norse: Orkahaugr) is a Neolithic chambered cairn and passage grave situated in Scotland's Orkney Islands. It was probably built around 2800 BC. Similarly Midhowe is located on the Orkney Islands, dated to 3500 BC. Duggleby Howe (also known as Howe Hill, Duggleby) is one of the largest round barrows in Britain, located in the county of North Yorkshire (historically the East Riding of Yorkshire). Yorkshire experienced several distinct Viking incursions, with residents having an ancestry with their roots in the North Sea.

Notable people with the surname include:

== A–H ==
- Albion P. Howe (1818–1897), American Union Army general in the American Civil War
- Andrew Howe (born 1985), American-born Italian long jumper
- Anthony Howe (historian) (born 1950), English historian
- Anthony Howe (sculptor) (born 1954), American artist
- Art Howe (born 1946), American professional baseball player and manager
- Brian Howe (politician) (born 1936), Australian politician
- Brian Howe (singer) (1953–2020), English musician (Bad Company)
- C. D. Howe (1886–1960), Canadian politician
- Caroline Dana Howe (1824–1907), American writer
- Charlotte Howe, Viscountess Howe (1703–1782), British courtier and politician
- Clinton Howe, Australian politician
- Daniel Walker Howe (born 1937), American historian
- Darcus Howe (1943–2017), British broadcaster and columnist
- David Howe (speedway rider) (born 1982), British motorcycle speedway rider
- David J. Howe (born 1961), British writer, journalist, publisher, and media historian
- Denis Howe (1928–2020), English footballer
- Denis Howe (editor), editor, founder of the Free On-line Dictionary of Computing (FOLDOC)
- Don Howe (1935–2015), English footballer
- Don Howe (footballer, born 1917) (1917–1978), English footballer of the 1930s, '40s and '50s
- Dylan Howe (born 1969), English jazz drummer
- E. Graham Howe (1897–1975), British psychiatrist
- Eddie Howe (born 1977), English football manager and former footballer
- Edgar Watson Howe (1853–1937), American novelist
- Edward Gardiner Howe (1849–1931), American educator and author
- Elias Howe (1819–1867), American inventor of the sewing machine
- Eliot Howe (1882–1921), American film director
- Elizabeth Howe (1635–1692), accused of witchcraft and hanged during the Salem witch trials
- Elliot C. Howe (1828–1899), American botanist
- Emanuel Howe, 2nd Viscount Howe (1700–1735), British politician and colonial administrator
- Emeline Harriet Howe (1844–1934), American poet
- Fanny Howe (1940–2025), American poet and writer
- Frederic C. Howe (1867–1940), Ohio Senator and commissioner of Ellis Island
- Geoffrey Howe (1926–2015), British politician, Chancellor of the Exchequer under Margaret Thatcher
- George Howe (disambiguation), several people
- Gilman Bigelow Howe (1850–1933), American genealogist
- Gordie Howe (1928–2016), Canadian Hall-of-Fame hockey player
- Greg Howe (born 1963), American musician
- Harrison E. Howe (1881–1942), American chemist
- Henry Howe (actor) (1812–1896), English actor
- Henry Marion Howe, (1848–1922), American metallurgist
- Herbert Alonzo Howe (1858–1926), American astronomer and educator

== I–Z ==
- Irving Howe (1920–1993), American literary and social critic
- Jackie Howe (1861–1920), Australian sheep shearer
- James Lewis Howe (1859–1955), American chemist
- James Wong Howe (1899–1976), Chinese-born American cinematographer
- Jamie Howe (born 1984), American auto racing reporter
- Jens Howe (born 1961), German fencer
- Jeremy Howe (born 1990), Australian rules football player
- Jeremy Howe (English footballer) (born 1973), English footballer
- Jeremy Howe (radio drama editor) (born 1956), English radio drama editor
- John Howe (illustrator) (born 1957), Canadian illustrator
- John Howe (theologian) (1630–1705), English Puritan theologian
- John Grubham (Jack) Howe (1657–1722), English politician
- Joseph Howe (1804–1873), Nova Scotia politician
- Josias Howe (c.1611–1701), English divine
- Julia Ward Howe (1819–1910), American poet and author, best known as author of the "Battle Hymn of the Republic"
- Julie Howe, California screenwriter
- Leila Hassan Howe (born 1948), British editor and activist
- Les Howe (1895–1976), American baseball player
- Linda Moulton Howe (born 1942), American investigative journalist and documentary maker
- Louis McHenry Howe (1871–1936), political advisor to President Franklin D. Roosevelt
- Marie Howe (born 1950), American poet
- Marie E. Howe (1939–2024), American politician in Massachusetts
- Marie Jenney Howe (1870–1934), American feminist organizer and writer
- Mark Howe (born 1955), younger son of Gordie Howe, American–Canadian Hall-of-Fame hockey player
- Marshall Avery Howe (1867–1936), American botanist
- Marty Howe (born 1954), older son of Gordie Howe, American–Canadian hockey player
- Mary Howe (1882–1964), American composer and pianist
- Mary Howe (soprano) (1870–1952), American operatic soprano
- Mary Washington Howe (1852–1900), American educator
- Michael Howe (bushranger) (1787–1818), Australian bushranger
- Michael Howe (psychologist) (1940–2002), British cognitive psychologist
- Mike Howe (1965–2021), American musician
- Neil Howe (born 1951), American historian, economist and demographer
- Oscar Howe (1915–1983), American Indian artist
- Paul Howe (born 1968), British swimmer
- Paul R. Howe (born 1959) U.S. Delta Force member and firearms instructor
- Peter Howe (1884–?), English footballer
- Rex Howe (1929–2024), British Anglican priest
- Richard Howe, 1st Earl Howe (1726–1799), British admiral in the French Revolutionary Wars and American Revolution
- Rick Howe (1954–2024), Canadian radio personality and writer
- Robert Howe (Continental Army officer) (1732–1786), American general
- Roger Evans Howe (born 1945), American mathematician
- Russell Warren Howe (1925–2008), British author and journalist
- Samuel Gridley Howe (1801–1876), American abolitionist and educator
- Sarah Howe (born 1983), Chinese–British poet
- Sarah Howe (fraudster) (c. 1826–1892), American fraud artist
- Shauna Howe (1981–1992), American murder victim
- Sean Howe, American journalist and writer
- Scrope Howe, 1st Viscount Howe (1648–1714), English politician who took part in the Glorious Revolution
- Sonia E. Howe (1871–?), Russian essayist
- Steve Howe, (born 1947), English musician and songwriter (Yes)
- Steve Howe (baseball) (1958–2006), American baseball player
- Stuart Howe (born 1967), Canadian operatic tenor
- Susan Howe (born 1937), American poet, scholar, essayist, and critic
- Tamara Howe (born 1965), daughter of Darcus Howe, English television production manager
- Timothy O. Howe (1816–1883), American politician
- Tina Howe (1937–2023), American playwright
- Vic Howe (1929–2015), Canadian hockey player, Gordie Howe's brother
- W. B. W. Howe Jr. (1851–1912), American architect
- Wallace Howe (1878–1957), American actor
- Will D. Howe (1873–1946), American educator, editor, and writer
- William Howe (disambiguation) (1729–1815) British general in the American Revolution
- William B. W. Howe (1823–1894), sixth Bishop of South Carolina in the Episcopal Church

== Fictional characters ==
- Simon Howe, on the soap opera Brookside
- Rebecca Howe, on the sitcom Cheers

== See also ==
- Justice Howe (disambiguation)
- Hao (surname)
- Hau (surname)
- How (surname)
- Howe (disambiguation)
- Howes (disambiguation)
