= Howes =

Howes is an English topographic name and surname. Howes is from the plural of the word howe referring to a barrow originating from the Old Norse word haugr meaning hill, mound or barrow. Howes can refer to:

== People ==
- Alex Howes (born 1988), road racing cyclist
- Alex Howes (footballer) (born 2000), English footballer
- Arthur Howes (1950–2004), documentary film-maker and teacher
- Barbara Howes (1905–1996), American poet
- Bob Howes (born 1943), Canadian football player
- Bobby Howes (1895–1972), English actor
- Brian Howes (born 1965), Canadian musician
- Buster Howes (born 1960), Royal Marines officer
- Carol Howes (born 1984), Zambian footballer
- Christian Howes (disambiguation), several
- Christian Howes (musician) (born 1972), American musician, educator, and composer
- Christopher Howes (born 1942), English academic
- Clifton A. Howes (1860–1936), American philatelist
- Daniel Howes, business columnist and editor
- Dean Howes (born 1952), American Major League Soccer executive
- Dulcie Howes (1908–1993), South African ballet dancer
- Edith Howes (1872–1954), New Zealand teacher and author
- Edmund Howes, an English chronicler
- Edward Howes (1813–1871), English politician
- Frank Howes (1891–1974), chief music critic of The Times in the 1950s and '60s
- George Howes (disambiguation), several
- George Howes (entomologist) (1879–1946), New Zealand entomologist
- Greg Howes (born 1977), American soccer player
- Hetta Howes (born 1990), English scholar of medieval literature
- Howes Brothers, American commercial photography
- Ida Soule Howes (1869–1952), Washington state political and social activist.
- James G. Howes, American businessman
- John Howes (1924–2017), professor
- John Howes (born 1964) Welsh ecologist and environmentalist
- Jonathan Howes (1937–2015), American politician and urban planner
- Justin Howes (1963–2005), British historian
- Kenny Howes (born 1970), American musician
- Larry Howes (born 1947), American politician
- Laura Howes, American scholar
- Paul Howes (born 1981), Australian trade unionists
- Peter Howes (1911–2003), Anglican bishop in Malaysia
- Reed Howes (1900–1964), American model and actor
- Ronald Howes (1926–2010), American inventor
- Royce Howes (1901–1973), journalist and author
- Ruth Howes (born 1944), American physicist
- Sally Ann Howes (1930–2021), English singer and actress
- Scott Howes (born 1987), ice hockey forward
- Thomas Howes (disambiguation), several people
- Tim Howes (born 1963), American computer scientist
- William S. Howes (1926–2000), farmer, municipal secretary, and political figure
- William Washington Howes (1887–1962), assistant Postmaster General

== Places ==
- Howes, Cambridgeshire, a former hamlet in England
- C. G. Howes Dry Cleaning-Carley Real Estate, historic building in Newton, Massachusetts
- Fort Howes, a civilian redoubt
- Howes Building, a historic building in Clinton, Iowa, United States
- Howes (fell), a subsidiary summit of Branstree in the English Lake District, and one of The Outlying Fells of Lakeland
- Howes, Missouri, an unincorporated community
- Howes, South Dakota, community in Meade County, South Dakota, United States
- Sour Howes, small fell in the English Lake District

== Other ==
- Howes Lubricator, manufacturer of oils, fuel additives and lubricants

== See also ==
- Howe (disambiguation)
- Howe (surname)
