= How =

How most often refers to:

- How (greeting), an anglicization of the Lakota word háu
- How, an interrogative word in English grammar

How may also refer to:

== Art and entertainment ==
=== Literature ===
- How (book), 2007, by Dov Seidman
- How?, a book by Indian science writer Sukanya Datta
- HOW (magazine), for graphic designers
- H.O.W. Journal, an American art and literary journal

=== Music ===
- How? (EP), by BoyNextDoor, 2024
- "How?" (song), by John Lennon, 1971
- "How", a song by Clairo from Diary 001, 2018
- "How", a song by the Cranberries from Everybody Else Is Doing It, So Why Can't We?, 1993
- "How", a song by Daughter from Not to Disappear, 2016
- "How", a song by Lil Baby from My Turn, 2020
- "How", a song by Maroon 5 from Hands All Over, 2010
- "How", a song by Regina Spektor from What We Saw from the Cheap Seats, 2012
- "How", a song by Robyn from Robyn Is Here, 1995
- "How", a song by Spooky Tooth from Cross Purpose, 1999

=== Other media ===
- HOW (graffiti artist), Raoul Perre, New York graffiti muralist
- How (TV series), a British children's television show

== People ==
- How (surname)
- HOW (graffiti artist), Raoul Perre, New York graffiti muralist
- Benjamin Chew Howard, reporter of decisions of the US Supreme Court (reports identified by the abbreviation How.)

== Places ==
- How, Cumbria, England
- How, Wisconsin, US
- Howden railway station (station code: HOW), England

== See also ==
- Hao (disambiguation)
- Hau (disambiguation)
- Howe (disambiguation)
- Howe (surname)
