= Anthony Howe =

Anthony Howe may refer to:

- Anthony Howe (historian) (born 1950), British historian
- Anthony Howe (sculptor), American artist

== See also ==
- Howe (surname)
