= Howe =

Howe may refer to:

== People and fictional characters ==
- Howe (surname), including a list of people and fictional characters
- Howe Browne, 2nd Marquess of Sligo (1788–1845), Irish peer and colonial governor

=== Titles ===
- Earl Howe, two titles, an extinct one in the Peerage of Great Britain and an extant one in the Peerage of the United Kingdom
- Howe baronets, two extinct titles in the Baronetage of England

== Places ==
=== Antarctica ===
- Mount Howe, Marie Byrd Land
- Howe Glacier, Queen Maud Mountains

=== Australia ===
- Cape Howe, on the border between New South Wales and Victoria, Australia
- Lord Howe Island, Australia

=== Canada ===
- Howe Sound, British Columbia
- Howe Island, Ontario

=== Germany ===
- Howe, Hamburg

=== United Kingdom ===
- Howe, North Yorkshire, a small village and civil parish
- Howe, Norfolk, a village and civil parish
- Howe, Orkney, a small settlement
- Howe of Fife, a low-lying valley in Scotland

=== United States ===
- Howe, Idaho, an unincorporated community
- Howe, Indiana, an unincorporated census-designated place
- Howe, Minneapolis, a neighborhood in the city of Minneapolis
- Howe, Nebraska, an unincorporated community
- Howe, Oklahoma, a town
- Howe, Pennsylvania, an unincorporated community
- Howe, Texas, a town
- Howe Township (disambiguation)
- Howe Caverns, New York

=== Elsewhere ===
- Île Howe, one of the Kerguelen Islands

== Historic buildings ==
=== United States ===
- Howe House (Cambridge, Massachusetts), on the National Register of Historic Places
- Howe Building, Lowell, Massachusetts, on the National Register of Historic Places
- Howe Barn, Ipswich, Massachusetts, on the National Register of Historic Places
- Howe Tavern (College Corner, Ohio), on the National Register of Historic Places
- Wayside Inn (Sudbury), originally called the Howe Tavern, part of the Wayside Inn Historic District in Sudbury, Massachusetts

=== England ===
- Castle Howe, Kendal, Cumbria

=== Scotland ===
- Maes Howe, Stenness, Orkney
- Mine Howe, Tankerness, Orkney
- The Howe, Stromness, Orkney

== Schools in the United States ==
- Howe High School (disambiguation)
- Howe Military Academy, Howe, Indiana

== Other uses ==
- HMS Howe, several British warships
- Howe & Co, a firm of solicitors in London, England
- A synonym for tumulus, a mound of earth and stones raised over a grave or graves

== See also ==
- How (disambiguation)
- Hau (disambiguation)
- Hao (disambiguation)
