= How (surname) =

How is an English surname, derived either from a contraction of Howe, or from various place names such as How, Cumbria. It may also be a variant spelling of the Chinese surname Hao. Notable people with the surname include:

- Bradford How (born 1977), Canadian video jockey
- Charles T. How (1840–1909), American real-estate developer
- Henry How (1828–1879), British-Canadian chemist, geologist and mineralogist
- James Eads How (1874–1930), American hobo organizer
- Jamie How (born 1981), New Zealand cricketer
- Jane How (born 1951), English actress
- Martin How (1931–2022), British composer and organist
- Richard How (born 1944), Australian rugby union player
- Walter How (1885–1972), English sailor
- William Walsham How (1823–1897), English bishop of Wakefield

== See also ==
- Howe (surname)
- Hao (surname)
