= National Association for the Protection of British Industry and Capital =

The National Association for the Protection of British Industry and Capital was founded in May 1849 by the English shipbuilder and politician George Frederick Young as a pressure group advocating protectionism. The historian Anthony Howe has written that Young "was ready to woo earls, dukes, farmers, seamen, and the Chartist National Association of Organised Trades. He forced Benjamin Disraeli into a defensive position (over his apparently dwindling support for protection) and became for a time a vital force in the protectionist politics of the late 1840s and early 1850s".
