= Jeremy Howe (disambiguation) =

Jeremy Howe (born 1990) is a professional Australian rules footballer playing for the Collingwood Football Club.

Jeremy Howe may also refer to:

- Jeremy Howe (English footballer) (born 1973), English association football player
- Jeremy Howe (radio drama editor), editor of BBC radio drama The Archers
