= William Howe =

William Howe may refer to:

- William Howe, 5th Viscount Howe (1729–1814), British general during American Revolutionary War
- William Howe (architect) (1803–1852), patented Howe truss for covered bridges
- William Howe (mayor) (1864–1952), newspaperman in Victoria, Australia
- William B. W. Howe (1824–1894), Bishop of South Carolina
- William Dean Howe (1916–1982), Canadian Member of Parliament
- William F. Howe (lawyer) (1828–1902), American trial lawyer, founded Howe and Hummel
- William F. Howe (general) (1888–1952), American stockbroker and military leader during World Wars
- William H. Howe (1837–1907), American Union Army soldier during the Civil War and Medal of Honor recipient
- William Henry Howe (1846–1929), American painter
- William T. Howe (1835–1918), farmer and political figure in New Brunswick, Canada
- William Wirt Howe (1833–1909), Justice of the Louisiana Supreme Court
- Bill Howe (1922–2007), baseball player at Yale University
- W. B. W. Howe Jr., (1851-1912), architect, son of the bishop

== See also ==
- Will D. Howe (1873–1946), American educator, editor, and writer
