= Christian Howes =

Christian Howes may refer to:

- Christian Howes (musician) (born 1972), American musician, educator, and composer
- Christian Howes (presenter) (born 1973), part-time TV presenter, public speaker

== See also ==
- Howes (surname)
