= Hao =

Hao or HAO may refer to:

== People ==
- Hao (surname) (Chinese: 郝)
- Hao (given name)
- Hao (video gamer), Chinese professional Dota 2 player
- Heather O'Reilly, Professional soccer player

== Places ==
- Hao (city), or Haojing (鎬京), capital of the Western Zhou, near present-day Xi'an
  - Xi'an, China, derived from the ancient city
- Hao (French Polynesia), an atoll
  - Hao Airport
- Hao Prefecture (濠州), of imperial China
- Hao River, in Thailand
- Butler County Regional Airport IATA code

== Other uses ==
- Art name (Chinese: 號, hào)
- Hakö language, spoken in Papua New Guinea
- hào, a disused monetary subunit of the Vietnamese đồng
- Hao Asakura (麻倉 葉王 (ハオ), Asakura Hao), a fictional character and the main antagonist in the manga and anime Shaman King
- High Altitude Observatory
- High Armanen Order
- Rauvolfia sandwicensis (Hawaiian: hao), a flowering plant
- Hydroxylamine oxidoreductase, an enzyme involved in the nitrogen cycle

== See also ==
- Hau (disambiguation)
- How (disambiguation)
- Howe (disambiguation)
