= Thomas Howe =

Thomas Howe may refer to:

- Thomas Marshall Howe (1808–1877), Whig member of the U.S. House of Representatives from Pennsylvania
- Thomas Y. Howe Jr. (1808–1860), U.S. Representative from New York
- Thomas Howe (runner) (born 1944), Liberian Olympic athlete
- Thomas Carr Howe Jr. (1904–1994), one of the monuments men involved in the recovery of art looted by the Nazis during the Second World War

== See also ==
- Thomas Howes (disambiguation)
