= The Drayton House =

Historic house in Charleston, South Carolina, US

Coordinates: 32.7719°N 79.9280°W

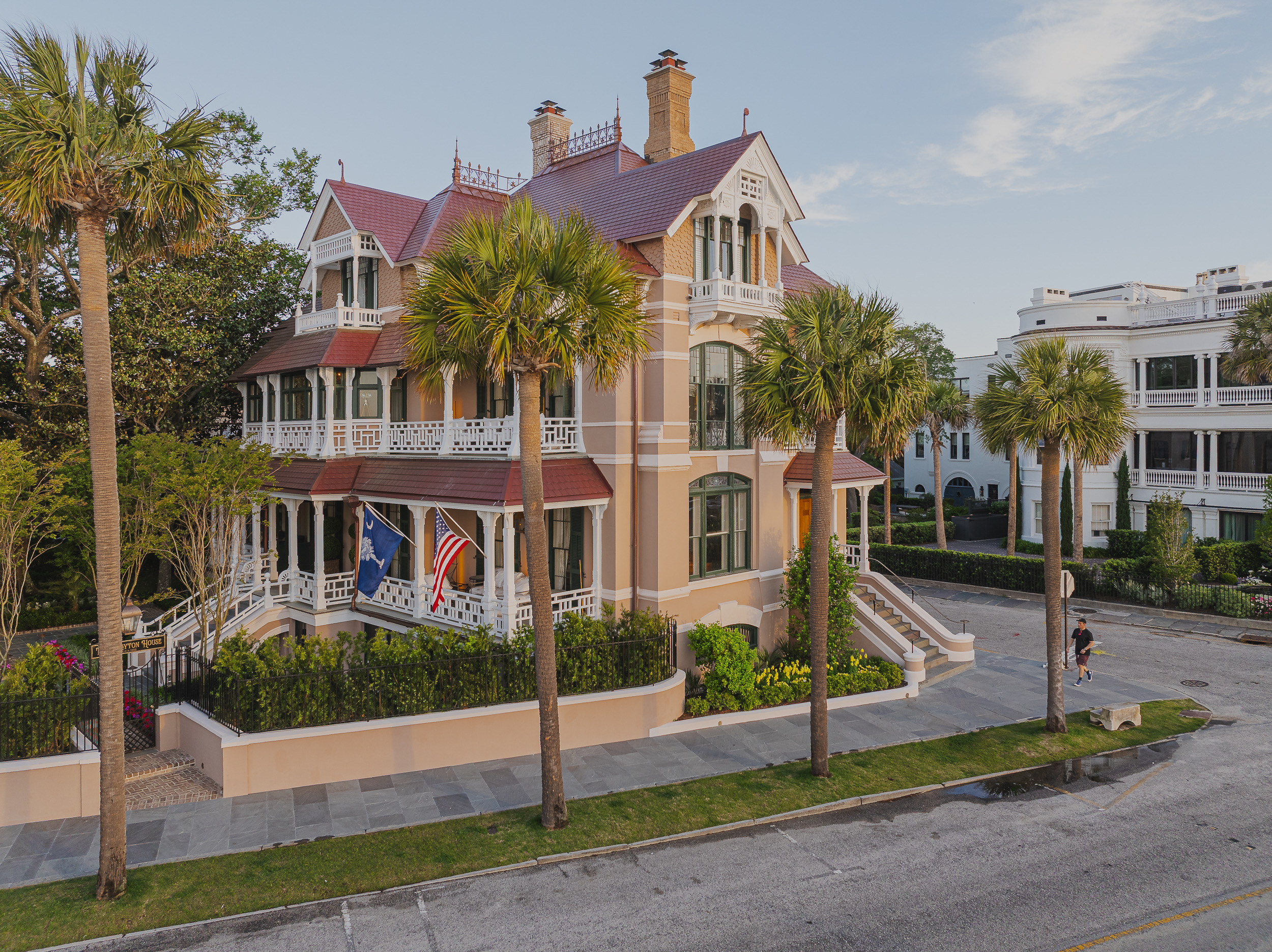

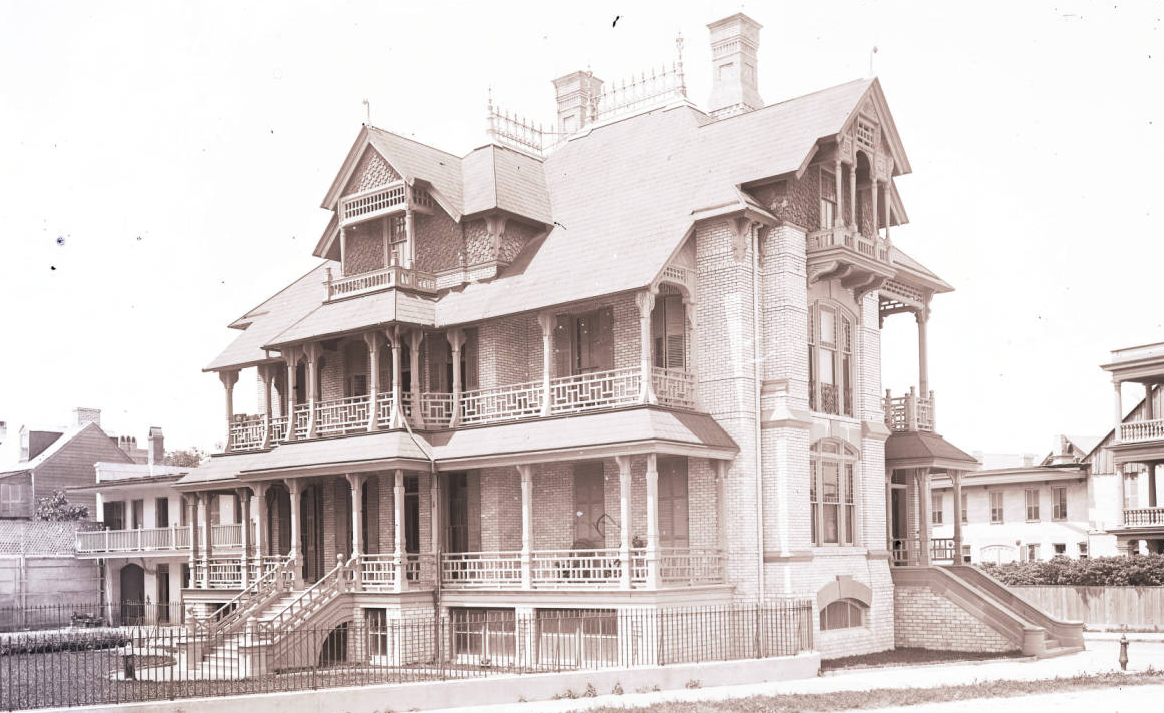
Figure 1 - When photographed by George LaGrange Cook in about 1890, the house had not yet been stuccoed

The Drayton House is a historic Victorian-era dwelling at 25 East Battery, Charleston, South Carolina, United States. It was completed in 1885 for Eliza Gantt Drayton and Charles H. Drayton and designed by W.B.W. Howe, Jr.

The location of the house was the former site of a c.1830 Greek Revival-style dwelling, which was destroyed in the Civil War. The Drayton House was built atop the foundation of the former dwelling, and erected with white brick and black mortar with elements of Queen Anne architecture and Eastlake detailing.

== Colonial Fortifications: Early History Of The Lot ==
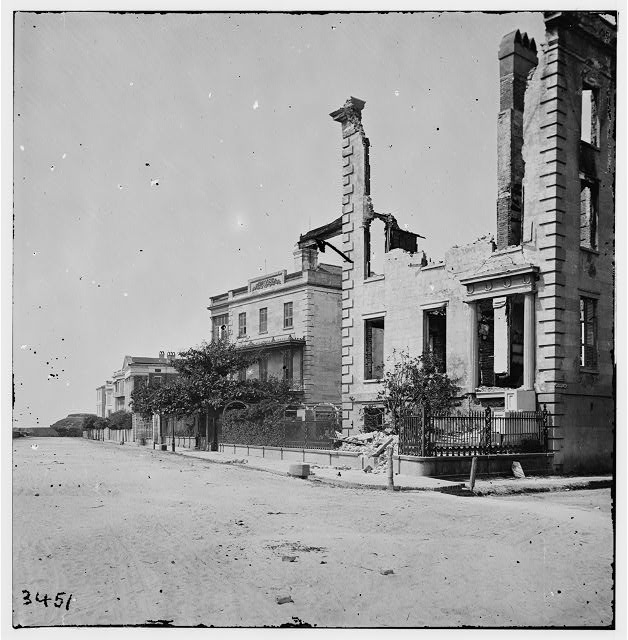
Figure 2 - 1865 photo of the former dwelling (Library of Congress)

The property now occupied by the Drayton House first consisted of public marshland, as was much of the southeastern perimeter of the peninsula, and bounded to the west by narrow waterfront lots that extended from Church Street. With its access to the harbor, however, the land eventually became a strategic location for defensive fortifications during the colonial period. The property’s southern perimeter was occupied by military batteries and fortifications from 1756 through the War of 1812. After the War of 1812 and threats of foreign attacks diminished, the last fortification to occupy the area was demolished. The large property once occupied by the fortifications soon went on the market for purchase as unique waterfront lots for the city’s wealthiest residents on a street named for its former use: East Battery.

== The First Mansion ==
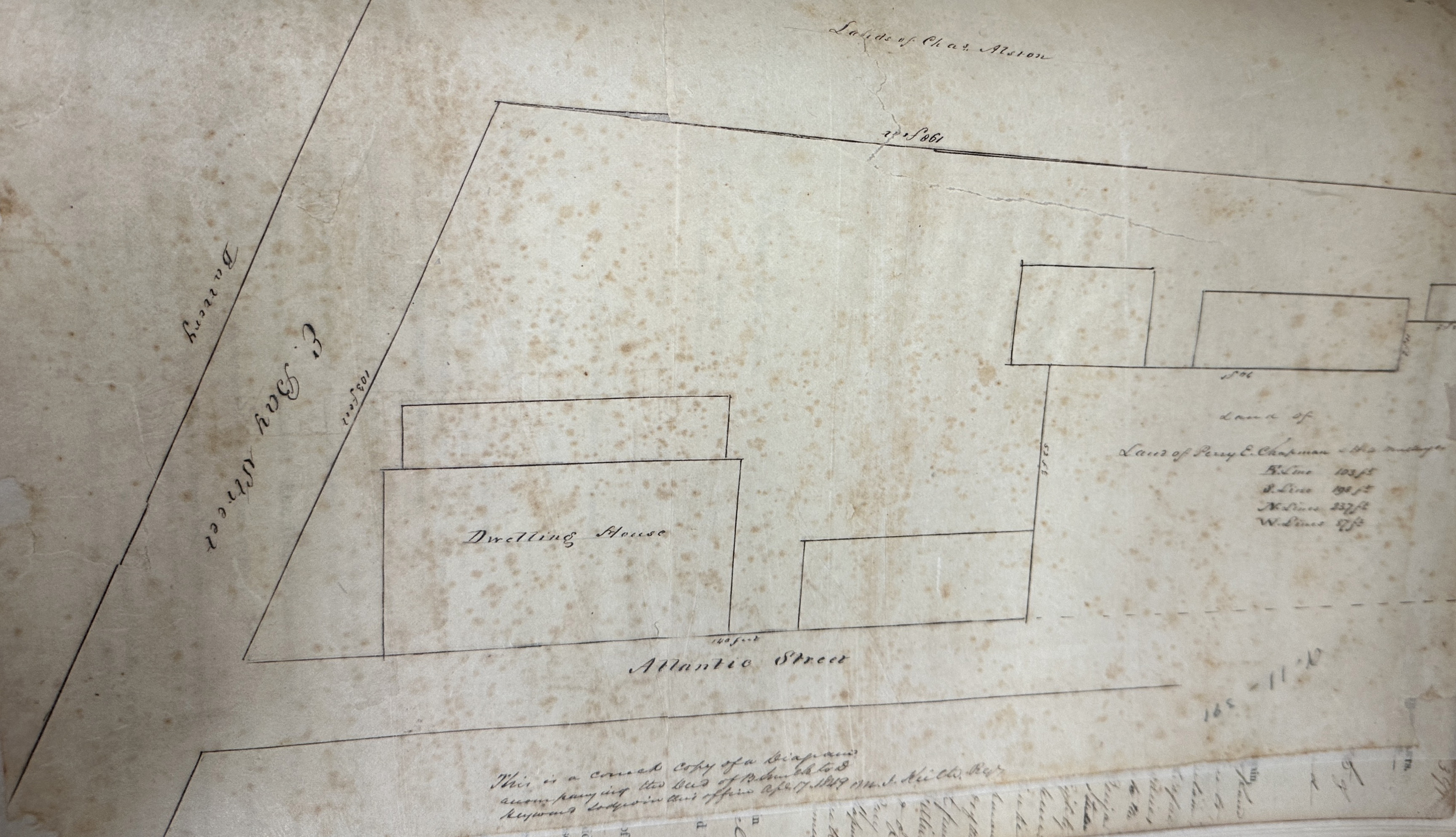
Figure 3 - 1849 Plat of the property

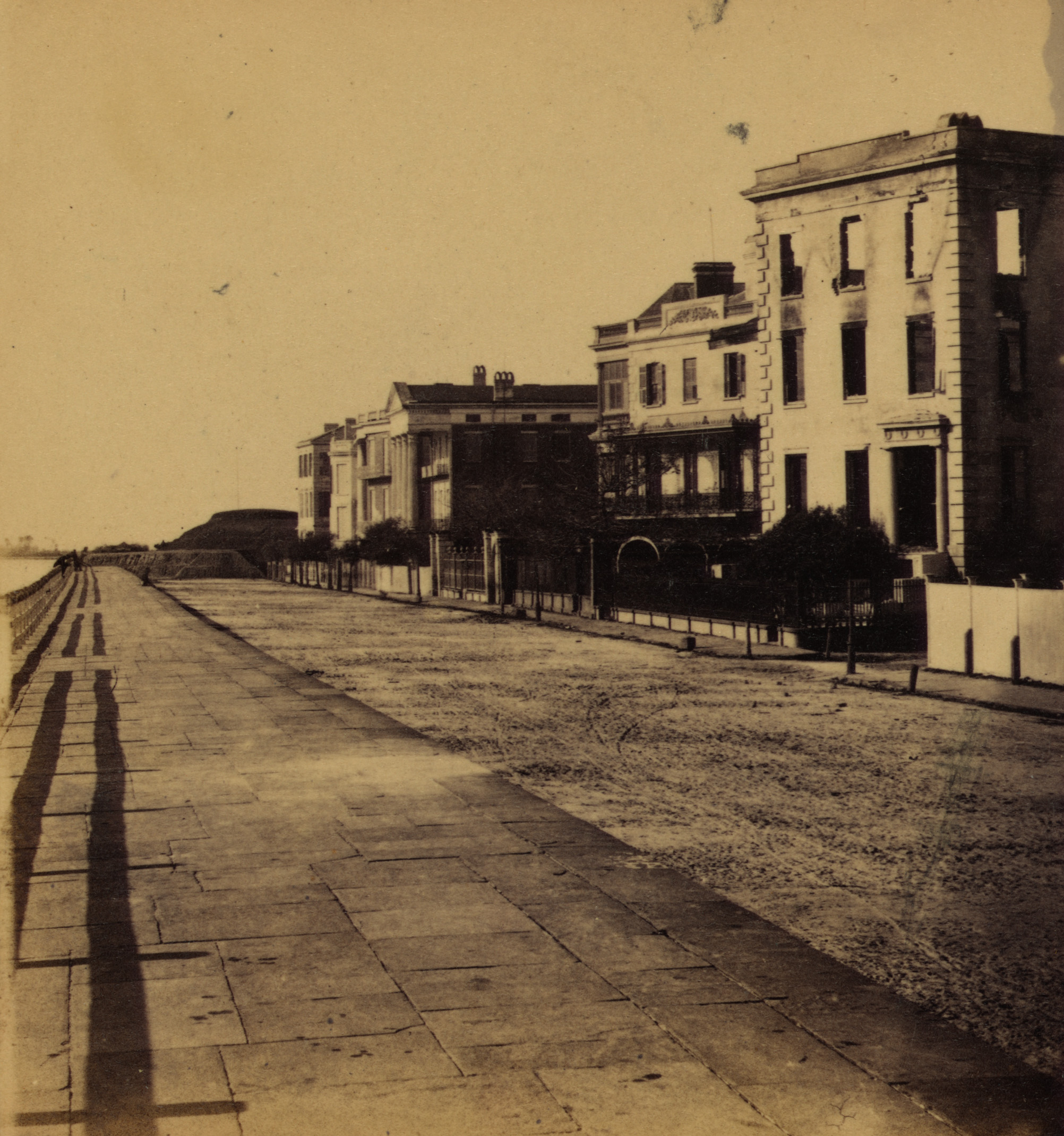
Figure 4 - April 1865 after the Civil War; Heyward's dwelling (gutted) is on the right

By 1830, planter Benjamin Smith (1789-1851) built a large three-story brick mansion facing east over the Charleston Harbor as well as a two-story outbuilding along Atlantic Street, a tack house, and stables. The East Battery dwelling was likely used by the Smith family seasonally, as they likely split their time between downtown during the social seasons and their many plantations. In February of 1849, Smith sold the mansion and outbuildings to Daniel Heyward (1810-1888), one of the city’s wealthiest planters (Figure 3). Photographs of East Battery in April of 1865 confirm that the dwelling sustained devastating damage, such as a collapsed roof and gutted interior, during the Civil War (Figure 4). By late 1865, the entire front elevation had crumbled. For nearly twenty years, the house remained in ruins.

In November of 1883, Heyward sold the property to Eliza Merriett Gantt Drayton (1849-1926). Eliza Drayton was married to fertilizer executive Charles Henry Drayton (1847-1915), a distant cousin of Heyward, and purchased the property to establish an urban seat for their growing family. Charles Henry Drayton, known as “Phosphate Charlie” in Drayton Hall records and a veteran of the Confederate Army, was born into an old Charleston family who amassed significant wealth through plantation management, rice cultivation, and enslaved labor since the late seventeenth century. The family seat of Drayton Hall, commissioned by his great-grandfather John Drayton in the late 1730s, is considered one of the earliest and best examples of Palladian architecture erected in the American colonies and survives today as a National Historic Landmark. At the age of five, Charles Drayton inherited a share of Drayton Hall when his father, Dr. Charles Drayton III (1814-1852), died in 1852. By this time, Charles Drayton established a lucrative phosphate mine at Drayton Hall and founded Charles H. Drayton & Co., which oversaw the mining and processing of phosphate rock on the property and managed its distribution at Charleston’s port.

On January 29th, 1885, the News & Courier confirmed that a “handsome residence” was under construction on the Drayton family’s East Battery property and was set to be completed by May of that year. The Drayton House would soon become one of many “phosphate mansions” erected and renovated with money garnered from phosphate mining, which spurred a city-wide building boom between 1881 and 1885. To physically construct the new dwelling, Eliza and Charles Drayton hired local English contractor Henry Lloyd Cade (1836-1899). The dwelling’s carpentry work was completed by John D. Murphy (1844-1900), whose initials were found on a piece of wooden trim during a renovation in 2024. Both Cade and Murphy executed designs drawn by engineer William Bell White Howe, Jr. (1851-1912), the son of Episcopal Bishop and rector of St Philip's Church William Bell White Howe (1823-1894).

By mid 1885, one of the city’s finest Victorian-era dwellings emerged from the ruins of Smith’s former East Battery mansion. Built of white brick from the local Stoney Brick Company and pointed with black mortar, the Drayton House was erected directly on top of Smith’s hand-made red/gray brick foundation, as indicated by exposed brick courses within the Drayton House basement. Despite adopting the former footprint, the Drayton House was unique in style, detail, and material. In addition to featuring white brick with black mortar, the new East Battery mansion was built in Eastlake design, a popular ornamental aesthetic in America during the Victorian era and a derivative of the late-nineteenth-century Queen Anne architectural movement. While the exterior appears much as it did at the time of its construction, with the exception of the added stucco, most of the dwelling’s interior Vicrtorian-era detailing were removed during a 1970s renovation. The 1830s tack house, stables, and two-story outbuilding remained and were reused by the Drayton family.

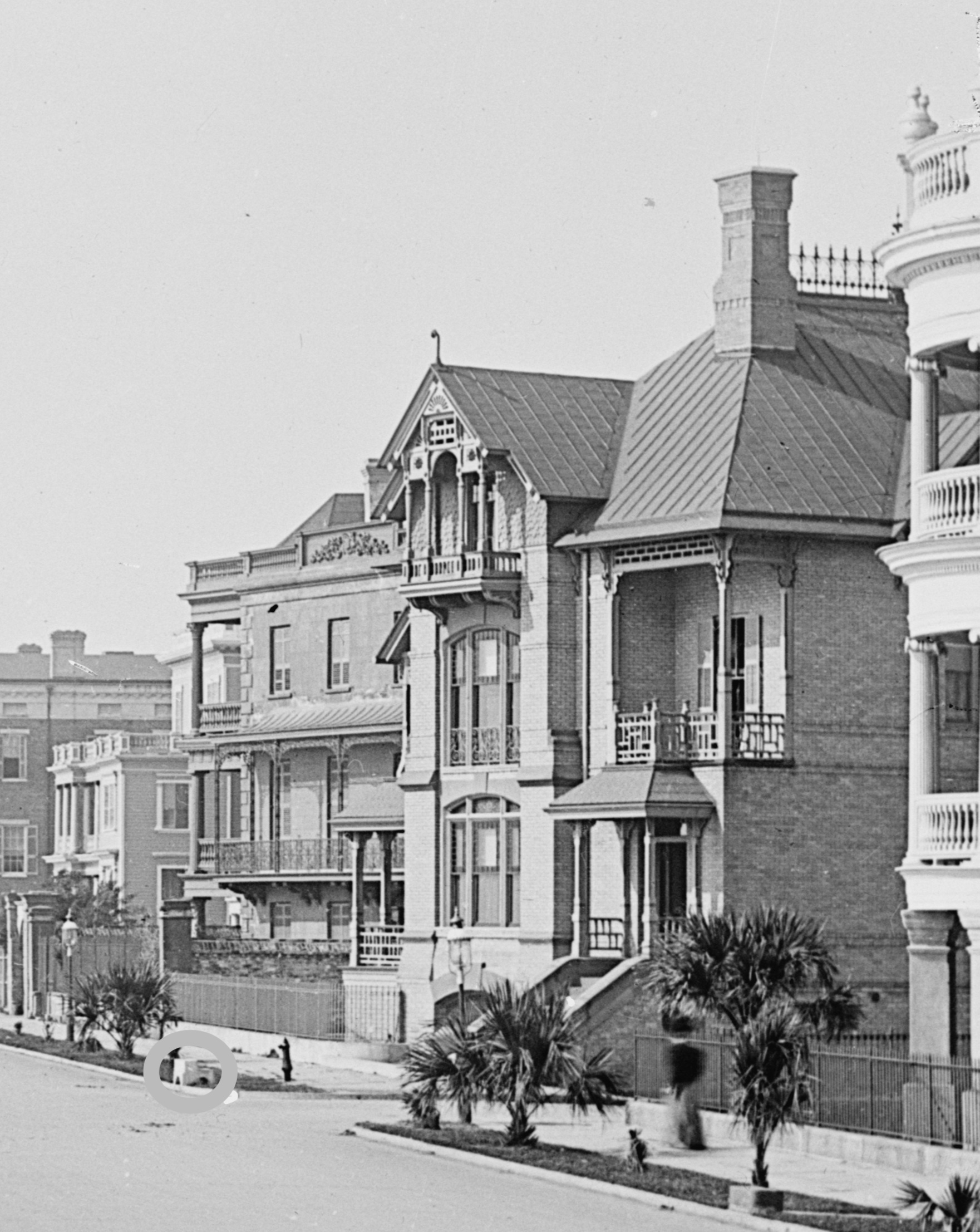
Figure 5 - One of the first in the city to be illuminated by electricity.

At its completion, it is possible that the Drayton House was one of the first in the city to be illuminated by electricity, which was available to Charleston’s wealthiest citizens by the late 1880s. Four years later, the Drayton House was photographed for a city-sponsored promotional publication highlighting the innovation and progress of Charleston’s industries and modern residences, further suggesting the dwelling was pioneering in its engineering (Figure 5).

== The Drayton House ==
Eliza and Charles Drayton officially moved into the Drayton House by late 1885 with their young daughters: Mary “May” Middleton Drayton (1874-1899), Eliza “Bessie” Drayton (1878-1918), Charlotta Drayton (1884-1969) (Figure 24). A son, Charles Henry Drayton, Jr. (1887-1941), would shortly arrive by 1887. The Drayton family retained ownership of the Drayton House for over eighty years, spending most of the year in the new waterfront residence, summering in the mountains of Flat Rock, North Carolina, and escaping for a few months to Drayton Hall on the Ashley River.

When the family was at the Drayton House, a small staff of domestic servants lived in the two-story outbuilding while working on the property. Many of the property’s first employees were likely descendants of those enslaved under the Drayton family before the Civil War. Staff in the late 1880s included Benjamin Bailey, who worked as a coachman for the family until 1891, and David Mitchell, who began working as a waiter and butler for the Drayton family shortly after the Drayton House’s construction. By 1900, staff of the Drayton House included three Black servants: cook Susan Simmons (1840-1907), maid and nurse Charity “Mammy” Ross Berry (c.1852-1907), and William (also referred to as “Frank W.” in city directories) McCall (c. 1858-1908), a coachman.

Following her father’s death in 1915 and her mother’s in 1926, Charlotta Drayton maintained a residency at the Drayton House, Drayton Hall, and family property in Flat Rock until her death in the 1960s. After World War II, Charlotta rented the first floor of the dwelling to friend and director of the Charleston Museum Edward Milby Burton (1898-1977) and his wife Sally Morris Pinckney Burton (1896-1989), who remained in the dwelling for the next twenty years.

== End Of The Drayton Era ==
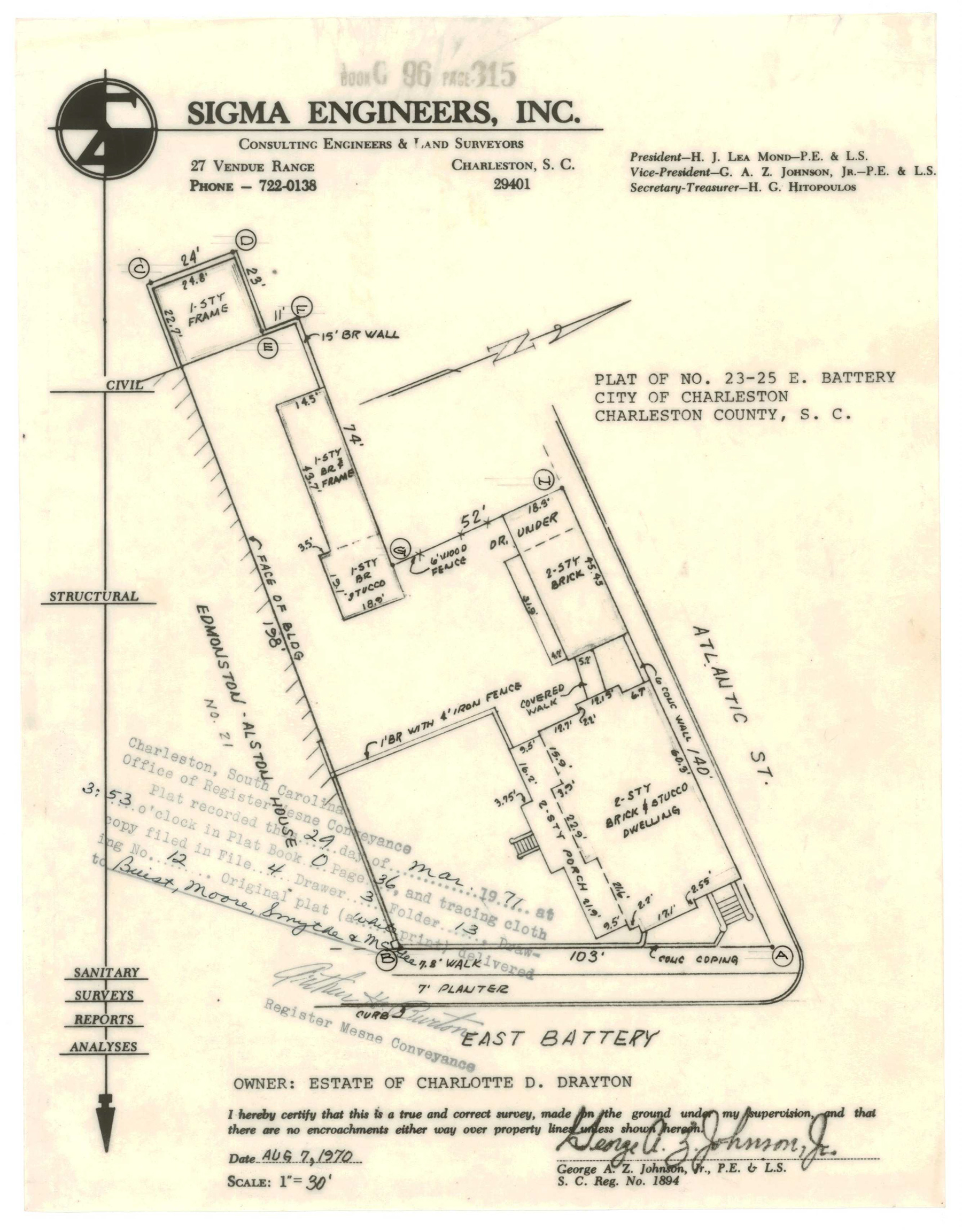
Figure 6 - 1970 plat of 25 East Battery

On September 4, 1969, the dwelling’s final and longest Drayton family resident died of congestive heart failure at the age of 84 (Figure 6). Upon Charlotta Drayton’s death, several Drayton family heirlooms and antiques were found in the Drayton House attic. Among many significant pieces of eighteenth-century furniture were forty-eight watercolors by famed eighteenth-century artist and naturalist George Edwards (1694-1773) that were initially purchased by John Drayton (c. 1715-1779) in 1733. The paintings are now part of the Drayton Hall Preservation Trust collection.

After her death, the Drayton House was sold to Charles H. Woodward (1904-1986), his wife Elizabeth “Betty” Gadsden Woodward (1912-2004), and Elizabeth’s sister Mary Deas Gadsden Maybank (1916-1980). Charles and Betty Woodward were well-known preservation advocates who invested heavily in national and local preservation missions. During their ownership of the Drayton House, Charles and Betty Woodward became key financial sponsors of Charleston’s most important urban planning projects of the 1970s and 1980s, including Waterfront Park.

== Modern Renovations ==
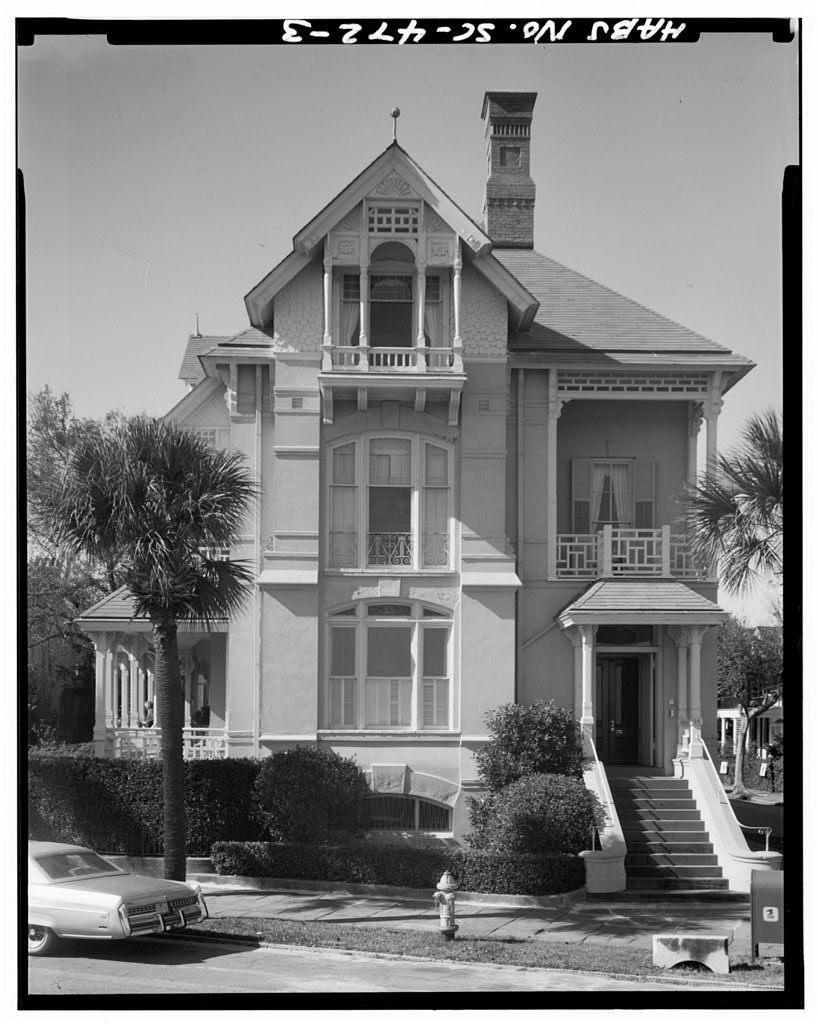
Figure 7 - 1980

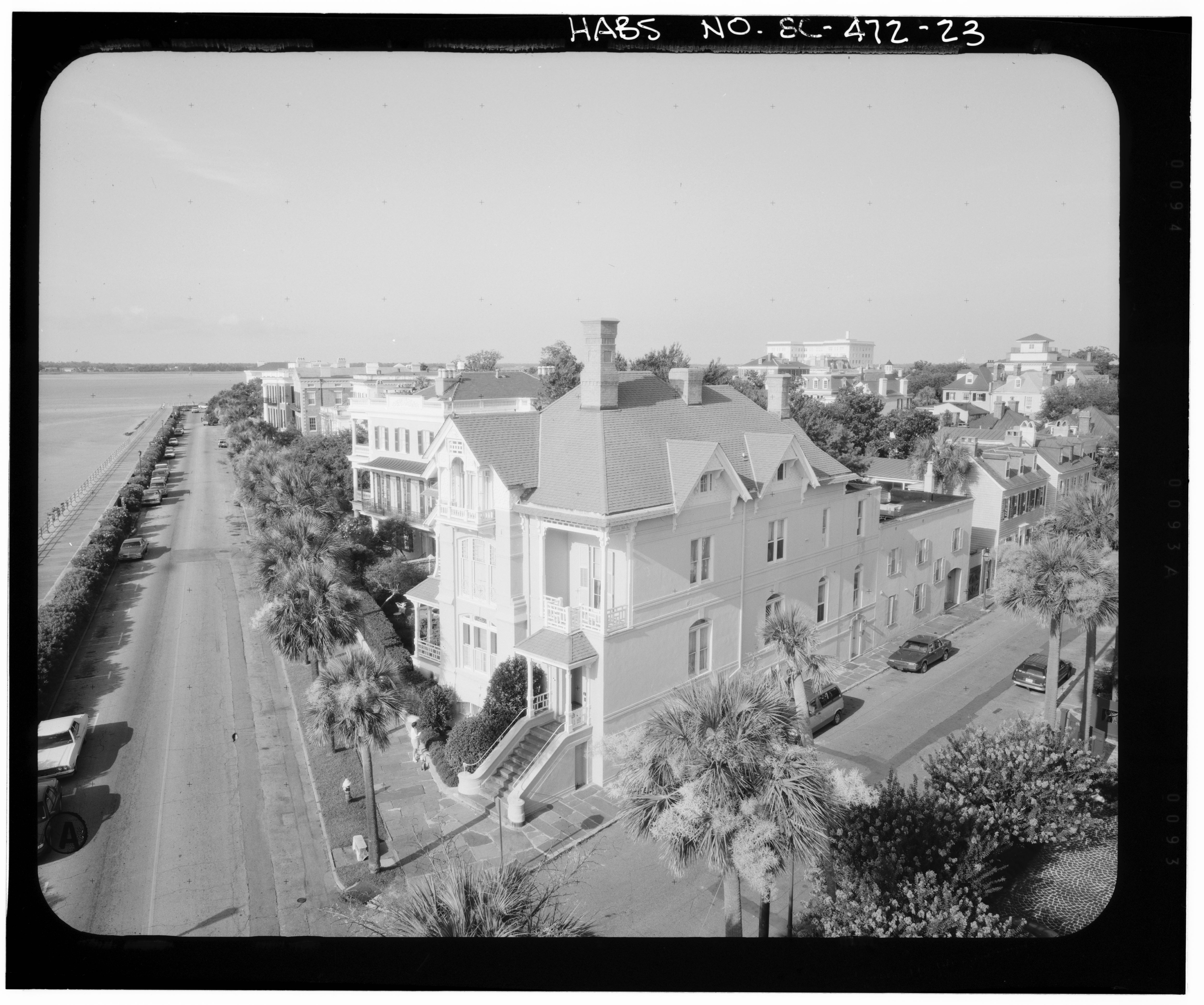
Figure 8 - 1980 Aerial

The new owners planned to retain the dwelling’s first and second-story apartments established by Charlotta while drastically renovating the interior historic fabric and constructing a rear addition. To complete the work, they hired well-known Black contractor Herbert DeCosta, Jr. of H.A. Decosta, Co. Plans were made to renovate the dwelling’s original Victorian-era entrance foyer, which was clad in dark natural woods with large fixtures and a bold staircase. Work included removing the staircase and replacing it with one reflective of the Chinese Chippendale style, telling the News & Courier it was “in keeping with the exterior piazza railings.” They also painted the woodwork white and installed French doors with etched glass that led into the drawing room. In the formal rooms, original mantelpieces were replaced with those salvaged from Spring White Plantation, one of several properties submerged for the damming of the Santee River. The rear piazzas were enclosed with glass panes, and the attic was refinished. A three-story hyphen was erected to connect the main dwelling with the outbuilding, and a new elevator was installed, which required infilling original exterior windows in both historic structures. They also established guest quarters in the rear outbuilding and filled the original carriage archway on the first floor to create a private single-door entry for the unit along Atlantic Street. Photographs taken shortly after this work confirm that the stained glass from the first-floor bay at the East Bay facade was removed, and the door beneath the entrance stairs had also been infilled (Figures 7-8).

In 1999, Betty Woodward sold the Drayton House for $1,550,000 to philanthropist and civic advocate Reba Kinne Huge, who made several other cosmetic changes and restored the property’s antebellum tack house and stables. In August of 2022, the property was sold to Mark W. Jordan and Kimberly M. Hopkins for $6,900,000 in 2022. Four months later, the Drayton House was sold to current owners Robert and Julie Honeycutt, who underwent an extensive 2-1/2 year restoration and renovation of the entire property.
