= Judge Howe =

Judge Howe may refer to:

- Harland Bradley Howe (1873–1946), judge of the United States District Court for the District of Vermont
- James Henry Howe (1827–1893), judge of the United States District Court for the Eastern District of Wisconsin

== See also ==
- Justice Howe (disambiguation)
