= Hau =

Hau or HAU may refer to:

== People and characters ==
- Hau, a character in Pokémon Sun and Moon
- Hau (mythology), a Polynesian wind god
- Hau (surname)
- Hau Latukefu (AKA Hau, born 1976), Australian hip hop musician and radio host

== Places ==
- Hậu River, Vietnamese name for the Bassac River
- Haugesund Airport, Karmøy, in Norway

== Universities ==
- Chaudhary Charan Singh Haryana Agricultural University, India
- Holy Angel University, in Angeles City, Philippines
- Hunan Agricultural University, in Changsha, Hunan, China

== Other uses ==
- Haemagglutinating unit (hau), a measure of Phytohaemagglutinin
- Hau, a superunit of the Tongan paʻanga currency
- Hau, ISO 639-2 code for the Hausa language
- Hau (sociology)
- HAU: Journal of Ethnographic Theory
- Hebbel am Ufer, or HAU, a German theatre company and performance centre in Berlin
- Hebrew Actors' Union, United States
- Hibiscus tiliaceus (Hawaiian: hau), a tree

== See also ==
- Hao (disambiguation)
- How (disambiguation)
- Howe (disambiguation)
