= John Howes =

Canadian academic

John Forman Howes
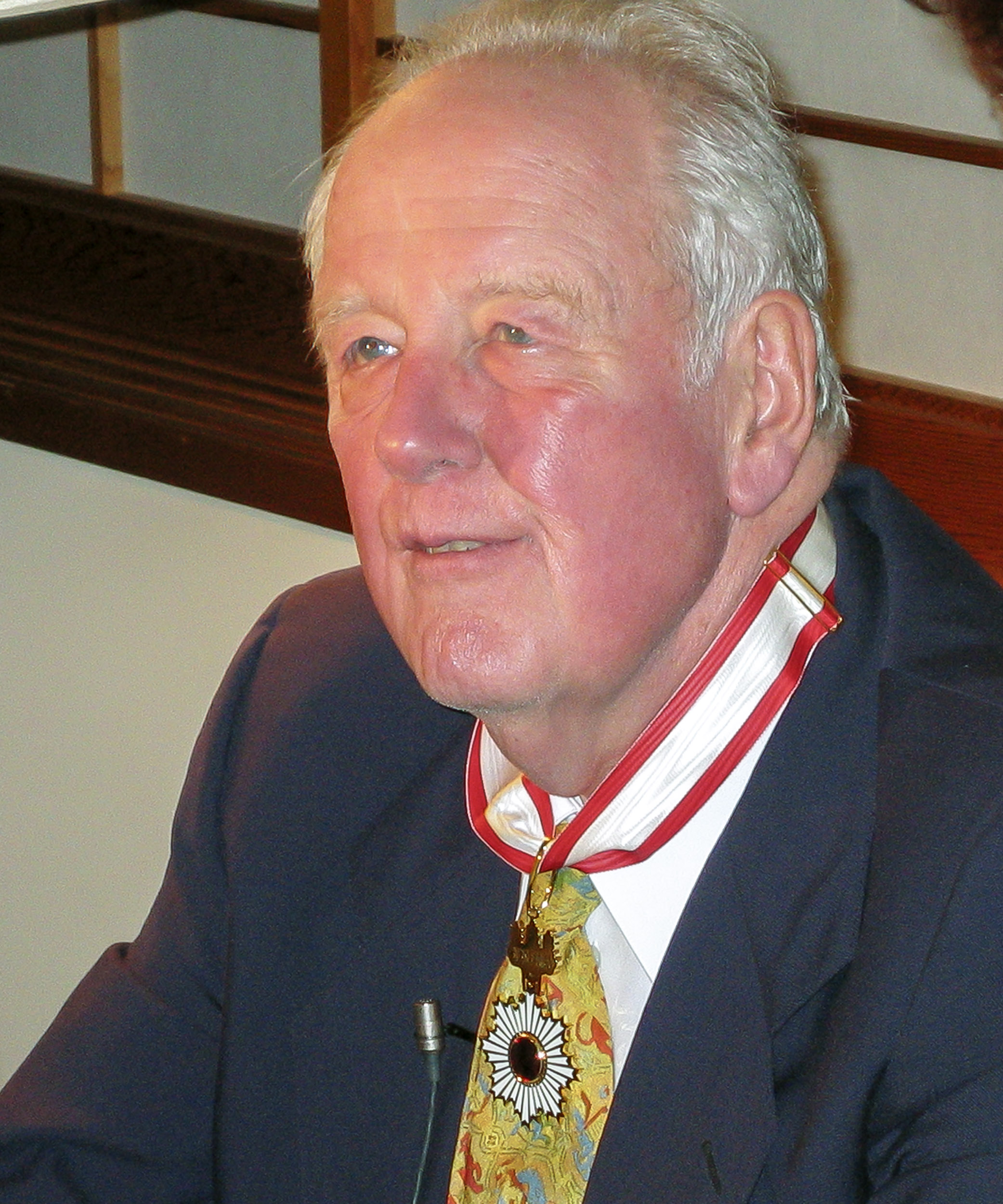
- Prof. John Howes at the Conferment of Decoration by the Government of Japan in 2003
- Born: June 19, 1924; Chicago, Illinois, U.S.
- Died: February 4, 2017 (aged 92); Richmond, British Columbia, Canada
- Occupations: Professor of Japanese Studies (University of British Columbia), Obirin University (Tokyo)

John Forman Howes (June 19, 1924 – February 4, 2017) was a Professor of Asian Studies at the University of British Columbia (UBC) for over three decades.

== Biography ==
Howes began his studies of the Japanese language in 1944 at the I.T.S. Naval School of Oriental Languages, and served as a translator in the general headquarters of the Supreme Commander for the Allied Powers Occupation of Japan. Returning to the United States, he obtained an undergraduate degree at Oberlin College, and then an MA from Columbia University with a thesis entitled "Uchimura Kanzō; a biographical sketch", followed by a 1965 Ph.D. for "Japan's enigma, the young Uchimura Kanzō". Even before completing his doctoral work, in 1961, he joined the Department of Asian Studies at the University of British Columbia, rising to the rank of Professor, and then Emeritus Professor. After retirement from UBC, he taught at Obirin University, near Tokyo.

== Academic work ==
Howes was a specialist in modern Japanese intellectual history, concentrating on its Christian and pacifist thinkers, particularly Uchimura Kanzō (1861–1930) and Nitobe Inazō (1862–1933).

He published the following books:

- Japan's Modern Prophet: Uchimura Kanzō, 1861-1930. Vancouver: University of British Columbia Press, 2005. According to WorldCat, the book is held in 600 libraries.
- (editor) Nitobe Inazô: Japan's Bridge Across the Pacific. Boulder: Westview Press, 1995.
- (with Nobuya Bamba) Pacifism in Japan: The Christian and Socialist Tradition (Vancouver: UBC Press and Kyoto: Minerva Press, 1978). According to WorldCat, the book is held in 498 libraries
- Tradition in Transition, The Modernization of Japan (New York: Macmillan, 1975),
- Japanese Religion in the Meiji Era (Tokyo: Ministry of Education, 1956).

He also edited two volumes for the Japan Foundation: the 1983 Directory of Japan Specialists in Canada and Japan Studies in Canada, 1987.

== Community work ==
In 2003, Howes was awarded the Order of the Rising Sun by the Emperor of Japan for his contributions to the Canada-Japan community.
