= Josias Howe =

Josias Howe (c.1611 – 28 August 1701) was an English divine. He was the son of Thomas Howe, rector of Grendon-Underwood, Buckinghamshire. Howe told Aubrey that Shakespeare took his idea of Dogberry from a constable of Grendon. He was elected scholar of Trinity College, Oxford, on 12 June 1632, and graduated B.A. on 18 June 1634, M.A. in 1638. On 26 May 1637 he was chosen fellow of his college. A sermon which he delivered before the king at Christ Church, Oxford on Psalm iv. 7 was, it is said, ordered by Charles to be printed about 1644 in red at Lichfield's press at Oxford. Only thirty copies are supposed to have been printed, probably without a title-page.

Hearne, who purchased a copy at the sale of Arthur Charlett's library on 14 January 1723, gave an account of it in his edition of Robert of Gloucester's Chronicle. Howe's preaching before the court at Oxford was much admired, and on 10 July 1646 he was created B.D. Howe was removed from his fellowship by the parliamentary visitors in 1648 for 'non-appearance', but was restored in 1660, and died in college on 28 August 1701. He has commendatory verses before the Works of Thomas Randolph (1638), the first folio of Francis Beaumont and John Fletcher entitled Comedies and Tragedies (1647), and the Comedies, Tragicomedies, and other Poems of William Cartwright (1651).
