= George Howes =

George Howes may refer to:

- George Howes (footballer) (1906–1993), English footballer
- George Howes (entomologist) (1879–1946), New Zealand entomologist and businessman
- George Howes (Vermont Treasurer) (1814–1892), Vermont businessman and political figure
- George Bond Howes (1853–1905), English zoologist
