= Edward Gardiner Howe =

American educator born 1849

Edward Gardiner Howe (1849–1931) was an American educator and author.

== Life and career ==
Howe was born in 1849 in Brookfield, Massachusetts. His family relocated to Chicago after several failed business ventures and eventually lost two properties, a farm and a family home, during the Great Chicago Fire in 1871.

Howe returned to Massachusetts and studied at the Massachusetts Agricultural College in the early 1870s. He then became a science teacher and tutor for upper-class families such as the Burnhams and the Armors. He also authored two books about science education entitled Scientific Thinking.

Howe was so beloved by the families of his pupils that they funded a year's sabbatical for his mental health in 1889. He spent this year doing geological research and resting in Portugal. He returned to teach in Chicago for several years before becoming principle of the University of Illinois Preparatory School in 1893. During his work as a private educator and as a principle, Howe invented the idea of field trips for science classes, a component of most modern primary and high school science courses today. He married fellow teacher Mary Elizabeth Barnard in 1881, and died in 1931.

== Published books ==
- Systematic science teaching: A manual of inductive elementary work for all instructors (1894)
- Advanced elementary science; being part II of Systematic science teaching, a manual of inductive elementary work (1900)
