= HMS Howe =

Several ships of the Royal Navy have been named HMS Howe, after Admiral Richard Howe:

- HMS Howe (1805) was the ex-Indian merchantman Kaikusroo; renamed to Dromedary in 1806 and sold in Bermuda in 1864 after many years service as a prison hulk.
- HMS Howe (1815) was a 120 gun ship of the line, built in 1815 and broken up in 1854.
- HMS Howe (1860), launched 1860, was a 121-gun steam line-of-battle ship, renamed Bulwark, and then renamed Impregnable in 1886.
- HMS Howe (1885), launched 1885, was an Admiral-class battleship.
- HMS Howe (1916), a proposed Admiral-class battlecruiser, was laid down in 1916 and cancelled in 1917.
- HMS Howe (32), launched 1940, was a King George V-class battleship.

== Battle honours ==
Ships named Howe have earned the following battle honours: (Note: In the Royal Navy, and other Commonwealth navies that follow the traditions of the RN, battle honours awarded to a ship are inherited by subsequent ships to bear the same name, and are displayed on the ship's honours board.)

- Arctic, 1942−43
- Sicily, 1943
- Okinawa, 1945

== See also ==
- HM hired armed ship Howe, a hired armed vessel wrecked on the south coast of the Isle of Wight in March 1780.
