= Hetta Howes =

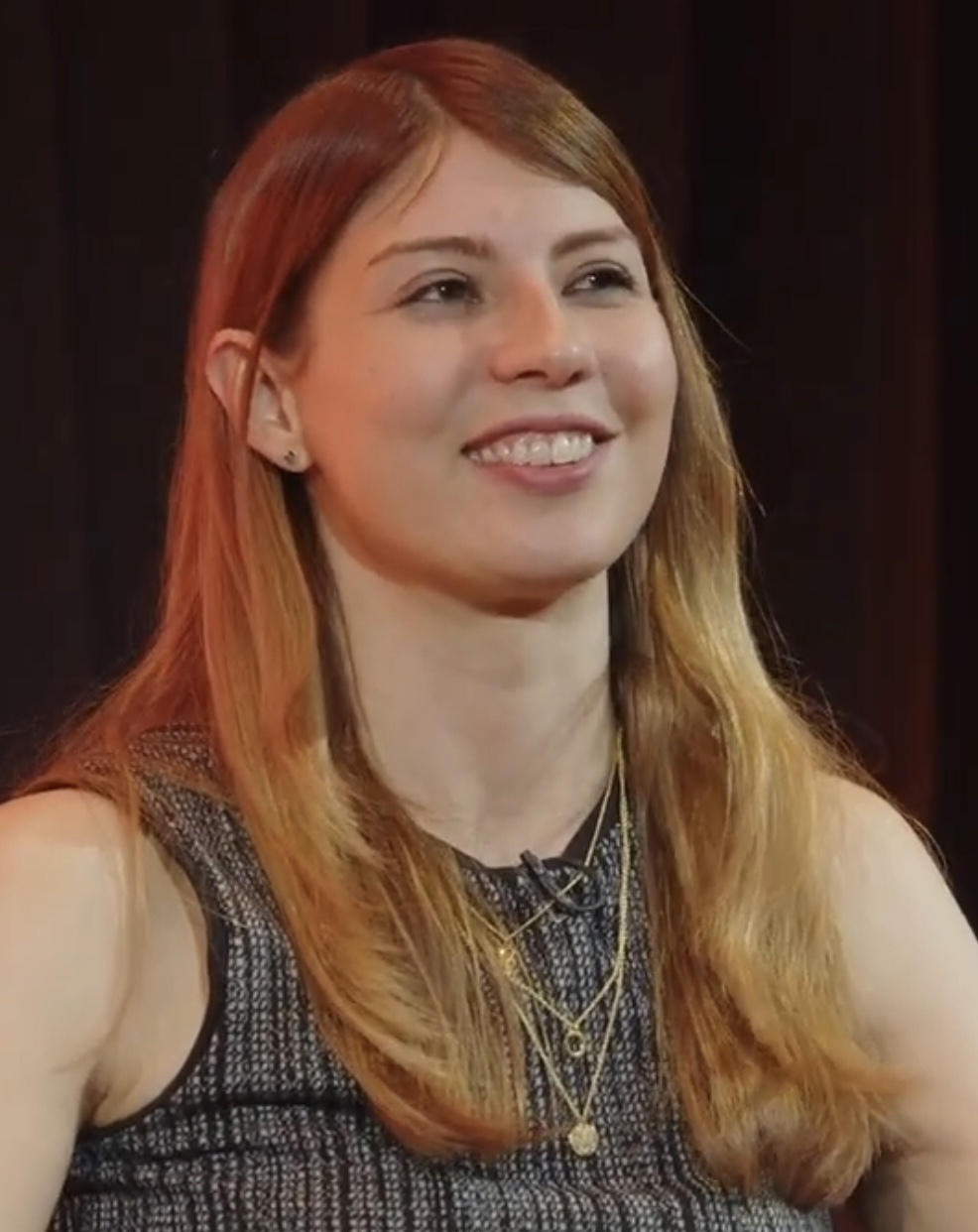
- Howes at the British Library in 2024
- Born: Harriet Elizabeth Howes; 8 June 1990 (age 36)
- Other name: Hetta Elizabeth Howes
- Education: Newnham College, Cambridge; Queen Mary University of London
- Years active: 2016–present
- Children: 1

Harriet Elizabeth Howes (born 8 June 1990) is an English scholar of medieval and early modern literature. She is a senior lecturer at City, University of London and previously lectured at Queen Mary University of London. She is best known for her book Poet, Mystic, Widow, Wife: The Extraordinary Lives of Medieval Women (2024).

== Early life and education ==
Howes grew up in Skipton, North Yorkshire. She also spent time in Scarborough, where she has extended family. Howes attended Skipton Girls' High School.

Howes graduated with a Bachelor of Arts (BA) in English literature in 2011 and a Master of Philosophy (MPhil) in Medieval Literature in 2012, both from Newnham College, Cambridge. She subsequently won a scholarship to pursue a PhD at Queen Mary University of London. She completed her PhD thesis titled "In Search of Clearer Water: an exploration of water imagery in late medieval devotional prose addressed to women" in 2016.

== Career ==
Howes began her career as a lecturer in Medieval Literature and Fellow at Queen Mary University of London. She was also a teaching associate at Royal Holloway, University of London. In 2017, Howes joined City University of London, where she serves as Senior Lecturer in Medieval and Early Modern Literature and a director of the BA English programme. She describes her research as interdisciplinary.

Also in 2017, Howes was selected for the BBC New Generation Thinkers, a scheme dedicated to early career academics in broadcasting. Through this, she began contributing to a number of BBC Radio 3 and Radio 4 programmes. She was commissioned by the Wellcome Trust and Queen Mary to host the eight-episode podcast Spaces of Solitude (2020). An episode titled "The Mind" won a Lovie Award. Howes also contributed articles to publications including The Times Literary Supplement, BBC History and The Telegraph.

Howes converted her PhD thesis into an academic monograph book titled Transformative Waters in Late-medieval Literature: From Aelred of Rievaulx to the Book of Margery Kempe. It was published in 2021 via Boydell & Brewer.

Via a three-way auction in October 2022, Bloomsbury Continuum acquired the rights to publish Howes' trade book Poet, Mystic, Widow, Wife: The Extraordinary Lives of Medieval Women in October 2024. It also had a U.S. release in December. The book profiles the late medieval writers Marie de France, Julian of Norwich, Christine de Pizan, and Margery Kempe. The book covers various aspects of their lives, writing and accounts. Howes supplements gaps in biographical knowledge with stories of other women such as Jeanne de Clisson and Christina of Markyate. Howes took part in Eleanor Jackson's Medieval Women: In Their Own Words exhibition at the British Library.

== Personal life ==
Howes had a daughter while writing Poet, Mystic, Widow, Wife.

== Bibliography ==
=== Books ===
- Transformative Waters in Late-medieval Literature: From Aelred of Rievaulx to the Book of Margery Kempe. Cambridge: Boydell & Brewer. 2021. ISBN 978-1-84384-612-3.
- Poet, Mystic, Widow, Wife: The Extraordinary Lives of Medieval Women. Bloomsbury Continuum. 24 October 2024. ISBN 978-1-39940-869-1.

=== Chapters ===
- "'Adreynt in shennesse': Blood, Shame and Contrition in ‘Quis est iste qui uenit de Edom?'" in Middle English Lyrics: New Readings of Short Poems (2018), edited by Julia Boffey and Christiania Whitehead
