= Howe Township =

Howe Township may refer to:

- Howe Township, Forest County, Pennsylvania
- Howe Township, Perry County, Pennsylvania
- Howe Township, Grant County, North Dakota, in Grant County, North Dakota
