= Julie Howe =

American screenwriter

- Occupations: Screenwriter, producer, children's book author
- Writing career
- Language: English
- Genres: Children's fiction, screenwriting
- Website: juleshowe.com

Julie "Jules" Howe is a California screenwriter, producer and children's book author. Her first children's book and Hoffer Award winner, Catty Wompus: A Tale of Friendship, is about a lonely girl who learns the true value of friends. It's based on a childhood experience of the author. The sequel, Catty Wompus and The New Kid, takes the lessons learned, one step further. In 2015, Catty and her pals were brought to life in a musical television pilot called The Adventures of Catty Wompus that she hopes will become a series.

In addition to the Catty Wompus books, Howe is a screenwriter whose screenplay, Jasper Milliken, won the Austin Film Festival comedy award in 2010. Since then, her screenplays have placed in top-ranking film festivals and screenplay competitions such as BlueCat, Nicholl Fellowship, PAGE International Screenwriting Awards and Fresh Voices. She recently had the honor of being included in the Austin Film Festival's Inaugural Screenwriters to Watch article in MovieMaker magazine, 19 July 2016.

Howe holds a Feature Film Writing Certificate from UCLA Extension as well as the Academy of Film Writing. She's a founding board member of the Cinematic Arts and Technology Foundation of Cal State Monterey Bay whose goal is to empower at-risk youth through year-round community programs that investigate, educate and celebrate the cinematic arts.

== Children's books ==
- Catty Wompus: A Tale of Friendship (2010)
- Catty Wompus and The New Kid (2015)

== Television ==
- The Adventures of Catty Wompus (2015)

== Recognition ==
Howe's feature script, Jasper Milliken, won the Austin Film Festival Screenwriting competition, comedy category, in 2010 and her script Dead Sexy was an AFF semi-finalist the following year. Howe's screenplay Epiphany finished third in the BlueCat Screenwriting Lab Awards in 2008 and was a PAGE Awards Semi-finalist in 2014. The Richmond Film Festival 2015 Official Screenplay Selections for a short screenplay was Howe's A Stroke of Genius. Her feature script Down on the Farm won the Fresh Voices 2014/2015 Screenplay Competition, family film category, and was a 2015 PAGE Awards semi-finalist.
