= Rex Howe =

English Anglican priest (1929–2024)

Rex Alan Howe (March 1929 – 11 August 2024) was an English Anglican priest.

== Biography ==
Rex Alan Howe was born in March 1929, and after national service with the Army Catering Corps studied at Christ's College, Cambridge. He then attended the College of the Resurrection Mirfield and was ordained in 1956. After curacies in Barnsley and Helmsley he held incumbencies in Middlesbrough, Redcar and Kirkleatham. He was Rural Dean of Guisborough from 1967 to 1973. In 1973 he became Dean of Hong Kong; and its Archdeacon in 1975. Later he was Rector of Grantham, and a Canon Prebendary of Lincoln Cathedral before his final post as Vicar of Canford Cliffs and Sandbanks. He retired in 1994.

He died in 2024, aged 95.
