= Justice Howe =

Justice Howe may refer to:

- John H. Howe (judge) (1801–1873), chief justice of the Wyoming Territorial Supreme Court
- Richard C. Howe (born 1924), associate justice and chief justice of the Utah Supreme Court
- Timothy O. Howe (1816–1883), associate justice of the Wisconsin Supreme Court
- William Wirt Howe (1833–1909), associate justice of the Louisiana Supreme Court

== See also ==
- Judge Howe (disambiguation)
