= Howe High School =

Howe High School may refer to:

- Howe High School (Howe, Oklahoma)
- Howe High School (Texas), Howe, Texas
- Thomas Carr Howe Middle School, Indianapolis, Indiana, formerly Thomas Carr Howe High School
