= Thomas Howes =

Thomas Howes may refer to:

- Thomas George Bond Howes (1853–1905), English malacologist
- Thomas Howes (hostage) (born 1953), American Northrop Grumman employee; former hostage of Revolutionary Armed Forces of Colombia (FARC)
- Thomas Howes (actor) (born 1986), English actor and musician
- Thomas Howes (cleric) (1728-1814), English scholar and minister

== See also ==
- Tommy Howe (1892–1957), English footballer
- Thomas Howe (disambiguation)
