= Richard How =

- Born: Richard Alfred How; December 1944 Armidale, New South Wales

Rugby union career
- Position: wing
International career
Years	Team	Apps	(Points)
1967	Wallabies	1	(0)

Richard Alfred How (born December 1944) was a rugby union player who represented Australia.

How, a wing, was born in Armidale, New South Wales and claimed 1 international rugby cap for Australia.
