= James Lewis Howe =

American chemist (1859–1955)

- Born: 4 August 1859; Newburyport, Massachusetts, United States
- Died: 20 December 1955 (aged 96)
- Education: Amherst College (BA), University of Göttingen (PhD)
- Occupation: chemist
- Known for: studied platinum group of metals
- Notable work: multi-part bibliography of the metals of the platinum group
- Spouse: Henrietta Leavenworth Marvine (m. 1883)
- Children: 2 daughters, 1 son
- Parents: Francis Augustine Howe (father); Mary Frances née Lewis (mother)

James Lewis Howe (4 August 1859 – 20 December 1955) was an American chemist who specialized in the platinum group of metals. He published a very influential multi-part bibliography of the metals of the platinum group from 1897 right until his death.

== Biography ==
Howe was born in Newburyport, Massachusetts to Mary Frances née Lewis and physician Francis Augustine Howe. He went to study medicine but moved to chemistry, graduating BA from Amherst College in 1880 after which he went to the University of Göttingen researching aromatic compounds under Hans Hübner and Friedrich Wöhler to receive a doctorate in 1882. He returned to the US and became an instructor at the Brooks Military Academy in Cleveland, Ohio (until 1883) followed by Central College, Richmond, Kentucky, and then to the Washington and Lee University as a professor in 1894. He retired in 1938 but was recalled during World War II to teach chemistry and German. His experimental work was chiefly on platinum and ruthenium compounds.

Howe married Henrietta Leavenworth Marvine in 1883 and they had two daughters and a namesake son who also became a chemist.
