= W. B. W. Howe Jr. =

William Bell White Howe, Jr. (2 November 1851 – 11 February 1912), commonly known by W. B. W. Howe Jr., was an architect in Charleston, South Carolina. He was chief engineer for branches of the Charleston & Savannah Railway and the Savannah, Florida and Western Railway. A residence and a residential complex he designed in Charleston are listed on the National Register of Historic Places (NRHP). He was also involved in the design of the Jacksonville Terminal Complex (Union Station).

He was the son of the Episcopal bishop William B. W. Howe.

He co-patented an automatic air brake design in 1885.

The home he built for himself was in Flat Rock, Henderson County, North Carolina, and is now part of the Flat Rock Historic District. He lived in Flat Rock when he expressed interest in work on Jacksonville, Florida's Union Station.

== Works ==
- Charles Drayton House (1886) NRHP listed
- Poppenheim Hardware Store (1891)
- William Enston Home, a complex of teo-story brick cottages at 900 King Street, NRHP listed
- Union Station (1919), Beaux-arts, Kenneth M. Murchison and W.B.W. Howe NRHP listed as Jacksonville Terminal Complex, 1000 W. Bay St. Jacksonville, FL
- St. Philips, local superintending architect
- St. Jude's Church, Walterboro, consecrated by his father
- Sagilla River railroad bridge
- St. Michael's Episcopal Church restoration, one of the architects
