= William B. W. Howe =

American bishop

The Right Reverend William Bell White Howe D.D. S.T.D.
- Bishop of South Carolina
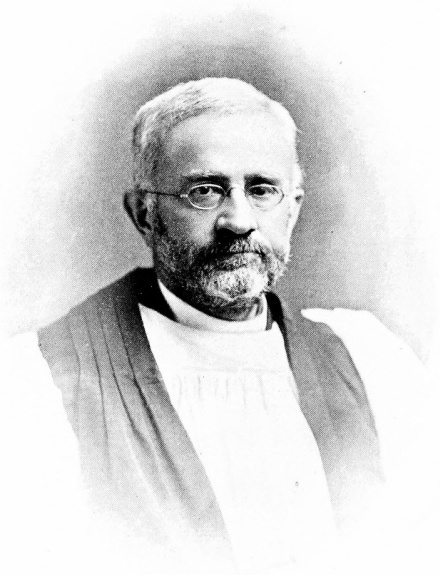
- Church: Episcopal Church
- Diocese: South Carolina
- Elected: May 14, 1871
- In office: 1871–1894
- Predecessor: Thomas F. Davis
- Successor: Ellison Capers
- Previous post: Assistant Bishop of South Carolina (1871)

Orders
- Ordination: June 4, 1849 by Christopher Edwards Gadsden
- Consecration: October 8, 1871 by Benjamin B. Smith

Personal details
- Born: March 21, 1823 Claremont, New Hampshire, United States
- Died: November 25, 1894 (aged 71) Charleston, South Carolina, United States
- Buried: St. Philip's Episcopal Church (Charleston, South Carolina)
- Denomination: Anglican
- Spouse: Catherine Gadsden Edwards (m. 1850)
- Children: 5, including William Jr.

William Bell White Howe (March 31, 1823 – November 25, 1894) was the sixth Bishop of South Carolina in the Episcopal Church.

== Early life and education ==
Howe was born on March 31, 1823, in Claremont, New Hampshire, the son of the Reverend James Blake Howe and Mary White. He studied at the University of Vermont and graduated with a Bachelor of Arts in 1844. He was awarded a Doctor of Divinity from Sewanee: The University of the South in 1871 and a Doctor of Sacred Theology from Columbia College in 1872.

== Ordained ministry ==
Howe was ordained deacon on April 9, 1847, and priest on June 4, 1849, by the Bishop of South Carolina Christopher Edwards Gadsden in Charleston, South Carolina, on both occasions. He served as rector of St John's Church in Berkley, South Carolina from 1848 till 1860. He married Catherine Gadsden Edwards on December 12, 1850. He then served as rector of St Philip's Church in Charleston, South Carolina between 1863 and 1871.

== Bishop ==
On May 14, 1871, Howe was elected Coadjutor Bishop of South Carolina on October 8, 1871, in St Paul's Church, Baltimore by Presiding Bishop Benjamin B. Smith. He succeeded as diocesan bishop upon the death of Bishop Davis on December 2, 1871. He died in office in Charleston on November 25, 1894.

== Family ==
Architect W. B. W. Howe, Jr. was his son.

== See also ==
- List of Succession of Bishops for the Episcopal Church, USA
