= How, Cumbria =

Hamlet in Cumbria, England

Coordinates: 54.899°N 2.772°W

How
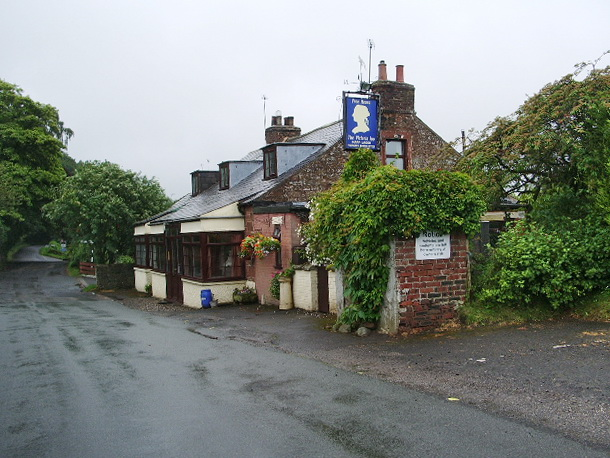
- The Victoria Inn public house, How

- Location in the former Carlisle district, Cumbria Location within Cumbria
- OS grid reference: NY504563
- Civil parish: Hayton
- Unitary authority: Cumberland
- Ceremonial county: Cumbria
- Region: North West
- Country: England
- Sovereign state: United Kingdom
- Post town: BRAMPTON
- Postcode district: CA8
- Dialling code: 01228
- Police: Cumbria
- Fire: Cumbria
- Ambulance: North West
- UK Parliament: Carlisle

How is a hamlet in the English county of Cumbria.

How is located eight miles due east of the city of Carlisle, to the south of Hayton. There are many hotels in Cumbria with How in the name. The name How is derived from the Old Norse word haugr meaning hill or mound.
