= Jeremy Howe (English footballer) =

English footballer

Personal information
- Full name: Jeremy Raymond Howe
- Date of birth: 5 September 1973 (age 53)
- Place of birth: Dewsbury, England
- Position: Midfielder

Senior career*
Years	Team	Apps	(Gls)
1991–1992	Bradford City	3	(0)
- * Club domestic league appearances and goals

Jeremy Raymond Howe (born 5 September 1973) is an English former professional footballer who played as a midfielder.

== Career ==
Born in Dewsbury, Howe played for Bradford City, making three appearances in the Football League.
