= Anthony Howe (historian) =

English historian

- Born: Anthony C. Howe
- Education: Cheltenham Grammar School; Wadham College, Oxford; Nuffield College, Oxford
- Occupation: Historian
- Employer: University of East Anglia

Anthony C. Howe is an English historian and Professor of Modern History at the University of East Anglia, a post he has held since 2003. He has previously taught at the Department of International History at the London School of Economics and Modern History at Oriel College, Oxford.

Howe was educated at Cheltenham Grammar School, Wadham College, Oxford and was a postgraduate student at Nuffield College, Oxford.

He is the editor of The Cobden Project, a four-volume set of annotated letters of the nineteenth-century British politician Richard Cobden, published by Oxford University Press.

== Works ==
- The Cotton Masters, 1830–1860 (Oxford, 1984).
- "Towards the 'hungry forties': free trade in Britain, c. 1880–1906", in Eugenio Biagini (ed.), Citizenship and Community. Liberals, Radicals and Collective Identities in the British Isles. 1865–1931 (Cambridge, 1996), pp. 193–218.
- Free Trade and Liberal England, 1846–1946 (Oxford, 1997).
- "Re-Forging Britons: Richard Cobden and France", in S. Aprile & F. Bensimon (eds), La France et L'Angleterre an XIXe siècle (Paris, 2006), pp. 89–104
- "Two Faces of British Power: Cobden versus Palmerston", in David Brown and Miles Taylor (eds), Palmerston Studies II (Southampton, 2007), pp. 168–92
- "Free Trade and Global Order", in Duncan Bell (ed.), Victorian Visions of Global Order (Cambridge, 2007), pp. 26–46.
- The Letters of Richard Cobden: Volume I: 1815–1847 (Oxford, 2007).
- The Letters of Richard Cobden: Volume II: 1848–1853 (Oxford, 2010).
- The Letters of Richard Cobden: Volume III: 1854–1859 (Oxford, 2012).
- The Letters of Richard Cobden: Volume IV: 1860–1865 (Oxford, 2015).
- "British Liberalism and the Legacy of Saint-Simon: The Case of Richard Cobden", History of Economic Ideas (forthcoming).
