= Curzon (surname) =

Curzon is a surname, and may refer to:

- Alfred Curzon, 4th Baron Scarsdale (1831–1916), British clergyman
- Aria Curzon (born 1987), American actress
- Assheton Curzon, 1st Viscount Curzon (1730–1820), British politician
- Charles Curzon (1878–1954), English Anglican bishop
- Christopher Curzon (born 1958), English cricketer
- Clifford Curzon (1907–1982), English classical pianist
- Daniel Curzon (born 1938), American writer
- Danielle Curzon (born 1983), British bodyguard and mixed martial arts referee
- Edward Curzon, 6th Earl Howe (1908–1984), British Royal Navy officer
- Elizabeth Curzon, Countess Howe (born 1955), British peeress, educator and philanthropist
- Ephraim Curzon (1883—1966), English soldier and rugby union and rugby league footballer
- Flora Curzon, Lady Howe (1870–1925), American heiress and singer
- Francis Curzon (died 1592), English politician
- Francis Curzon, 5th Earl Howe (1884–1964), British naval officer, politician, and racing driver and promoter
- Francis Curzon, 3rd Viscount Scarsdale (1924–2000), British peer
- Frank Curzon (1868–1927), English actor and theatre manager
- Frederic Curzon (1899–1973), English composer, conductor and musician
- Frederick Curzon, 7th Earl Howe (born 1951), British peer
- George Curzon (actor) (1898–1976), English Royal Navy commander and actor
- George Curzon, 1st Marquess Curzon of Kedleston (1859–1925), British politician and Viceroy of India
- Lady Georgiana Curzon (1910–1976), English socialite
- Grace Curzon, Marchioness Curzon of Kedleston (1885–1958), United States-born British marchioness
- Henry Curzon (1765–1846), Royal Navy officer
- Irene Curzon, 2nd Baroness Ravensdale (1896–1966), British socialite and philanthropist
- Jill Curzon (1938–2026), English actress
- John Curzon (cricketer) (born 1954), English cricketer
- Sir John Curzon, 1st Baronet (1598–1686), English politician
- Sir John Curzon, 3rd Baronet (1674–1727), English politician
- Kathleen Curzon-Herrick (1893–1965), British novelist
- Lady Mary-Gaye Curzon (born 1947), British model and socialite
- Mary Curzon, Baroness Curzon of Kedleston (1870–1906), British peeress of American background
- Mary Curzon, Lady Howe (1887–1962), English noblewoman
- Montagu Curzon (1846–1907), British soldier and politician
- Sir Nathaniel Curzon, 4th Baronet (1676–1758), English politician
- Nathaniel Curzon, 1st Baron Scarsdale (1726–1804), English politician and peer
- Nathaniel Curzon, 2nd Baron Scarsdale (1752–1837), English politician and peer
- Rachel Curzon (born 1978), English poet
- Richard Curzon, 4th Earl Howe (1861–1929), British courtier and politician
- Richard Curzon, 2nd Viscount Scarsdale (1898–1977), English peer and landowner
- Robert Curzon (MP, died 1550) (c.1491–1550), English Member of Parliament
- Robert Curzon (MP, born 1774) (1774–1863), English Member of Parliament
- Robert Curzon, 14th Baron Zouche (1810–1873), English traveller, diplomat and author
- Sarah Anne Curzon (1833–1898), Canadian poet and writer
- Victoria Curzon-Price (born 1942), Swiss economist
- William Curzon (c.1681–1749), British lawyer and politician

== See also ==
- Curzon-Howe
- Roper-Curzon
