= Kidston (surname) =

Kidston is a surname. Notable people with the surname include:

- Annabel Kidston (1896–1981), Scottish artist
- Cath Kidston (born 1958), English fashion designer, businesswoman and writer
- David Kidston (1859–1909), Scottish rugby union player
- Glen Kidston (1899–1931), English aviator and racing driver
- Home Kidston (1910–1996), Royal Navy officer, farmer and racing driver
- Robert Kidston (1852–1924), Scottish palaeobiologist
- Simon Kidston (born 1967), British classic car dealer
- William Kidston (1849–1919), Australian politician
  - Kidstonites, political party
  - First Kidston ministry
  - Second Kidston ministry
- William Kidston (Canadian politician) (1816–1882), Canadian politician
- William Hamilton Kidston (1852–1929), Scottish rugby union player
