= John Curzon =

John Curzon may refer to:

- Sir John Curzon, 1st Baronet (1598–1686), MP for Derbyshire
- Sir John Curzon, 3rd Baronet (1674–1727), MP for Derbyshire
- John Curzon (cricketer) (born 1954), English former first-class cricketer

== See also ==
- Curzon (disambiguation)
