= Curson =

Curson may refer to:

- Curson (demon) (also Purson), a demon in the Ars Goetia
- Robert of Courçon (c. 1160–1219), English Cardinal
- Robert Curson (c. 1460–1535), English Soldier, Courtier and spy
- Curson baronets, of Water Perry, Oxford England
- David Curson (1948–2024), American politician
- Ted Curson (1935–2012), American jazz musician

== See also ==
- Curzon (disambiguation)
- Kurson, a surname
- Chanos-Curson, a French commune
