= Vera Konstantinovna of Russia =

Vera Konstantinovna of Russia may refer to:

- Grand Duchess Vera Konstantinovna of Russia (1854–1912), granddaughter of Nicholas I of Russia & adopted daughter of Charles I of Württemberg
- Princess Vera Konstantinovna of Russia (1906–2001), niece of the above & daughter of Grand Duke Konstantin Konstantinovich of Russia
