= Curzan =

Curzan is a surname. Notable people with the surname include:

- Anne Curzan, American linguist
- Claire Curzan (born 2004), American swimmer

== See also ==
- Curzon (disambiguation)
