= Kurson =

Kurson is a surname, likely a variant of the surname Curzon. Notable people with the surname include:

- Jane Kurson, American film editor
- Ken Kurson (born 1968), American political consultant, writer, journalist, and former musician
- Robert Kurson (born 1963), American author

== See also ==
- Curson (disambiguation)
- Curzon (disambiguation)
