= 1929 Luft Hansa Junkers G 24 crash =

1929 plane crash near Godstone, Surrey, England

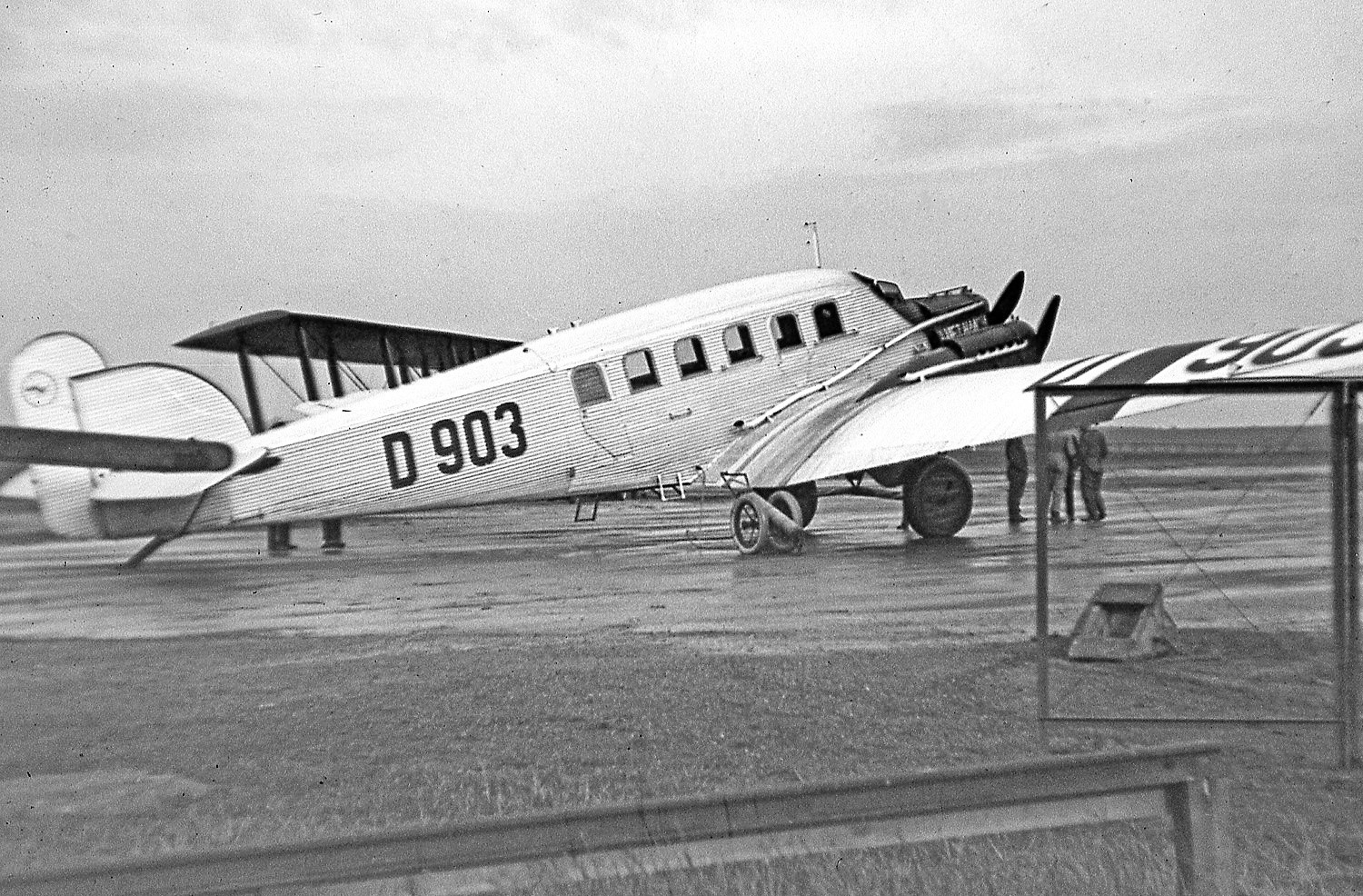
- D-903, the Junkers G 24 involved in the accident.

Accident
- Date: 6 November 1929
- Summary: CFIT
- Site: Godstone, Surrey, United Kingdom; 51°14′54″N 0°04′07″W

Aircraft
- Aircraft type: Junkers G 24bi
- Aircraft name: Oberschlesien
- Operator: Luft Hansa
- Registration: D-903
- Flight origin: Croydon Airport, Surrey, United Kingdom
- Destination: Amsterdam-Schiphol Municipal Airport Netherlands
- Passengers: 4
- Crew: 4
- Fatalities: 7
- Injuries: 1
- Survivors: 1

The 1929 Luft Hansa Junkers G.24 crash occurred on 6 November 1929 when a Junkers G 24 of Luft Hansa crashed at Godstone, Surrey, United Kingdom while on an international scheduled flight from Croydon, Surrey, United Kingdom to Amsterdam-Schiphol Municipal Airport, Amsterdam, Netherlands. Of the eight people on board, Glen Kidston was the only survivor.

== Aircraft ==
The accident aircraft was Junkers G 24 D-903 Oberschlesien, c/n 911.

== Accident ==
On 6 November 1929, the aircraft was operating a scheduled international passenger flight from Croydon to Amsterdam. The aircraft departed at 09:54. The weather at the time was poor. It was reported that the pilot may have been attempting to return to Croydon when the aircraft crashed into some trees at Marden Park, Godstone in thick fog. The aircraft burst into flames; three of the crew and three of the four passengers were killed in the crash. Passenger Glen Kidston escaped from the wreckage with his clothing on fire and extinguished the flames by rolling in the grass, sustaining minor injuries. Second pilot Prince Eugen of Schaumburg-Lippe also escaped from the wreckage, but he was seriously injured. Kidston raised the alarm and reported the accident to Croydon Airport. He was treated at Caterham Cottage Hospital. The fire was eventually extinguished by firemen from Caterham. Personnel from RAF Kenley assisted the local police in collecting the remains of the deceased and transporting them to a mortuary in Caterham. Von Schaumburg-Lippe died the day after the accident from injuries sustained in the crash.

After being treated for his injuries, Kidston returned to Croydon where he made a short flight, before returning home to Grosvenor Square, Mayfair, London. An inquest was opened at Caterham on 8 November. After hearing identification evidence, it was adjourned until 22 November, when it was hoped that Kidston would be fit enough to give evidence. The inquest resumed as scheduled. Evidence was given that the aircraft was flying at an altitude of 300 metres (1,000 ft) before descending to an altitude of 30 metres (100 ft) above ground level. At the time of the crash, the aircraft was flying in a northerly direction. Von Schaumburg-Lippe had been thrown clear of the aircraft in the crash. A verdict of "accidental death" was returned in all cases.

== Casualties ==
The nationalities of the victims were-

Nationality	Crew	Passengers	Killed	Injured
German	4	–	4	–
English	–	3	2	1
Indian	–	1	1	–
Total	4	4	7	1
