= Duchess Olga of Württemberg =

Olga of Württemberg
- Princess Maximilian of Schaumburg-Lippe
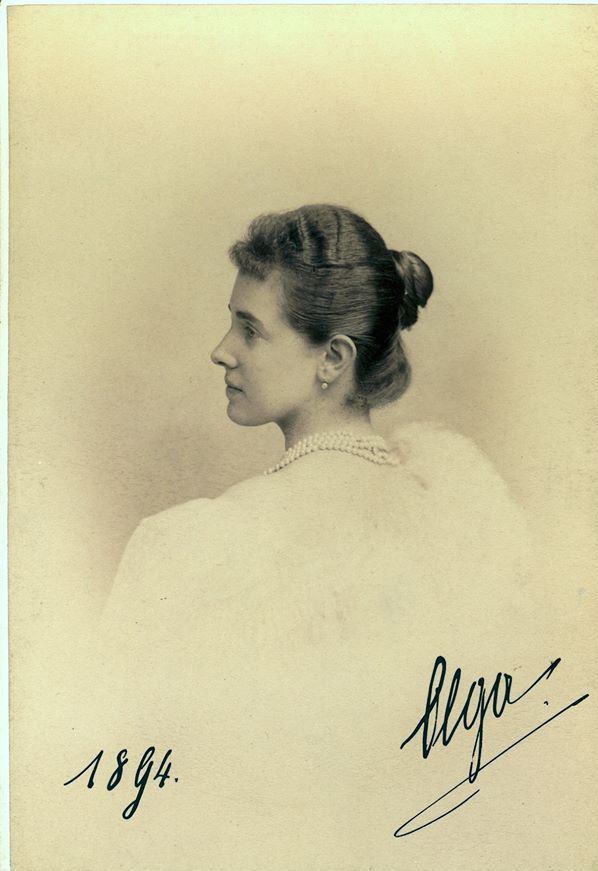
- Photograph, 1896
- Born: 1 March 1876; Stuttgart, Kingdom of Württemberg
- Died: 21 October 1932 (aged 56); Ludwigsburg, Weimar Republic
- Spouse: Prince Maximilian of Schaumburg-Lippe (m. 1898; died 1904)
- Issue: Prince Eugen; Prince Albrecht; Prince Bernhard
Names
- German: Herzogin Olga Alexandrine Marie von Württemberg
- House: Württemberg
- Father: Duke Eugen of Württemberg
- Mother: Grand Duchess Vera Konstantinovna of Russia

Duchess Olga of Württemberg (German: Herzogin Olga Alexandrine Marie von Württemberg; 1 March 1876 – 21 October 1932) was a daughter of Duke Eugen of Württemberg and Grand Duchess Vera Constantinovna of Russia. She married Prince Maximilian of Schaumburg-Lippe.

== Early life and family ==
Princess Olga was born at Stuttgart, Württemberg on 1 March 1876. She was the younger twin daughter of Duke Eugen of Württemberg (1846–1877), and Grand Duchess Vera Constantinovna of Russia (1854–1912). Her father was chosen by Charles I of Württemberg (a distant relative) as a husband for her mother, who was Charles' and Queen Olga's niece and adopted daughter.

Her elder brother, Duke Charles-Eugen of Württemberg, died young in 1875. Her older twin was Duchess Elsa of Württemberg (1876–1936), who married her husband's brother, Prince Albert of Schaumburg-Lippe. The twin sisters did not look alike and Olga, who was much taller than her sister, seemed to be the elder of the two.

Her paternal grandparents were Duke Eugen of Württemberg, and Princess Mathilde of Schaumburg-Lippe. Her maternal grandparents were Grand Duke Konstantin Nikolayevich of Russia and Princess Alexandra of Saxe-Altenburg.

== Marriage and issue ==
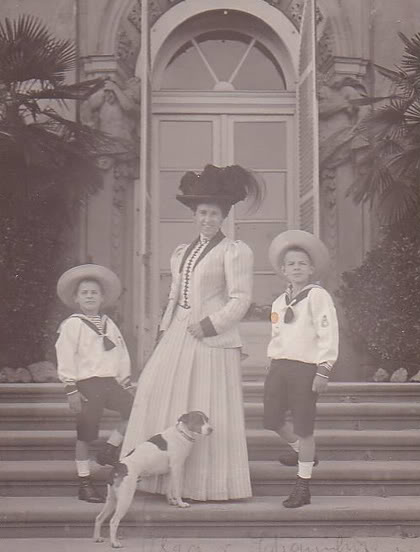
Olga of Württemberg with her sons: Prince Albrecht of Schaumburg-Lippe (right) and Prince Eugen of Schaumburg-Lippe (left).

There were plans to marry Duchess Olga to Prince Maximilian of Baden, but he ultimately married Princess Marie Louise of Hanover. In March 1898, there were reports of her engagement to Prince Eugen of Sweden, the youngest son of King Oscar II of Sweden. The marriage never occurred; Prince Eugen, a notable artist, remained a bachelor.

On 3 November 1898, Olga was married to Prince Maximilian of Schaumburg-Lippe (1871–1904) at Stuttgart, Baden-Württemberg. He was the son of Wilhelm, Prince of Schaumburg-Lippe, and Bathildis, Princess of Anhalt-Dessau. Their marriage lasted less than six years before her husband died young. Together, they had three sons:

- Prince Eugen of Schaumburg-Lippe (8 August 1899 – 6 November 1929), who died unmarried at age 30 at Caterham, Surrey, England, in a plane crash.
- Prince Albrecht of Schaumburg-Lippe (17 October 1900 – 20 May 1984), who married Baroness Walburga von Hirschberg (1906–1986) in 1930. They had no children, however; he had a daughter with Baroness Marie-Gabriele von Pfetten-Arnbach (1927–2015).
- Prince Bernhard of Schaumburg-Lippe (8 December 1902 – 24 June 1903), who died in infancy.

Prince Maximilian died on 1 April 1904. Olga died on 21 October 1932.

=== Descendants ===
Through her second son Albrecht, she was posthumously the grandmother of Andrea of Schaumburg-Lippe (b. 1960), who married Count Franz von Degenfeld-Schonburg on 4 September 1993. They had three children.

== Ancestry ==
Ancestors of Duchess Olga of Württemberg

8. Duke Eugen of Württemberg
4. Duke Eugen of Württemberg
9. Princess Mathilde of Waldeck and Pyrmont
2. Duke Eugen of Württemberg
10. George William, Prince of Schaumburg-Lippe
5. Princess Mathilde of Schaumburg-Lippe
11. Princess Ida of Waldeck and Pyrmont
1. Duchess Olga of Württemberg
12. Nicholas I of Russia
6. Grand Duke Konstantin Nikolayevich of Russia
13. Princess Charlotte of Prussia
3. Grand Duchess Vera Constantinovna of Russia
14. Joseph, Duke of Saxe-Altenburg
7. Princess Alexandra of Saxe-Altenburg
15. Duchess Amelia of Württemberg
