= Christopher Curzon =

English cricketer

Personal information
- Full name: Christopher Colin Curzon
- Born: 22 December 1958 (age 67); Lenton, Nottinghamshire, England
- Batting: Right-handed
- Role: Wicket-keeper
- Relatives: John Curzon (brother)

Domestic team information
- Years: Team
- 1978–1980: Nottinghamshire
- 1981: Hampshire

Career statistics
Competition	First-class	List A
Matches	18	11
Runs scored	307	82
Batting average	17.05	20.50
100s/50s	–/–	–/–
Top score	45	28*
Catches/stumpings	32/3	9/1
- Source: Cricinfo, 23 December 2009

Christopher Colin Curzon (born 22 December 1958) is an English former first-class cricketer.

== Life and cricket career ==
Curzon was born in the Nottingham suburb of Lenton. He was educated at the Peveril Secondary School in Aspley, Nottingham. He began playing as a wicket-keeper for the Nottinghamshire Second XI in 1976, with his debut in first-class cricket later coming for Nottinghamshire against Northamptonshire at Northampton in the 1978 County Championship, but did not keep wicket. With Nottinghamshire's regular wicket-keeper Bruce French playing for England Young Cricketers in July 1978, this afforded Curzon three further appearances in the County Championship. During the 1978 season, he also made his debut in List A one-day cricket against Yorkshire at Scarborough in the John Player League.

In 1979, he made three appearances in the County Championship, with a further one-day appearance against Yorkshire. French missed the first two months of the 1980 season recuperating from a wrist operation, with Curzon deputising for him by making eight appearances in the County Championship, and nine one-day appearances spread across the Benson & Hedges Cup and the John Player League. Once French had recovered he returned the side, with Curzon never featuring for Nottinghamshire again. In seventeen first-class appearances for Nottinghamshire, he scored 254 runs at an average of 14.94, with a highest score of 45. In eleven one-day matches, he scored 82 runs at an average of 20.50, with a highest score of 28 not out.

Curzon played for Hampshire in 1981, making one first-class appearance against the touring Sri Lankans at Bournemouth; however, he was unable to dislodge Hampshire's regular wicket-keeper Bobby Parks. He played club cricket for both Wollaton and Caythorpe Cricket Club's. Besides cricket, Curzon played football as a defender for Ilkeston Town in the Midland Football League. He was also a keen golfer. In later life, Curzon was the director of a commercial trailer manufacturing company. His brother, John, was also a first-class cricketer.
