= Duke Eugen of Württemberg (1846–1877) =

German prince and staff officer

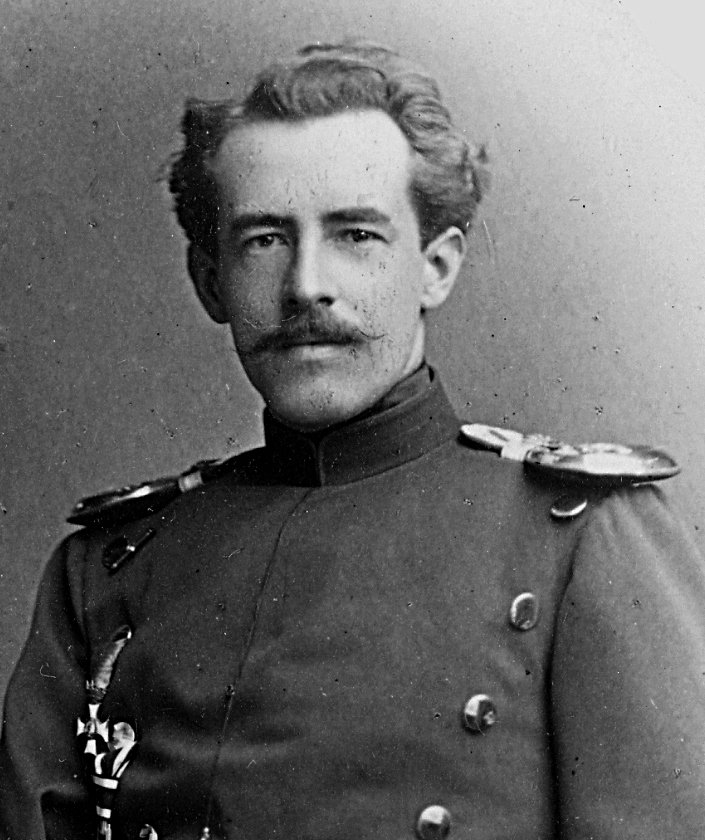
- Born: 20 August 1846; Bückeburg, Schaumburg-Lippe
- Died: 27 January 1877 (aged 30); Düsseldorf, Kingdom of Prussia
- Spouse: Grand Duchess Vera Konstantinovna of Russia (m. 1874)
- Issue: Duke Charles Eugen; Duchess Elsa; Duchess Olga
Names
- German: Wilhelm Eugen August Georg
- House: Württemberg
- Father: Duke Eugen of Württemberg
- Mother: Princess Mathilde of Schaumburg-Lippe

Duke Eugen of Württemberg (German: Herzog Wilhelm Eugen August Georg von Württemberg; 20 August 1846 – 27 January 1877) was a German prince and a staff officer of Württemberg.

== Early life and family ==
Duke Eugen was born at Bückeburg, Schaumburg-Lippe, second child and first son of Duke Eugen of Württemberg (1820–1875) and Princess Mathilde of Waldeck and Pyrmont) and his wife, Princess Mathilde of Schaumburg-Lippe. Eugen grew up in Carlsruhe in Silesia. He studied at the University of Tübingen.

== Military career ==
In 1866 he joined as a lieutenant in the Army of Württemberg. With the 3rd Cavalry Regiment, he took part in the Austro-Prussian War.

Back in September 1866 after the war, until 1870 he leave the military service to continue his studies, he lived for one period in Paris. Together with his uncle, Duke William of Württemberg, he undertook from July 1868 to January 1869 a trip to the United States.

During the Franco-Prussian War of 1870-71, he fought as a lieutenant in the Battles of Mezieres, Chevilly, Mont Mesly and Villiers. In 1871 he became captain, in 1872 he was the 19th (1st Württemberg) Uhlans "King William I". In 1874 he was Major and 1876 staff officer. In December 1876 as a squadron leader Eugene was reassigned for the 2 Westphalian Hussar Regiment No. 11 in Düsseldorf.

== Marriage and issue ==
Duke Eugen was chosen by Charles I of Württemberg (a distant relative) as a husband for Grand Duchess Vera Konstantinovna of Russia, who was Charles' and Queen Olga's niece and adopted daughter. On 8 May 1874, in Stuttgart, he married Vera (1854–1912), daughter of Grand Duke Konstantin Nikolayevich of Russia and Princess Alexandra of Saxe-Altenburg.

They had three children:

- Duke Charles-Eugen of Württemberg (8 April 1875 – 11 November 1875); died young.
- Duchess Elsa of Württemberg (1 March 1876 – 27 May 1936); married Prince Albrecht of Schaumburg-Lippe (24 October 1869 – 25 December 1942) in 1897.
- Duchess Olga of Württemberg (1 March 1876 – 21 October 1932); married Prince Maximilian of Schaumburg-Lippe (13 March 1871 – 1 April 1904) in 1898.

== Death ==
Eugen died of a sudden illness aged 30. He was buried in the Castle Church in Stuttgart. At the time of his death he was next in the line to the throne of Württemberg after Prince William (later King William II).

== Honours ==
- Württemberg:
  - Grand Cross of the Württemberg Crown, 1860
  - Grand Cross of the Friedrich Order
  - Knight of the Military Merit Order, 2 January 1871
- Baden: Knight of the House Order of Fidelity
- Kingdom of Bavaria: Knight of St. Hubert, 1874
- (Saxe-Coburg and Gotha) (Duchy of Saxe-Altenburg) (Saxe-Meiningen) Ernestine duchies: Grand Cross of the Saxe-Ernestine House Order
- Kingdom of Greece: Grand Cross of the Redeemer
- Grand Duchy of Hesse: Grand Cross of the Ludwig Order
- (Principality of Schaumburg-Lippe) Lippe:
  - Cross of Honour of the House Order of Lippe, 1st Class with Swords
  - Military Merit Medal
- Oldenburg: Grand Cross of the Order of Duke Peter Friedrich Ludwig, with Golden Crown, 1 May 1874
- Kingdom of Prussia:
  - Iron Cross, 2nd Class
  - Grand Cross of the Red Eagle
- Russian Empire: Knight of St. Andrew

== Ancestry ==
Ancestors of Duke Eugen of Württemberg (1846–1877)

8. Duke Eugen of Württemberg
4. Duke Eugen of Württemberg
9. Princess Louise of Stolberg-Gedern
2. Duke Eugen of Württemberg
10. George I, Prince of Waldeck and Pyrmont
5. Princess Mathilde of Waldeck and Pyrmont
11. Princess Augusta of Schwarzburg-Sondershausen
1. Duke Eugen of Württemberg
12. Philip II, Count of Schaumburg-Lippe
6. George William, Prince of Schaumburg-Lippe
13. Landgravine Juliana of Hesse-Philippsthal
3. Princess Mathilde of Schaumburg-Lippe
14. George I, Prince of Waldeck and Pyrmont (= 10)
7. Princess Ida of Waldeck and Pyrmont
15. Princess Augusta of Schwarzburg-Sondershausen (= 11)

== Notes and sources ==
- The Royal House of Stuart, London, 1969, 1971, 1976, Addington, A. C., Reference: page 223
- L'Allemagne dynastique, Huberty, Giraud, Magdelaine, Reference: vol II page 540.
- Martin, Frederick (1879). The statesman's year-book. London: Macmillan and Co.
