= Grand Duchess Vera Konstantinovna of Russia =

Russian noblewoman (1854–1912)

Grand Duchess Vera Konstantinovna
- Duchess Eugen of Württemberg
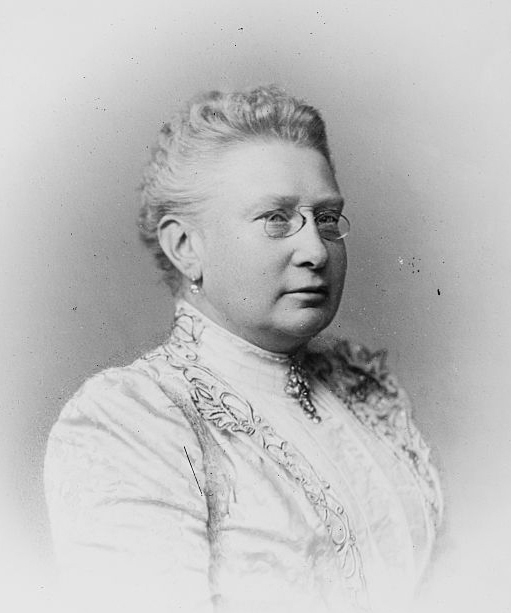
- Photograph, 1909
- Born: 16 February 1854; Saint Petersburg, Russia
- Died: 11 April 1912 (aged 58); Stuttgart, Kingdom of Württemberg, Germany
- Spouse: Duke Eugen of Württemberg (m. 1874; died 1877)
- Issue: Duke Charles Eugen: Elsa, Princess Albert of Schaumburg-Lippe; Olga, Princess Maximilian of Schaumburg-Lippe
- House: Holstein-Gottorp-Romanov
- Father: Grand Duke Konstantin Nikolayevich of Russia
- Mother: Princess Alexandra of Saxe-Altenburg

Grand Duchess Vera Konstantinovna of Russia (Russian: Вера Константиновна; 16 February 1854 – 11 April 1912) was the daughter of Grand Duke Konstantin Nikolayevich of Russia. She was a granddaughter of Tsar Nicholas I and first cousin of Tsar Alexander III of Russia.

She had a difficult childhood marked by illness and tantrums. In 1863, while her father was Viceroy of Poland, she was given away to be raised by her childless uncle and aunt, King Karl and Queen Olga of Württemberg. Vera's condition improved in their home and she outgrew her disruptive behavior. In 1871, she was legally adopted by Karl and Olga, who arranged her marriage in 1874 to Duke Eugen of Württemberg (1846–1877), a member of the Silesian ducal branch of the family. Her husband died suddenly three years later. Vera, only 23 years old, did not remarry, dedicating herself to her twin daughters. At the death of King Karl in 1891, Vera inherited a considerable fortune and she turned her home into a cultural gathering place. She was a popular figure in Württemberg, notable for her charitable work.

Grand Duchess Vera was known in royal circles as an eccentric both in appearance and behavior. Although she kept in touch with her Romanov relatives, visiting Russia many times, she identified more closely with her adopted country. In 1909, she abandoned Orthodox Christianity and converted to Lutheranism. She died two years later after a stroke.

== Early life ==
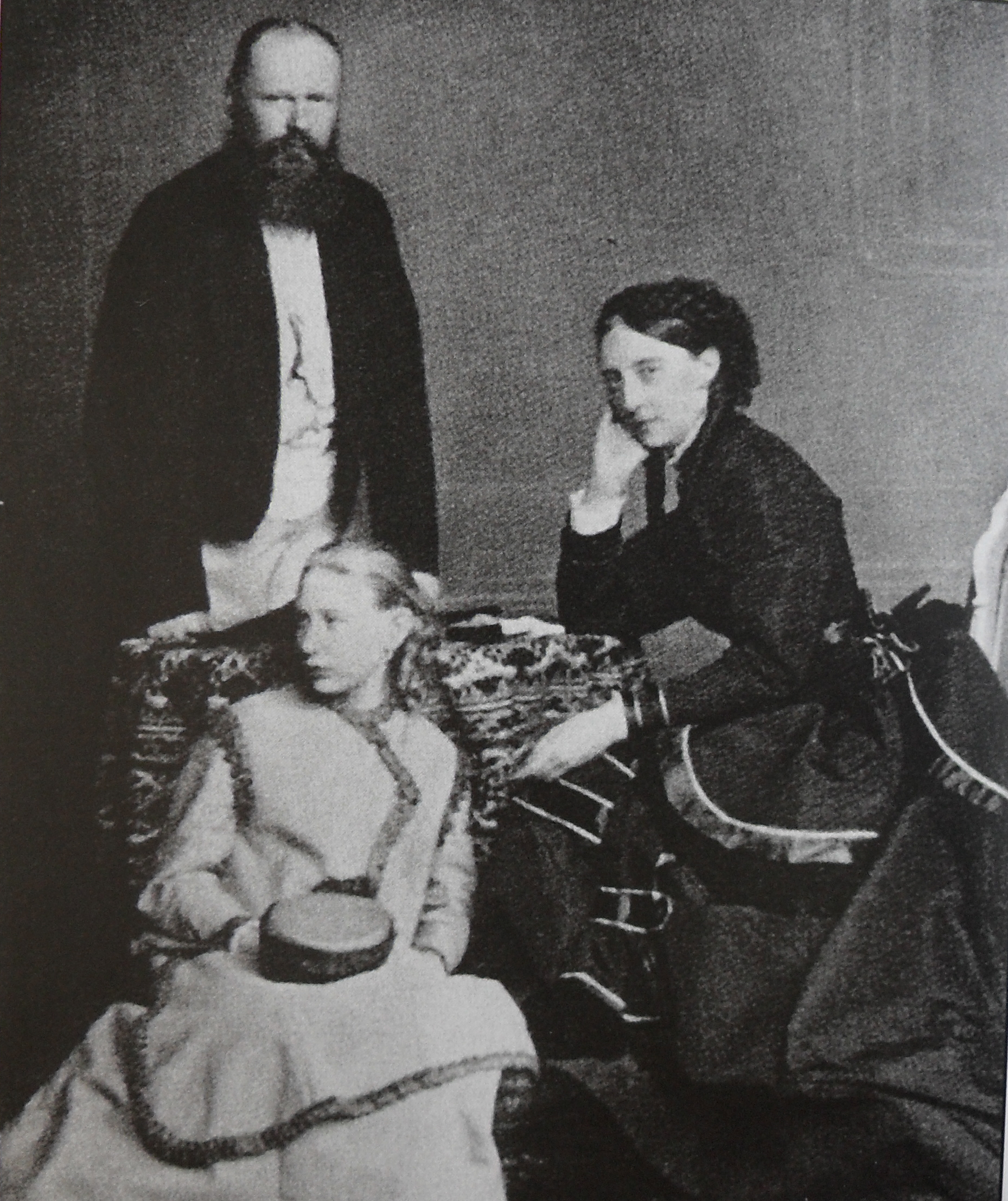
Grand Duchess Vera with her aunt, Grand Duchess Olga and uncle, King Karl of Württemberg, who raised her from the age of nine.

Grand Duchess Vera Konstantinovna of Russia was born in St. Petersburg on 16 February 1854, the third child and second daughter of the six children of Grand Duke Konstantin Nikolayevich of Russia and his wife Grand Duchess Alexandra Iosifovna (born Princess Alexandra of Saxe-Altenburg).

Grand Duchess Vera spent her early years in St Petersburg and in 1861, the family moved to Warsaw when her father was appointed Viceroy of Poland. Vera was a troubled child, prone to violent fits of anger, and suffered what was officially described as a "nervous condition". She became so unmanageable that her parents decided to send her to her aunt, Grand Duchess Olga, Queen of Württemberg, who agreed to take care of her. On 7 December 1863, Grand Duke Constantin and his wife arrived with nine-year-old Vera in Stuttgart, entrusting her care to the childless King Karl of Württemberg and Queen Olga. Officially this was ascribed to the more advanced medical treatment the child would receive in Germany, but it was also a way for Vera's parents to hide her embarrassing illness from the Russian court. Queen Olga was happy to take care of her niece in spite of the difficulties, and for Vera, her aunt eventually took the place of her mother.

Queen Olga and her husband were devoted foster parents, but in the beginning, they had little success in improving the girl's condition. Vera was homesick and continued to be extremely difficult, to the point of being physically violent towards them. Periodically, Vera had to be brought under control by an army officer, and on more than one occasion she was locked up. Karl went for long walks with Vera and read passages from the Bible to her in the evening. By 1866, there was still little improvement in Vera's condition, but Queen Olga persevered and with time, Grand Duchess Vera eventually outgrew her disruptive behavior.

As a young woman, she was introspective, shy, but clever with an intellectual bent. She disliked ceremony. Her physical appearance, like her personality, was rather peculiar. She had thick, curly blonde hair, but was short, stumpy and extremely plain.

Princess Victoria of Hesse and by Rhine described her:

...the Cinderella of the family, being a very plain and naughty little girl. [...] Besides twin daughters she had a baby boy who died young, it was said, partly as a result of his doting mother having dressed him at six months old in a little military uniform to be shown to her regiment at a review. Vera was almost a maniac on soldiers, having made a study of every stripe and button in all the armies of the world. At the same time she was given to writing poetry. When she had to attend a Court function her tiara was secured to head by an elastic and the instant the ceremony was over, she would pull it off and toss it on the sofa, like an old hat."

== Marriage ==
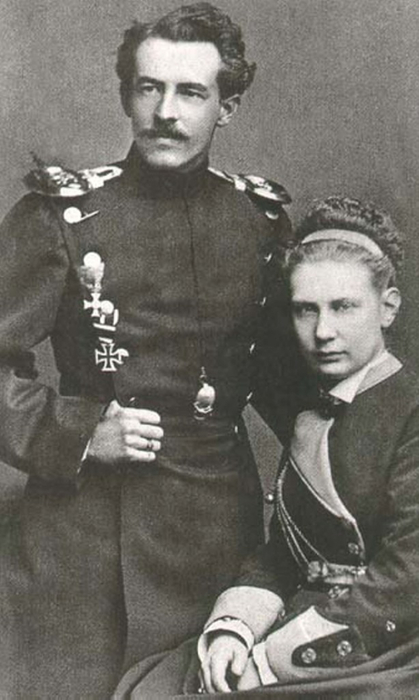
Grand Duchess Vera with her husband, Duke Eugen of Württemberg. 1874.

King Karl and Queen Olga legally adopted Grand Duchess Vera in 1871. They arranged her marriage to a member of the Silesian branch of their family, Duke Eugen of Württemberg (born 20 August 1846 – 27 January 1877), as in this way she would not have to leave the country after her marriage. The couple were distant cousins, as Vera was a great-great-granddaughter of Friedrich II Eugen, Duke of Württemberg twice over; on her father's side and on her mother's.

The engagement took place in January 1874, pleasing both families. Grand Duke Konstantine wrote to the King and Queen profusely thanking them for the help they had given to his daughter. Queen Olga wrote to her friend Marie von Kiderlen-Waechter, "My problem child is now a happy bride, loving and beloved. I never dreamed that such happiness could exist. Eugen is already like a son to the King. I fold my hands and thank God day and night for such a blessing". Even the heir to the Württemberg throne, Prince William, wrote that Vera was the luckiest bride in the world. "While she is very ugly and will always remain so, compared to how she was as a child she is unbelievably improved. I consider her not to be without accomplishments, and, I believe, not without heart."

Vera was nineteen and Eugen was twenty-eight. The wedding was celebrated with great pomp in Stuttgart on 4 May 1874 in the presence of Vera's uncle, Tsar Alexander II, who, noticing the unattractiveness of his niece, remarked ungallantly, "I confess that I do not envy the young husband". He did, however, arrange for Vera's father to settle a million rubles on her as a dowry.

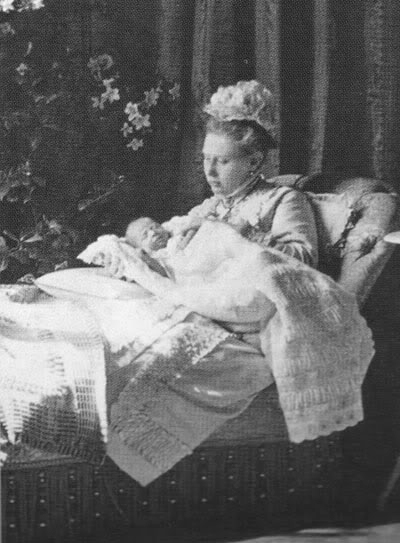
Grand Duchess Vera with her son Charles-Eugen of Württemberg.

The couple settled in a large house, the "Akademie" in Stuttgart. The following year, Vera gave birth to a son, Karl Eugen, who died only seven months later. In 1876, Vera had twin daughters, Elsa and Olga.

However, the Grand Duchess' married life was to be short-lived. Her husband, an officer in the Württemberg army, took charge of command in Düsseldorf, where he died unexpectedly on 27 January 1877. The cause of death was officially given as, alternately, a fall from a horse, and a respiratory illness. However, many believed the Duke, a well-known bon vivant, had actually been killed in a duel, which was hushed up. The marriage lasted three years. Only twenty-three years old, Vera never married again. She reacted to the death of her husband in practical, not grief-stricken terms.

Rather than returning to her native country, the young widow decided to stay in Württemberg, the country she felt to be her own, where she had the protection of the King. However, she traveled frequently to visit her relatives in Russia as well as her only sister, Queen Olga of the Hellenes, in Greece.

At the death of King Karl in 1891, Vera inherited a considerable fortune, and when Queen Olga died a year later, she received Villa Berg in Stuttgart, where she lived in considerable style. She also wrote poetry, and her home was the scene of many cultural as well as family gatherings.

Bright and talkative, Grand Duchess Vera was popular in Württemberg, where she dedicated herself to charitable work. Refuges for fallen women, called "Vera's Homes"; the Benevolent Institution; the Olga Clinic in Stuttgart; the Nicholas nursing station for the blind, the Mariaberg Institute near Reutlingen, the dragoon regiment of her late husband, and a Russian regiment, were among the more than thirty institutions and organizations under her patronage. She was also involved in the construction of the Orthodox Church of St Nicholas in Stuttgart.

== Last years ==
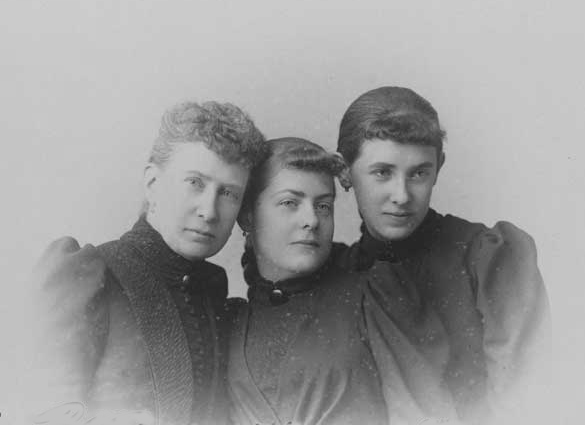
Grand Duchess Vera Constantinovna with her daughters, Elsa (middle) and Olga (right)

Grand Duchess Vera visited Russia often and was present with her daughters in May 1896 during the coronation ceremonies of Tsar Nicholas II. The elder of the twins, Elsa, was first engaged in January 1895 to Hereditary Prince Alfred of Saxe-Coburg-Gotha, a grandson of Queen Victoria. The engagement was quickly broken off, and Elsa married a distant cousin, Prince Albert of Schaumburg-Lippe, brother of Queen Charlotte of Württemberg. The following year, Vera's other daughter, Olga, married her brother-in-law's younger brother, Prince Maximilian of Schaumburg-Lippe. Olga's fate was similar to Vera's; she had three children and within a few years of her marriage, she lost a child and her husband, becoming a widow at an early age and never marrying again.

Aged beyond her years, Grand Duchess Vera was now in poor health. Some authorities now speculate that she suffered from Sydenham's chorea or Saint Vitus Dance, a neurological movement disorder characterized by abrupt, involuntary movements. In Stuttgart Vera was assigned an officer to follow her about, to make sure that if she had an attack she would not fall and injure herself.

By the turn of the century, Vera Constantinova appeared small and dumpy with a fat, round face. She wore her hair very short, which gave her a masculine look. Extremely nearsighted, she wore a pince-nez. She was considered rather eccentric, but she had a good sense of humor and her funny remarks were remembered by her nephews and nieces. She was well liked by her family.

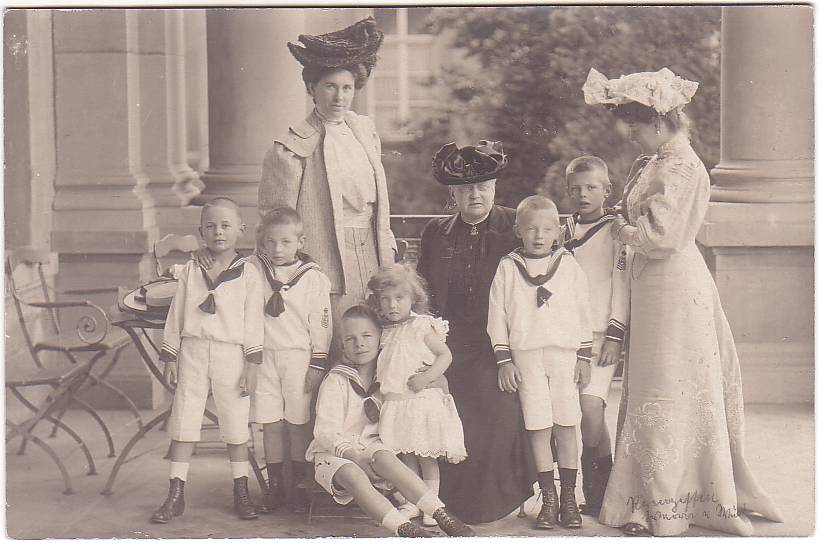
Grand Duchess Vera Constantinovna of Russia (center) with her daughters, Olga (left), Elsa (right) and grandchildren.

After living in Württemberg for so long, she was at odds politically and religiously with her Russian relatives. Her political sympathies lay with Germany and she did not share the increasingly anti-German view of the Romanovs. Vera Konstantinovna was very religious, but had never understood the Orthodox faith and eventually abandoned it to convert to Lutheranism in 1909, to the consternation of the Romanov family. She then commissioned the building of a Protestant church on the grounds of Villa Berg.

In 1903, during the wedding dinner for Princess Alice of Battenberg to her nephew Prince Andrew of Greece in Darmstadt, Prince Christopher recalled "My brother George sat next to her, and at a pause in the proceedings, snatched off her tiara and put it on his own head. Everybody laughed, Aunt Vera included, although she vowed vengeance on the culprit. Her turn came, as she thought, a little later, when the bride and bridegroom started on their honeymoon. We were all gathered at the door, throwing rice at them, when someone knocked off poor Aunt Vera's glasses, which were smashed to atoms on the stone steps." An unfortunate man who happened to be standing next to the Grand Duchess, then became the object of her wrath. She knocked the man's hat off and began to hit him over the head with it.

Grand Duchess Vera Constantinovna suffered a stroke in October 1911. She had a slow recovery and she died in Stuttgart on 11 April 1912 of an acute renal failure, aged fifty-eight. She was deeply mourned as she was the most popular princess of the Royal house of Württemberg.

== Children ==
Grand Duchess Vera and her husband Duke Eugene of Württemberg had three children:

- Charles-Eugen of Württemberg (8 April 1875 – 11 November 1875).
- Elsa of Württemberg (1 March 1876 – 27 May 1936) m. 1897 Albrecht of Schaumburg-Lippe (24 October 1869 – 25 December 1942).
  - Maximilian of Schaumburg-Lippe (28 March 1898 – 4 February 1974)
  - Franz Josef of Schaumburg-Lippe (1 September 1899 – 6 July 1963)
  - Alexander of Schaumburg-Lippe (20 January 1901 – 26 November 1923)
  - Bathildis of Schaumburg-Lippe (11 November 1903 – 29 June 1983)
- Olga of Württemberg (1 March 1876 – 21 October 1932) m. 1898 Maximilian of Schaumburg-Lippe (13 March 1871 – 1 April 1904).
  - Eugen of Schaumburg-Lippe (8 August 1899 – 9 November 1929)
  - Albrecht of Schaumburg-Lippe (17 October 1900 – 20 May 1984)
  - Bernhard of Schaumburg-Lippe (8 December 1902 – 24 June 1903)

== Ancestry ==
Ancestors of Grand Duchess Vera Konstantinovna of Russia

16. Peter III of Russia
8. Paul I of Russia
17. Catherine II of Russia
4. Nicholas I of Russia
18. Frederick II Eugene, Duke of Württemberg (= 28)
9. Sophie Dorothea of Württemberg
19. Margravine Friederike of Brandenburg-Schwedt (= 29)
2. Grand Duke Konstantin Nikolayevich of Russia
20. Frederick William II of Prussia
10. Frederick William III of Prussia
21. Frederika Louisa of Hesse-Darmstadt
5. Charlotte of Prussia
22. Charles II, Grand Duke of Mecklenburg-Strelitz (= 26)
11. Louise of Mecklenburg-Strelitz
23. Princess Friederike of Hesse-Darmstadt (= 27)
1. Grand Duchess Vera Constantinovna of Russia
24. Ernest Frederick III, Duke of Saxe-Hildburghausen
12. Frederick, Duke of Saxe-Altenburg
25. Princess Ernestine of Saxe-Weimar
6. Joseph, Duke of Saxe-Altenburg
26. Charles II, Grand Duke of Mecklenburg-Strelitz (= 22)
13. Duchess Charlotte Georgine of Mecklenburg-Strelitz
27. Princess Friederike of Hesse-Darmstadt (= 23)
3. Princess Alexandra of Saxe-Altenburg
28. Frederick II Eugene, Duke of Württemberg (= 18)
14. Duke Louis of Württemberg
29. Margravine Friederike of Brandenburg-Schwedt (= 19)
7. Duchess Amelia of Württemberg
30. Charles Christian, Prince of Nassau-Weilburg
15. Princess Henriette of Nassau-Weilburg
31. Princess Carolina of Orange-Nassau

== Bibliography ==
- Grand Duchess George of Russia. A Romanov Diary. Atlantic International Publications, 1988. ISBN 0-938311-09-3
- Jena, Detlef. Koenigin Olga von Wuerttemberg: Glueck und Leid ("Queen Olga of Wuerttemberg: Happiness and Pain"). Pustet, 2009. ISBN 3-7917-2228-X
- Thomsen, Sabine. Die Württembergischen Koeniginnen. Tübigen, Silberburg Verlag GmbH, 2006. ISBN 3-87407-714-4.
