= Duchess Elsa of Württemberg =

Princess Albert of Schaumburg-Lippe (1876–1936)

- Princess Albert of Schaumburg-Lippe
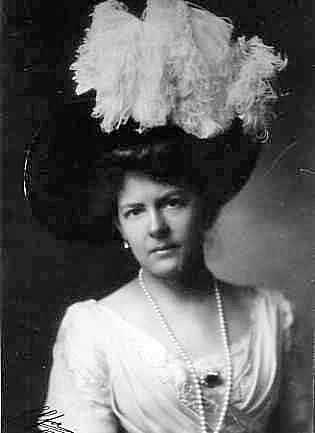
- Elsa c. 1905
- Born: 1 March 1876; Stuttgart, Kingdom of Württemberg, German Empire
- Died: 27 May 1936 (aged 60); Pfaffstätt, Austria
- Spouse: Prince Albert of Schaumburg-Lippe (m. 1897)
- Issue Detail: Prince Max; Prince Franz Josef; Prince Alexander; Bathildis, Princess of Schaumburg-Lippe
Names
- German: Elsa Mathilde Marie
- House: Württemberg
- Father: Duke Eugen of Württemberg
- Mother: Grand Duchess Vera Konstantinovna of Russia

Duchess Elsa of Württemberg (Elsa Mathilde Marie; 1 March 1876 – 27 May 1936) was a daughter of Duke Eugen of Württemberg and Grand Duchess Vera Constantinovna of Russia. She married Prince Albert of Schaumburg-Lippe.

== Early life and family ==
Duchess Elsa was born at Stuttgart, Kingdom of Württemberg, the elder twin daughter of Duke Eugen of Württemberg (1846–1877) (son of Duke Eugen of Württemberg and Princess Mathilde of Schaumburg-Lippe) and his wife, Grand Duchess Vera Constantinovna of Russia (1854–1912) (daughter of Grand Duke Konstantin Nikolayevich of Russia and Princess Alexandra of Saxe-Altenburg). Her younger twin sister was Duchess Olga of Württemberg (1876–1932).

== Failed engagement ==
On January 28, 1895, the British Court Circular published the following: "We are informed that a marriage has been arranged between His Royal Highness Prince Alfred of Saxe-Coburg and Gotha, only son of their Royal Highnesses the Duke and Duchess of Saxe-Coburg and Gotha and grandson of her Majesty, and Her Royal Highness the Duchess Elsa Matilda Marie, elder twin daughter of the late Duke William Eugene of Württemberg by his marriage with his cousin the Grand Duchess Vera of Russia." The marriage did not take place.

== Marriage and issue ==
On 6 May 1897, in Stuttgart, she married Prince Albert of Schaumburg-Lippe (1869–1942), son of Prince William of Schaumburg-Lippe and Princess Bathildis of Anhalt-Dessau. They had four children:

- Prince Max of Schaumburg-Lippe (28 March 1898 – 4 February 1974), married in 1933 to Helga Lee Roderbourg, no issue;
- Prince Franz Josef of Schaumburg-Lippe (1 September 1899 – 7 July 1963), married in 1959 to Maria Theresia Peschel, no issue;
- Prince Alexander of Schaumburg-Lippe (20 January 1901 – 26 November 1923);
- Princess Bathildis of Schaumburg-Lippe (11 November 1903 – 29 June 1983), married in 1925 to Wolrad, Prince of Schaumburg-Lippe, had issue, including Philipp-Ernst, Prince of Schaumburg-Lippe.

== Ancestry ==
Ancestors of Duchess Elsa of Württemberg

8. Duke Eugen of Württemberg
4. Duke Eugen of Württemberg
9. Princess Mathilde of Waldeck and Pyrmont
2. Duke Eugen of Württemberg
10. George William, Prince of Schaumburg-Lippe
5. Princess Mathilde of Schaumburg-Lippe
11. Princess Ida of Waldeck and Pyrmont
1. Duchess Elsa of Württemberg
12. Nicholas I of Russia
6. Grand Duke Konstantin Nikolayevich of Russia
13. Princess Charlotte of Prussia
3. Grand Duchess Vera Constantinovna of Russia
14. Joseph, Duke of Saxe-Altenburg
7. Princess Alexandra of Saxe-Altenburg
15. Duchess Amelia of Württemberg

== Notes and sources ==
- The Royal House of Stuart, London, 1969, 1971, 1976, Addington, A. C., Reference: 223
