= Lady Georgiana Curzon =

English socialite (1910-1976)

Lady Starkey
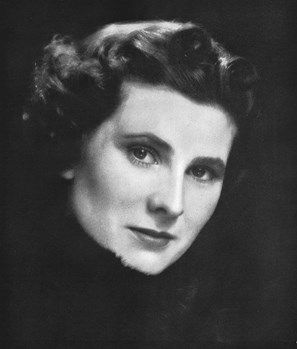

Personal details
- Born: Hon. Georgiana Mary Curzon; 7 January 1910 Mayfair, London, England
- Died: 11 January 1976 (aged 66) The Retreat, York, England
- Spouse(s): Home Ronald Archibald Kidston (m. 1935; div. 1943) Lord Lewis Stanton Starkey (m. 1957; died 1975)
- Children: Glen Kidston
- Parent(s): Francis Curzon, 5th Earl Howe; Mary Curzon, Lady Howe
- Relatives: Richard Curzon, 4th Earl Howe (grandfather); Montagu Curzon (grandfather)

Lady Georgiana Mary Curzon Kidston, Lady Starkey (7 January 1910 – 11 January 1976), was an English socialite, included in The Book of Beauty (1930) by Cecil Beaton.

== Early life ==
Lady Georgiana Mary Curzon was born in 1910 at Curzon House (21 Curzon Street), Mayfair, the daughter of Viscount Howe (later 5th Earl Howe) and Mary, Viscountess Howe, half–first cousins once removed who married in 1907 and divorced in 1937. Her older brother was Edward Curzon, 6th Earl Howe.

Her paternal grandparents were Richard Curzon, 4th Earl Howe, and his first wife, Lady Georgiana Spencer-Churchill (fifth daughter of John Spencer-Churchill, 7th Duke of Marlborough, and Lady Frances Vane). Her mother was the only daughter of Esmé FitzRoy and Col. Montagu Curzon (the eldest son, by his second wife, of Richard Curzon-Howe, 1st Earl Howe).

== Career ==
In the 1930s Lady Georgiana Curzon modelled for Pond's and Copley's.

In 1933, Lady Georgiana Curzon, Miss Deirdre Hart-Davis, the Lady Anne Wellesley and Miss Nancy Beaton were photographed together for The Book of Beauty of Cecil Beaton.

== Personal life ==
In 1934, she met Roger Bushell and they fell in love. Curzon's father did not approve and forced her to marry the son of a family friend; they eventually divorced in 1943, during Bushell's captivity. In November 1935, Georgiana Curzon married Home Kidston. Before their divorce in 1943, they had one son:

- Glen Kidston (1937–2018), who was educated at Eton and Christ Church, Oxford.

The marriage was unhappy, Kidston apparently admitted adultery with Curzon's stepmother, and they eventually divorced in 1943. Bushell never forgot Curzon and it has been said that he was telling his fellow prisoners that "Georgie" was his true love and that he would one day marry her. Unfortunately, Bushell was killed by the Gestapo in 1944, his story life recounted in The Great Escape, in which his role is played by Richard Attenborough. For years after his death, Curzon placed an "In Memoriam" advertisement in The Times on his birthday signing "Love is Immortal, Georgie". Words in similar vein are referred to in an article in The Times in 2013, by Simon Pearson, about Bushell's lovers. He remarked that he had some years before, while working at The Times, come:

. . . across a memorial notice in the archive, which marked the anniversary of Roger Bushell's birth and celebrated his life. It quoted Rupert Brooke: "He leaves a white unbroken glory, a gathered radiance, a width, a shining peace, under the night." It was signed "Georgie".

On 1 November 1957 she married Lord Lewis Stanton Starkey (1906–1975), a son of Lt.-Col. Lewis Edward Starkey and Mary Kathleen Starkey. Lord Starkey was previously married to Clare Désirée Blow (daughter of architect Detmar Jellings Blow).

She died in 1976 at The Retreat, in York. She is buried at Holy Trinity, Penn Street, and on the tombstone there are two lines by Tennyson: "Oh for the touch of a vanished hand, and the sound of a voice that is still".
