= Home Kidston =

British naval officer and racing driver (1910–1996)

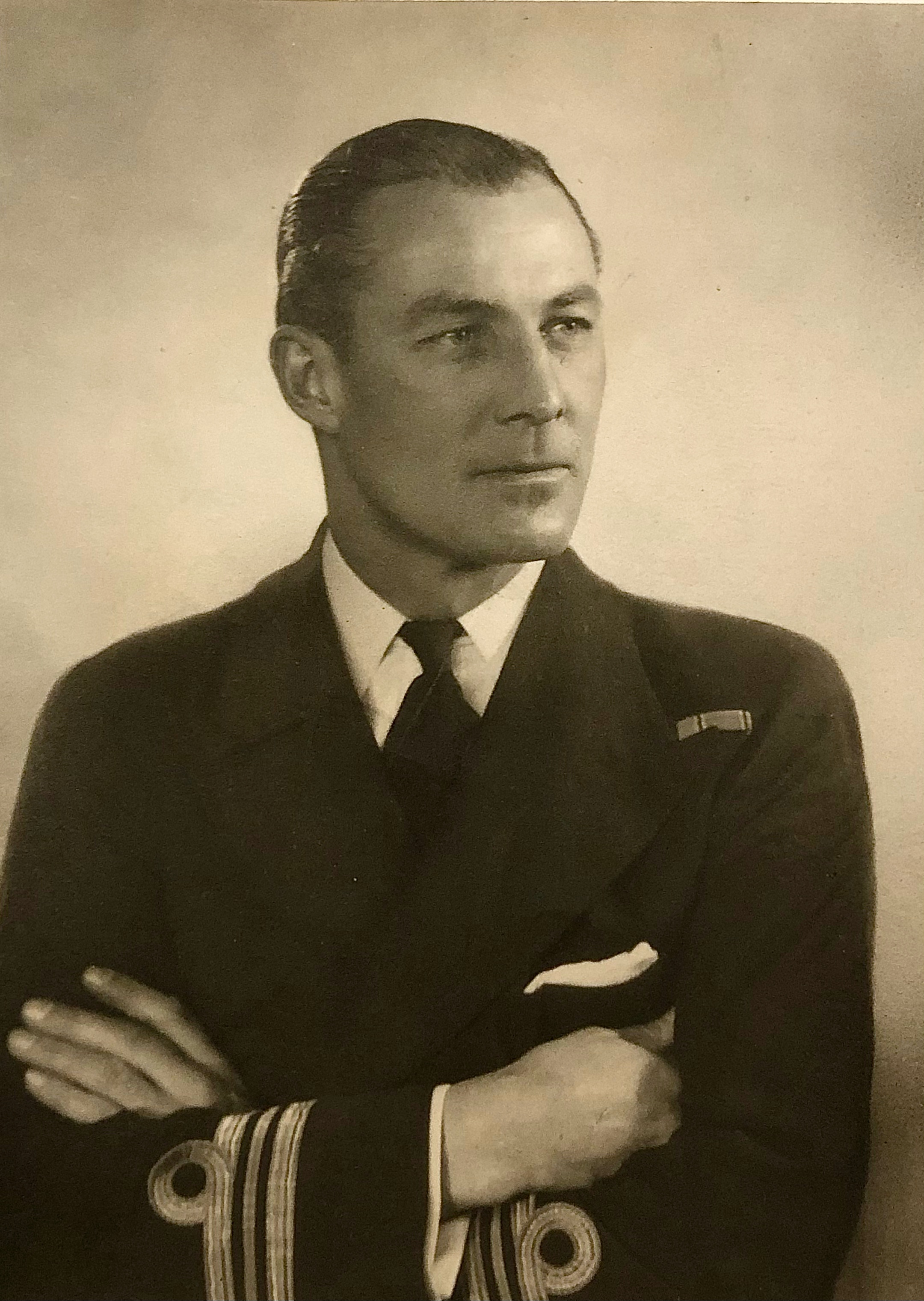
- Born: Home Ronald Archibald Kidston; 11 March 1910; Cadogan Square, London, England
- Died: January 1996 (aged 85–86)
- Education: Eton
- Occupations: Royal navy officer, farmer and racing driver
- Title: Lieutenant-Commander
- Spouse(s): Lady Georgiana Curzon; Eleanor Keith; Erica Lanz
- Children: 3, including Simon Kidston
- Relatives: Glen Kidston (brother)

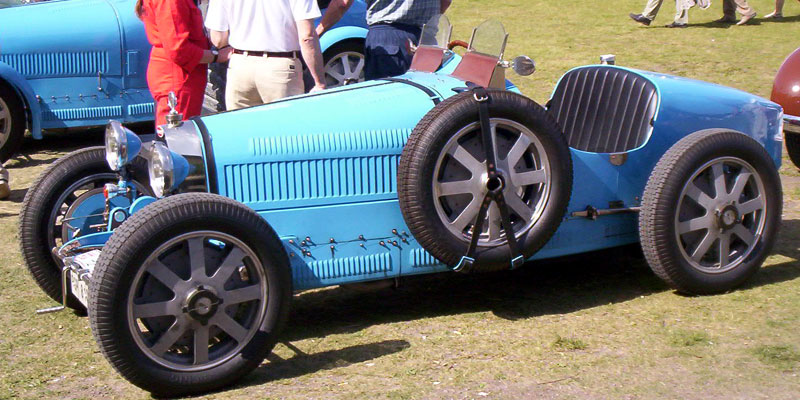
Bugatti Type 37A

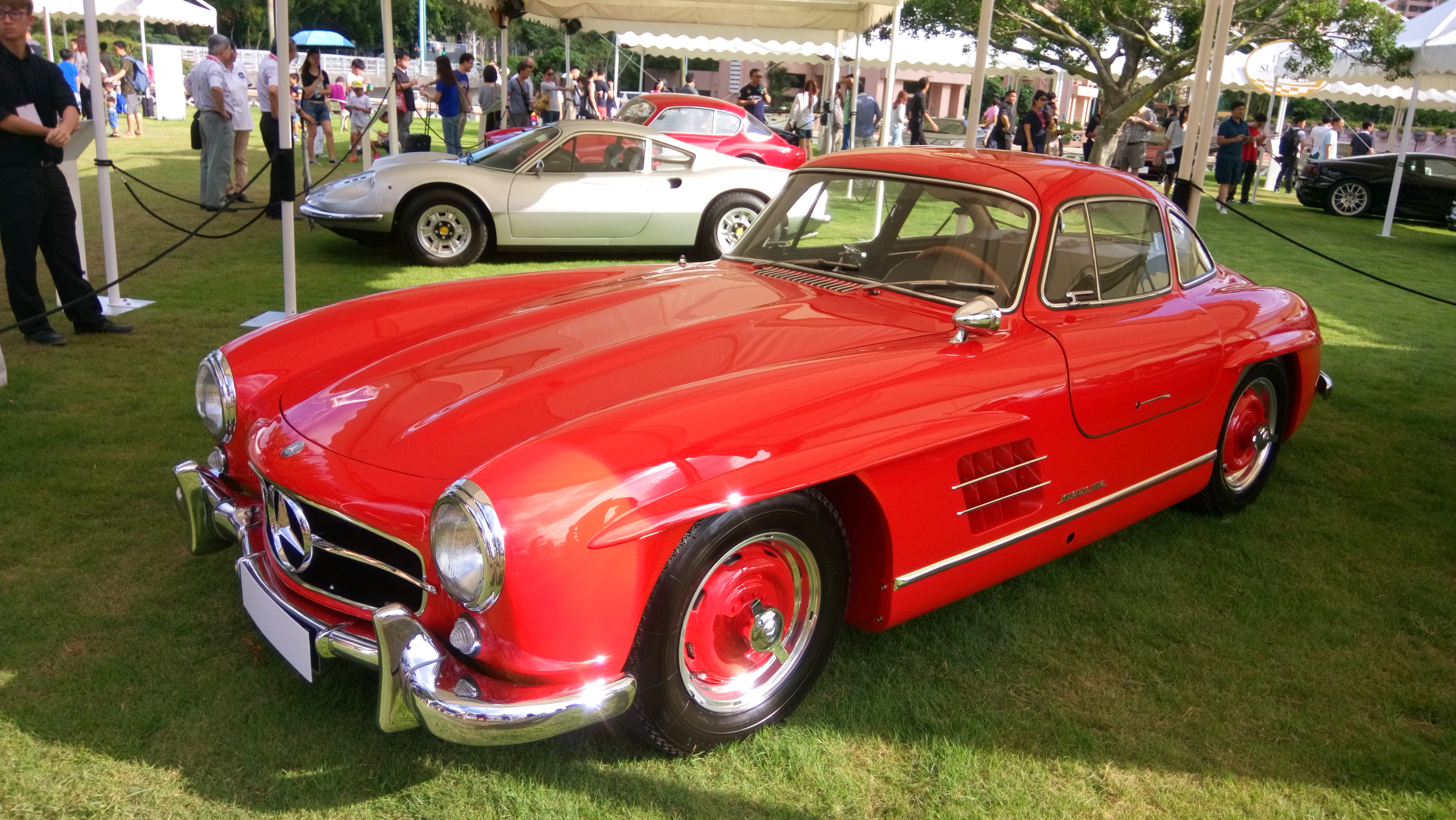
Mercedes Benz 300SL gull-wing coupe

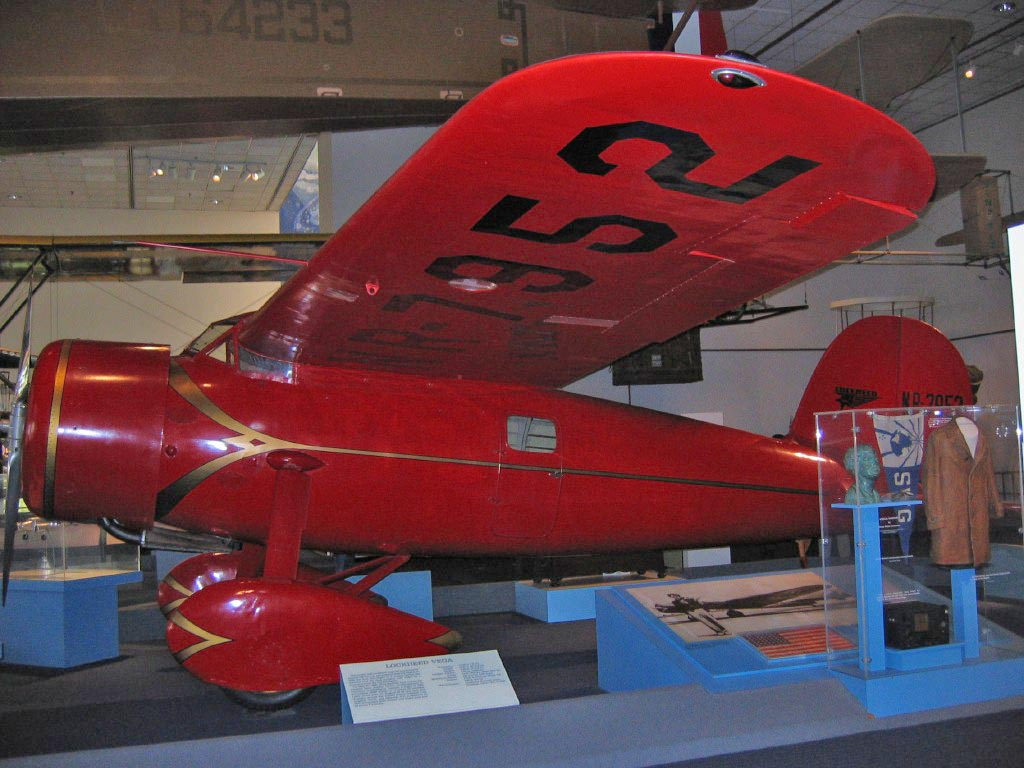
Lockheed Vega

Lieutenant-Commander Home Ronald Archibald Kidston (11 March 1910 – January 1996) was a Royal Navy officer, farmer and racing driver.

== Early life ==
Kidston was born on 11 March 1910 in Cadogan Square, London, the son of Captain Archibald Glen Kidston and Hélène Adeline Blanche Chapman. His older brother was Glen Kidston, the record-breaking aviator and motor racing driver.

He was educated at Eton.

== Career ==
=== Royal Navy ===
Kidston joined the Royal Navy, being promoted from acting sub-lieutenant to sub-lieutenant on 1 January 1932, and to lieutenant on 1 July 1934.

During the Second World War, he commanded the motor anti-submarine boat MA/SB.6, as part of the 2nd Motor Anti-Submarine Boat Flotilla, based at Portland in 1940. He then served as Anti-Submarine Officer aboard HMS Kelly, under Lord Mountbatten, from February 1941 until her sinking off Crete on 23 May 1941. Kidston was promoted to lieutenant-commander on 1 July 1942, and later commanded his own destroyer, HMS Escapade from October 1944 until December 1945. He retired from the Navy on 21 January 1947.

=== Farmer ===
In 1947, Kidston retired to farm his estate at Southover House, Tolpuddle, Dorset. In 1976, he moved to Italy to grow olives and wine at Il Gallinaio, near Siena.

== Cars ==
Aged 14, he acquired a Morgan three-wheeler, and while a student at Eton, a Type 37A Bugatti. After he joined the Royal Navy, he bought an MG K3 and a Bentley 4½. He was later posted to New Zealand, and "raised eyebrows" when he arrived with his de Havilland DH.60 Moth aircraft, Vosper racing speedboat and a Mercedes-Benz S. His on-road speeding antics earned him much coverage in the New Zealand press and various far-flung court appearances which his aircraft proved useful for attending. After he returned to England, he raced a Type 51 Bugatti and the ex-Howe Alfa Romeo 2.3 Le Mans car, and entering several Frazer Nash BMWs in Alpine trials. His later road cars included a Bugatti 57C, a Lancia Aurelia B20 GT, a Mercedes-Benz 300SL and a Porsche Carrera 2.7RS. Kidston ordered his Type 57C from the Bugatti showroom in Nice in 1938 while on shore leave, and it was delivered to England the following year. He sold it in 1955. Kidston was one of the first in the UK to purchase a Mercedes-Benz 300SL Gullwing coupé, in April 1955.

== Aircraft ==
Also a keen pilot, Kidston owned a de Havilland DH.60M Moth G-AAXG (c/n 1542) which was built in 1930 for de Havilland company chairman Alan S. Butler, who flew it in the 1930 King's Cup Air Race and finished second, as well as won the prize for the highest speed achieved at 129.7 miles per hour (208.7 km/h). Kidston shipped the Moth to New Zealand in 1933, selling it there in 1935.

In June 1934 Kidston registered his brother's Lockheed Vega (G-ABGK) to take part in the MacRobertson Air Race from England to Australia. However, it was an Australian, Jimmie Woods, who actually flew the aircraft in the race, which overturned on landing at Aleppo, and was forced to withdraw.

In 1936 he bought the DH.85 Leopard Moth G-AEFR (c/n 7125), based at Brooklands. Kidston continued to fly into his 70s.

== Boats ==
In 1959 Kidston acquired a 46-foot-2-inch (14.07 m) John G. Alden-designed motor yacht (Design No. 916) which he named Pasadena, built for him by R. & W. Clark Ltd. of East Cowes.

== Personal life ==
His first wife was Lady Georgiana Mary Curzon, the daughter of Francis Curzon, 5th Earl Howe and Mary Curzon, Lady Howe. They had one son, Glen Kidston (b. 1937), and divorced in 1943. His second wife was American heiress Eleanor Keith. He later married Erica Lanz and had two children, Simon Kidston (b. 1967), the classic car dealer, and Nicholas Kidston (b. 1969), who died in a motorcycle accident in 2011. Kidston had 3 grandchildren, Cassius Kidston and Constance Kidston (Simon Kidston) and Sofia Kidston (Nicholas Kidston).
