= Danielle Curzon =

British bodyguard and MMA referee

- Born: 1983 (age 42–43)
- Occupations: Bodyguard, MMA referee
- Parents: Peter Curzon (father); Karen Osborne (mother)

The Honourable Danielle Solange Clara Curzon (born 1983) is a British bodyguard and MMA referee. She is the first female Mixed Martial Arts referee in the United Kingdom. She referees on the MMA circuit at UCMMA Cage Rage. In June 2012, Curzon earned a licence to referee MMA bouts in Indiana.

== Biography ==
Curzon is the only child of Peter Curzon, 4th Viscount Scarsdale and Karen Osborne. She lives in Lincolnshire where she runs bouncer courses. She has acted as the bodyguard for notable Hollywood stars including Natalie Portman, Kate Hudson, and Emma Watson.
