= Geo. F. Trumper =

British men's barber and perfumer in London, England

Coordinates: 51.5070°N 0.1465°W

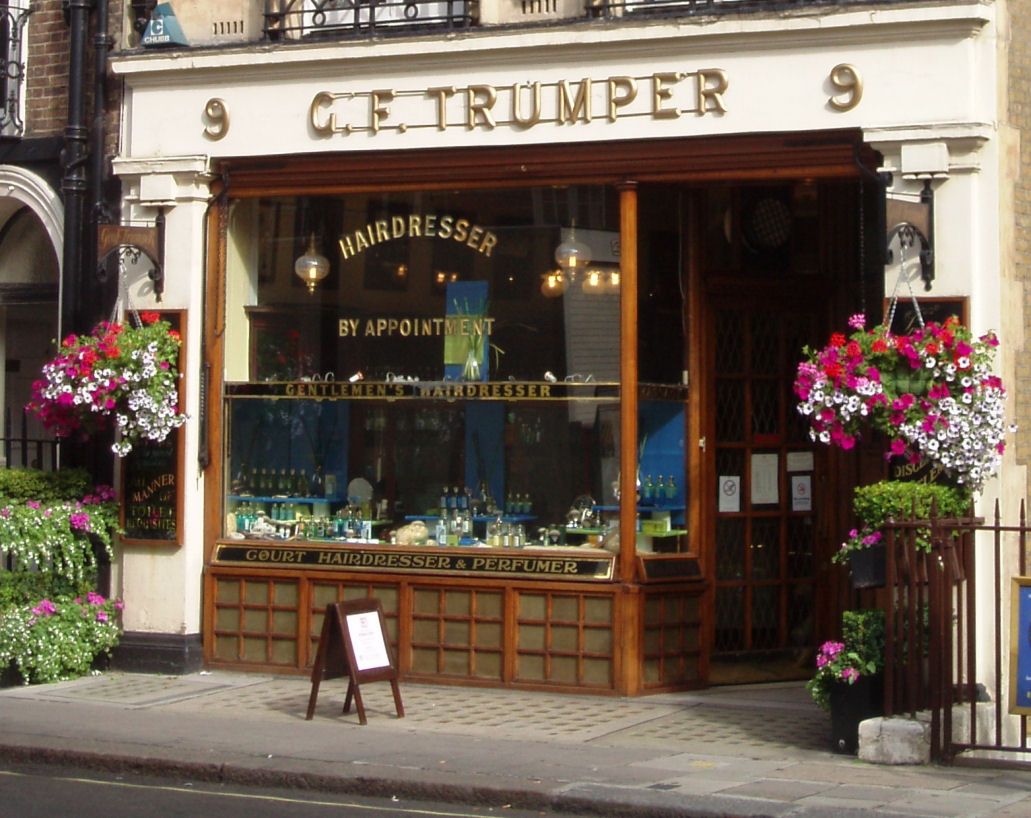
The original Geo. F. Trumper shop at 9 Curzon Street in Mayfair, London

Geo. F. Trumper is a British men's barber and perfumer in London, England, which sells its own brand of men's fragrances and personal grooming products. It was established in 1875 by George Francis William Trumper as a gentlemen's barber shop.

== Locations ==
Geo. F. Trumper operates two retail locations in London. The first one is in the original shop at 9 Curzon Street in Mayfair, and the second one is at 1 Duke of York Street in St James's. At the shop in Curzon Street, the interior retains the original mahogany cubicles and glass display cases that were installed in the 20th century. The firm's head office is located at 166 Fairbridge Road in north London.

== In popular culture ==
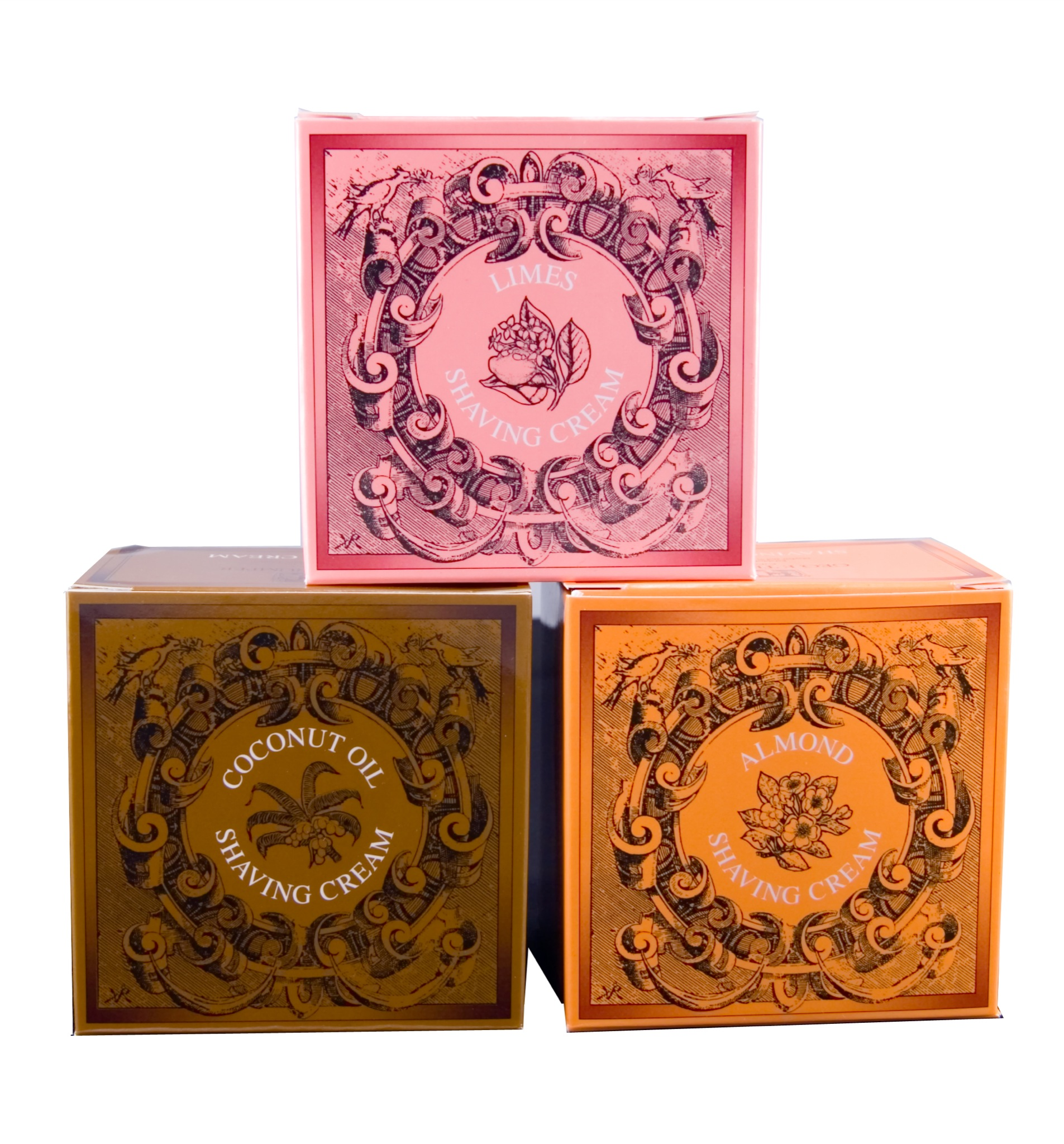
Boxes of Trumper shaving creams

Evelyn Waugh refers to Geo. F. Trumper in his novel Brideshead Revisited, when he writes that Rex Mottram sends for a man from the establishment to shave Charles Ryder, Sebastian Flyte and Boy Mulcaster after they were held in jail on charges of driving while intoxicated.

In the James Bond novel On Her Majesty's Secret Service, Ian Fleming mentions a fragrance by Geo. F. Trumper, when Bond visits Marc-Ange Draco in Marseille and finds a bottle of Eucris in his bathroom.

In John le Carré's novel Tinker Tailor Soldier Spy, George Smiley is intercepted by a disagreeable minor character who had just had his hair cut at Trumper's establishment in Curzon Street.

In the "How Does Your Garden Grow?" episode of Agatha Christie's Poirot (season 3, episode 1), Hercule Poirot is seen leaving Trumper's Curzon Street shop after buying a fragrance there.
