= Glen Kidston =

British aviator and racing driver (1899–1931)

- Nationality: (United Kingdom) British
- Born: George Pearson Glen Kidston; 23 June 1899; Builth Wells, Wales
- Died: 5 May 1931 (aged 32); Drakensberg, South Africa

24 Hours of Le Mans career
- Years: 1929–1930
- Teams: Bentley Motors Ltd.
- Best finish: 1st (1930)
- Class wins: 1 (1930)

George Pearson Glen Kidston (23 June 1899 – 5 May 1931) was a British motor racing driver and aviator who completed a record-breaking flight from Netheravon, Wiltshire to Cape Town, South Africa, in 1931. He was one of the "Bentley Boys".

== Career ==
His father, Archibald Glen Kidston, was a grandson of the original A. G. Kidston, founder of the firm A.G. Kidston & Co, who was a metal and machinery merchant in Glasgow with interests in the Clyde Shipping Company, local solicitors, accountants and banking interests amalgamated into the Clydesdale Bank. Kidston was a member of the well-known Bentley Boys of the late 1920s, and possibly the wealthiest of that already wealthy set. Kidston was one of the four, core Grosvenor Square-based Bentley team drivers, whose day-long parties passed into contemporary legend.

A lieutenant commander in the Royal Navy, he was torpedoed twice (in the consecutive sinkings of HMS Aboukir and Hogue) in the same morning during the action of 22 September 1914 against German submarine U-9 under the command of Commander Otto Weddigen. Following repatriation he served in the dreadnought HMS Orion, with the British Grand Fleet at the Battle of Jutland, running gunnery orders on open deck under direct enemy fire. Kidston served on several leading-edge British submarines, including the notorious X1, which he served on in North Sea trials. During the trials the X1 became embedded in the seabed as its gauges were faulty. In December 1926 he received command of an H-class submarine, the Beardmore-built H24. Away from his duties as a submariner, he was an early pioneer of naval flight.

Kidston competed in numerous motor races including the Monte Carlo Rally, Isle of Man TT motorcycle races, and Shelsley Walsh hillclimb. As a naval amateur he raced a Sunbeam motorcycle up the hill climb in Hong Kong and conducted speed trials on the sands, bringing the bike with him in his submarine which was patrolling the China Station. Kidston entered the 1929 Irish Grand Prix Éireann Cup at Phoenix Park but was narrowly beaten by the Alfa Romeo of former Russian Imperial Guard officer Boris Ivanowski. This was achieved at the expense of Britons Glen Kidston and Henry Birkin, whose Bentleys were second and third respectively. He also owned and raced the first Bugatti in the UK and entered the Le Mans 24-hour race in 1929 and 1930. On the second occasion he won the race, driving a Bentley Speed Six in partnership with Woolf Barnato, with the Bentley team delivering a 1-2-3-4 victory.

In 1929, Kidston was travelling from Croydon to Amsterdam aboard a German airliner when, 21 minutes into the flight, he sensed an imminent crash and assumed the safety position. On impact, Kidston kicked his way out of the fuselage while his clothing was burning and extinguished the flames by rolling in the wet grass. He was the sole survivor, and was hospitalised with extensive burns. The plane's co-pilot, Prince Eugen of Schaumburg-Lippe, was ejected from the plane and initially survived, but died of his injuries the next day.

Kidston was a renowned big game hunter and expert shot, and travelled on pioneering safaris in remote Kenyan districts. Films of these expeditions, of his early naval and other aviation and Bentley teamwork are held at the British Film Institute due to their quality and pioneering footage.

In April 1931, Kidston completed a record-breaking flight from Netheravon, Wiltshire, to Cape Town, South Africa. He completed the journey in 6½ days, flying his own specially adapted Lockheed Vega monoplane and averaging 131 miles per hour (211 km/h). However, Kidston was never to make the return trip. After earlier near misses in aeroplane, motorcycle, speed boat and even submarine accidents, Kidston was killed, only a year after his Le Mans triumph, when his borrowed de Havilland Puss Moth broke up in mid-air while flying through a dust storm over the Drakensberg mountains.

News of Kidston's death broke in the London evening papers and Margaret Whigham (later Duchess of Argyll) and Barbara Cartland, both amongst Kidston's lovers, claim in their memoirs to have fainted on leaving the theatre and seeing the headlines. The Hollywood femme fatale Pola Negri is also reputed to have known Kidston.

== Family ==
He married Nancy Miriel Denise Soames in 1925 and had a son, Archibald Martin Glen (1927–1978). Cath Kidston is his granddaughter. His nephew is classic car dealer, collector, commentator and journalist, Simon Kidston.

== Memorials ==
Kidston's gravestone at St. Peter's in Glasbury-upon-Wye on the Welsh borders, his childhood home, reads "Time and tide wait for no man", and has a sundial. A memorial to him, an aluminium propeller set in stone, stands at the crash site (28.24850°S 29.39214°E).

== Racing record ==
=== Complete 24 Hours of Le Mans results ===
Year	Team	Co-Drivers	Car	Class	Laps	Pos.	Class Pos.
1929	(United Kingdom) Bentley Motors Ltd	(United Kingdom) Jack Dunfee	Bentley 4½ Litre	5.0	167	2nd	1st
1930	(United Kingdom) Bentley Motors Ltd	(United Kingdom) Woolf Barnato	Bentley Speed Six	>3.0	179	1st	1st

Sporting positions
Preceded by Woolf Barnato; Tim Birkin	Winner of the 24 Hours of Le Mans; 1930 with: Woolf Barnato	Succeeded by Earl Howe; Tim Birkin
