= Curzon-Howe =

Curzon-Howe is a surname, and may refer to:

- Assheton Curzon-Howe (1850–1911), British naval officer
- George Curzon-Howe, 2nd Earl Howe (1821–1876), British politician and peer
- Richard Curzon-Howe, 1st Earl Howe (1796–1870), British peer and courtier
- Richard Curzon-Howe, 3rd Earl Howe (1822–1900), British Army officer and peer
