= Mary Curzon, Countess Howe =

English aristocrat (1887–1962)

The Right Honourable The Countess Howe
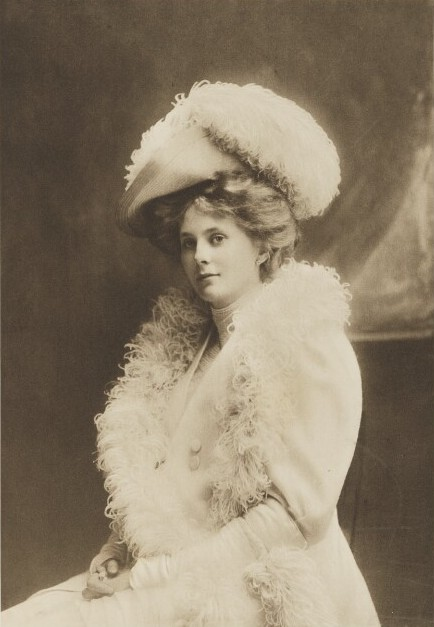
- Photograph of Lady Howe, 1909

Personal details
- Born: Mary Curzon; October 30, 1887
- Died: September 1, 1962 (aged 74)
- Spouse: Francis Curzon, 5th Earl Howe (m. 1907; div. 1937)
- Children: Edward Curzon, 6th Earl Howe; Lady Georgiana Curzon
- Parent(s): Montagu Curzon; Esmé FitzRoy
- Relatives: Richard Curzon-Howe, 1st Earl Howe (grandfather)
- Nickname: Queen of Beauty

Mary Curzon, Countess Howe (30 October 1887 – 1 September 1962) was an English aristocrat dubbed by the newspapers the Queen of Beauty.

== Early life ==
Mary Curzon was born on 30 October 1887, the only daughter of Esmé FitzRoy and Col. Montagu Curzon, the eldest son, by his second wife, of Richard Curzon-Howe, 1st Earl Howe. Her brother, William Montagu Curzon-Herrick, was married to Lady Maud Hastings (daughter of Warner Hastings, 15th Earl of Huntingdon).

Her maternal grandfather was Francis Horatio FitzRoy (son of Admiral Lord William FitzRoy and grandson of Prime Minister Augustus FitzRoy, 3rd Duke of Grafton).

== Personal life ==
On 28 October 1907 she married her first cousin, who was then known as Francis, Viscount Curzon (1884–1964). Francis was the son, and later heir, of Richard Curzon, 4th Earl Howe and his first wife Lady Georgiana Elizabeth Spencer-Churchill (fifth daughter of John Spencer-Churchill, 7th Duke of Marlborough and Lady Frances Vane). Before their divorce in 1937, they were the parents of:

- Edward Richard Assheton Penn Curzon, who inherited the title.
- Lady Georgiana Curzon (1910–1976), who married Home Kidston, a Royal Navy officer and racing driver. After their 1943 divorce, she married Lord Lewis Stanton Starkey in 1957.

Lady Howe died on 1 September 1962. Upon her ex-husband's death in 1964, her son, Edward inherited the title and became the 6th Earl Howe.

=== Reputation ===
In 1912, she was dubbed the "Queen of Beauty," when she appeared in that role in Patsy Cornwallis-West's Eglinton Tournament at Shakespeare's England. The newspapers talked about her as one of the loveliest women in England ever. "England's most beautiful peeress," and "A perfect specimen of English beauty".

In The Book Of Beauty by Cecil Beaton, Lady Howe is described as "the elegance of the aristocrat combined with the excessive prettiness that accompanies carnation-pink cheeks and yellow hair. She is gracefully statuesque, her height is superb, her neck swan-like, and her poreless complexion is like icing-sugar on a birthday cake. [...] there is no living beauty who can create more of an effect than she when entering a ballroom or sitting in a box at the opera."
