= Simon Kidston =

British car collector

- Born: September 1967 (age 58)
- Education: Aiglon College
- Occupation: classic car dealer
- Spouse: Rosie Kidston
- Children: 2
- Parent: Home Kidston
- Relatives: Glen Kidston (uncle); Cath Kidston (cousin)

Simon Home Kidston (born September 1967) is a British classic car dealer, collector, commentator and journalist.

Kidston has built a reputation as one of the leading international dealers in blue-chip collector cars, with clients including Ralph Lauren, Ferrari collector Jean-Pierre Slavic and designer Marc Newson.

== Early life ==
Kidston was born in September 1967, the son of Commander Home Kidston, a retired naval officer who owned and raced cars. His uncle was Bentley Boy Glen Kidston, the record-breaking aviator and motor racing driver. His cousin is the fashion designer and businesswoman Cath Kidston.

Kidston grew up near Siena, Italy and was educated in Switzerland. He attended Aiglon College from 1981 to 1985.

== Career ==
Kidston started his career in 1988 in the car auction department at Coys of Kensington.

In 1996, he left to co-found Brooks Europe auction house in Geneva. He created high-profile events such as the annual Ferrari auction in Gstaad and the Pur Sang à Longchamp auction in Paris. From 1996 to 2006 he was President of Brooks Europe, which later became Bonhams Europe.

In 2006, Kidston left Bonhams to start Kidston SA in Geneva, an independent advisory firm for motor car collectors. In 2018, Kidston opened a new office in Dubai: Kidston DMCC.

== Other roles ==
Kidston is a magazine contributor, writing columns for 'Classic Cars' and 'Sports Car Market'. He is also a guest contributor at Vanity Fair, Top Gear and Dubai Lifestyle Magazine.

Kidston is head judge of the Cartier Travel With Style Concours in India and an advisor to BMW Classic, the organisers of the Concorso d'Eleganza Villa d'Este, set up in 1929. Between 2007 and 2014, he was commentator for the Mille Miglia historic rally.

== Personal life ==
Kidston is an avid car collector, with his collection including a 1938 Bugatti Type 57C Cabriolet originally built for his father. Kidston buys back vehicles his family previously owned, including a Gipsy Moth racing biplane his father flew in New Zealand 75 years prior.

In 2009, Kidston was invited by the Mercedes-Benz Museum to drive the 300 SLR 'Uhlenhaut' coupe.

He splits his time between Dubai, London, Milan and Geneva, and is fluent in Italian and French.

== Recent purchases ==
On May 5, 2022, Kidston purchased the 1955 Mercedes-Benz 300 SLR Uhlenhaut Coupé for an unnamed customer for a record breaking 135 Million Euro (About US$142.5 million).
