= Francis Curzon, 5th Earl Howe =

British naval officer, politician, and racing driver (1884–1964)

Commodore The Right Honourable The Earl Howe CBE RD PC
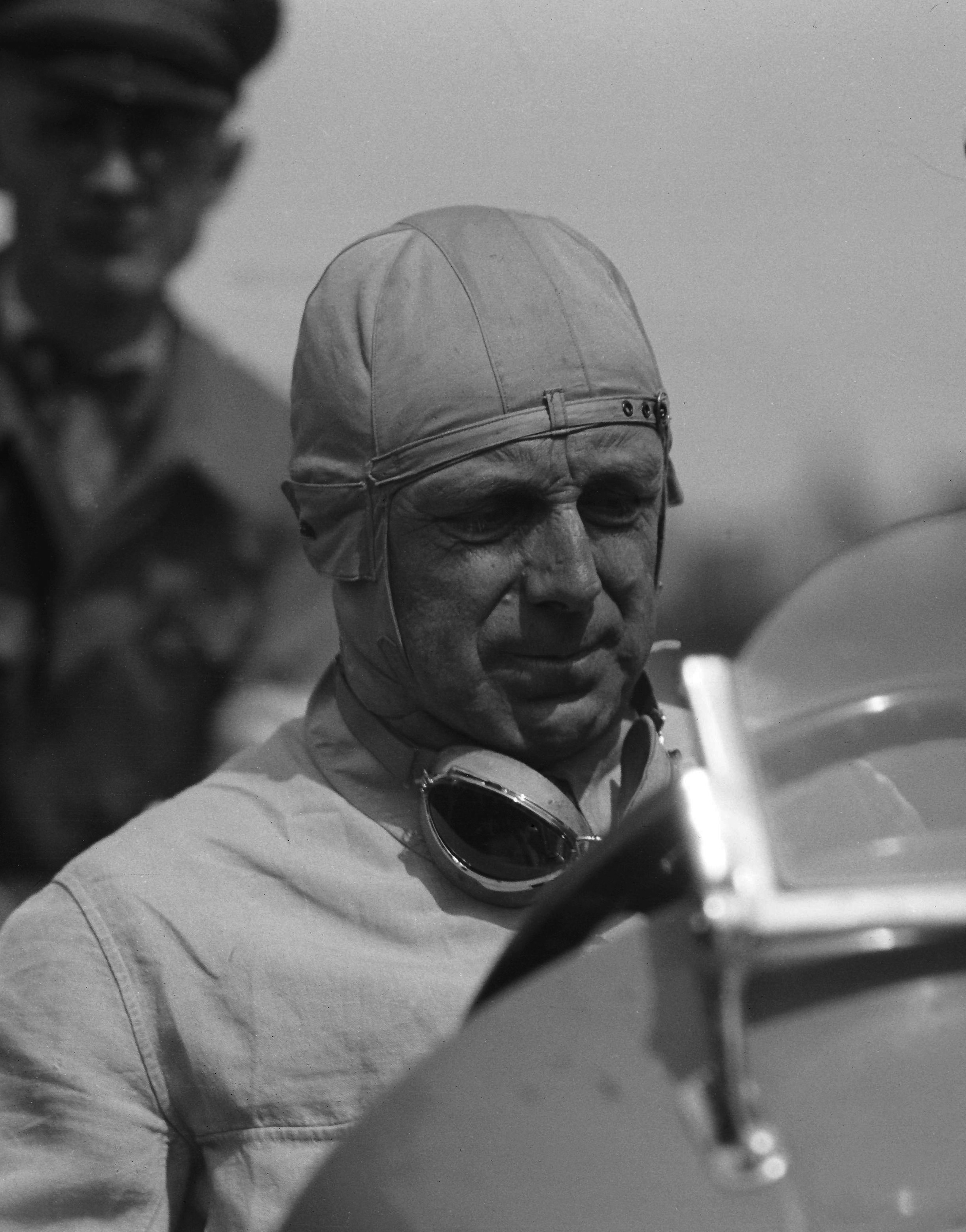

Member of the House of Lords
- Lord Temporal
- In office 11 January 1929 – 26 July 1964
- Preceded by: The 4th Earl Howe
- Succeeded by: The 6th Earl Howe

Member of Parliament for Battersea South
- In office 14 December 1918 – 10 January 1929
- Preceded by: Constituency created
- Succeeded by: William Bennett

Personal details
- Born: Francis Richard Henry Penn Curzon; 1 May 1884 Mayfair, London, England
- Died: 26 July 1964 (aged 80) Amersham, Buckinghamshire, England
- Party: Conservative
- Spouses: Mary Curzon (m. 1907; div. 1937) Joyce Mary Mclean Jack (m. 1937; div. 1943) Sybil Boyter Johnson (m. 1944)
- Children: by Mary Curzon: Edward Curzon, 6th Earl Howe; Lady Georgiana Curzon by Sybil Boyter Johnson: Lady Sarah Curzon
- Parent(s): Richard Curzon, 4th Earl Howe; Lady Georgiana Spencer-Churchill

Champ Car career
- 1 race run over 1 year
- First race: 1936 Vanderbilt Cup (Westbury)
Wins	Podiums	Poles
0	0	0

24 Hours of Le Mans career
- Years: 1929–1932, 1934–1935
- Teams: Bentley, privateer
- Best finish: 1st (1931)
- Class wins: 2 (1930, 1931)

Francis Richard Henry Penn Curzon, 5th Earl Howe (1 May 1884 – 26 July 1964), styled Viscount Curzon from 1900 to 1929, was a British naval officer, Member of Parliament, and racing driver and promoter. In the 1918 UK general election he won the Battersea South seat as the candidate of the Conservative Party, which he held until 1929. While in Parliament he took up motor racing, and later won the 1931 24 Hours of Le Mans race. He ascended to the House of Lords in 1929, succeeding his father as the 5th Earl Howe. In 1928, he co-founded the British Racing Drivers' Club with Dudley Benjafield and served as its president until his death in 1964.

== Early life ==
Curzon was born 1 May 1884 in Mayfair, London. He was the only son of Richard Curzon, 4th Earl Howe and Lady Georgiana Elizabeth Spencer-Churchill.

== Early career ==
After leaving school, Viscount Curzon, as he was then, joined the Royal Naval Reserve, following in a long family tradition. 28 October 1907, Lieutenant Viscount Curzon, RNVR, formerly of the London Division, was appointed Commanding Officer of the Sussex Division of the Royal Naval Volunteer Reserve in Hove, Sussex, with the rank of Commander RNVR. When World War I started the RNVR was formed into the Royal Naval Division and they were to fight on land like infantrymen not sailors. Commander the Rt. Hon. Viscount Curzon served as battalion commander, Howe Battalion of the 2nd Brigade RND. Howe Battalion saw action at Gallipoli, April 1915 – January 1916; Mudros and Stavros, Salonica, January–May 1916; France and Belgium, May 1916 – February 1918, when the battalion was disbanded. During part of this period Curzon also served as aide-de-camp to George V.

During the First World War, as a keen film maker, he organised the cinematograph service for the Navy. (See: The Scotsman - Wednesday 24 May 1922 p 19 col 3). He took the cinematograph film of the surrender of the German fleet at Scapa Flow from the deck of H.M.S. Queen Elizabeth (The Bioscope - Thursday 28 November 1918 P 6 col 2 "Gossip and Opinions" and https://www.gettyimages.co.uk/detail/news-photo/surrender-of-german-fleet-at-scapa-flow-in-the-orkneys-news-photo/3139960).

Following the armistice Viscount Curzon moved into politics. In the 1918 General Election, he won the Battersea South seat, standing for the Conservative Party. When the RNVR was reconstituted in 1921 Viscount Curzon resumed his position as the commanding officer of the Sussex division with the rank of captain; he was to hold this appointment until the RNVR was mobilised again in September 1939 on the outbreak of World War II. Following his father's death in 1929, Francis Curzon ascended to the title Earl Howe, making him ineligible for parliamentary re-election. He was appointed a Privy Counsellor in the 1929 Dissolution Honours. However, during his later years as an MP, Curzon had begun to become involved in motor racing. An associate of the Bentley Boys, he was instrumental in forming the ideas which led Dudley Benjafield to set up the British Racing Drivers' Club in 1928. The newly ennobled Earl Howe was elected its president at the BRDC's first Annual General Meeting in 1929.

== Motor racing career ==
Francis Curzon made his race debut at the comparatively old age of 44, in the 1928 Irish TT with a Bugatti Type 43. After leaving the House of Commons, he pursued his driving career with increasing vigour. During the 1930s, he became a well known driver, competing in many national and international races, most notably the 24 Hours of Le Mans. He entered the endurance classic six times between 1929 and 1935, only missing the 1933 event. For the first year, he was entered as a part of the Bentley factory team; but he later entered his own cars, as Bentley was taken over by Rolls-Royce in 1931 and withdrew from motor racing. Driving his own Alfa Romeo 6C with co-driver Leslie Callingham he finished fifth overall, and third in the 3-litre class at the 1930 race. He upgraded to an Alfa Romeo 8C for the 1931 24 Hours of Le Mans, and won the race outright driving in partnership with Henry Birkin.

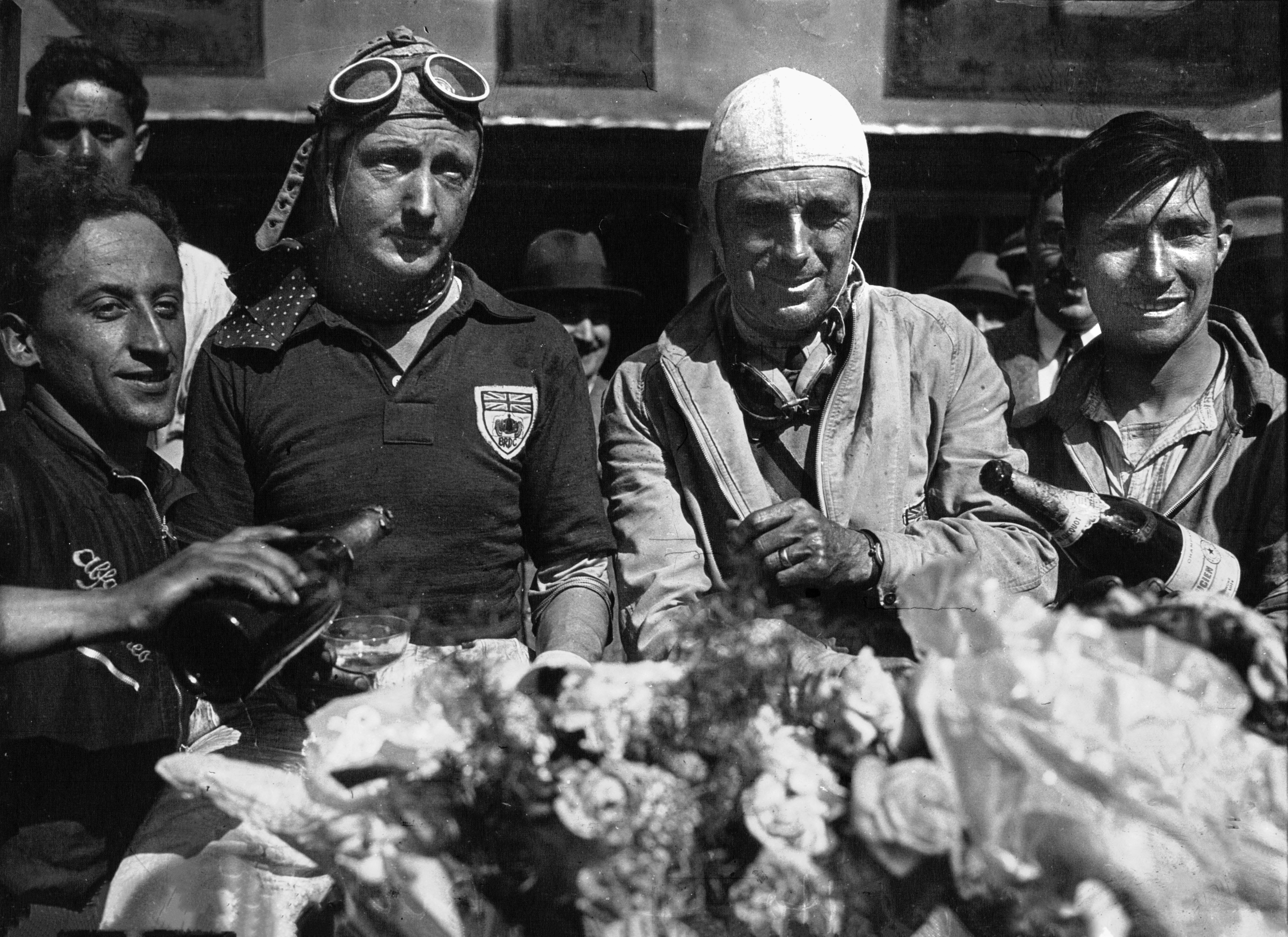
Earl Howe (right) and 'Tim' Birkin after their victory in the 1931 24 Hours of Le Mans race

Away from La Sarthe, Earl Howe (as he was most commonly entered following his father's death) drove in a variety of automobiles. Indeed, in the mid-1930s, he was credited by Time magazine as having "Europe's most elaborate" collection of racing cars. Although patriotic, he was often forced to buy and run cars built outside the UK, as once Bentley had withdrawn from motor sport there were no realistically competitive British-built machines available. He favored the Bugatti marque, owning and campaigning several Bugattis. He won the Donington Park Trophy race in 1933, and added to his victory haul with a win in the 1938 Grosvenor Grand Prix, at Cape Town in South Africa. In addition to these two victories he also took podium finishes in eleven other major races between 1933 and 1939, and became one of only two men to have competed in every running of the RAC Tourist Trophy on the Ards Circuit, the other being Edward Ramsden Hall.

In 1937, Howe was seriously injured in an accident driving his pale blue and silver – Howe's personal racing colours – English Racing Automobiles R8B, while challenging the Thai royal family competitor Prince Bira for the lead in the Campbell Trophy at the Brooklands circuit.

Aside from assuming the presidency of the BRDC, Howe also served as vice-president of the FIA's Commission Sportive Internationale, the governing body of international motorsport at the time. He also kept motorsport issues on the political landscape, with numerous speeches in the House of Lords.

== Post-war career ==
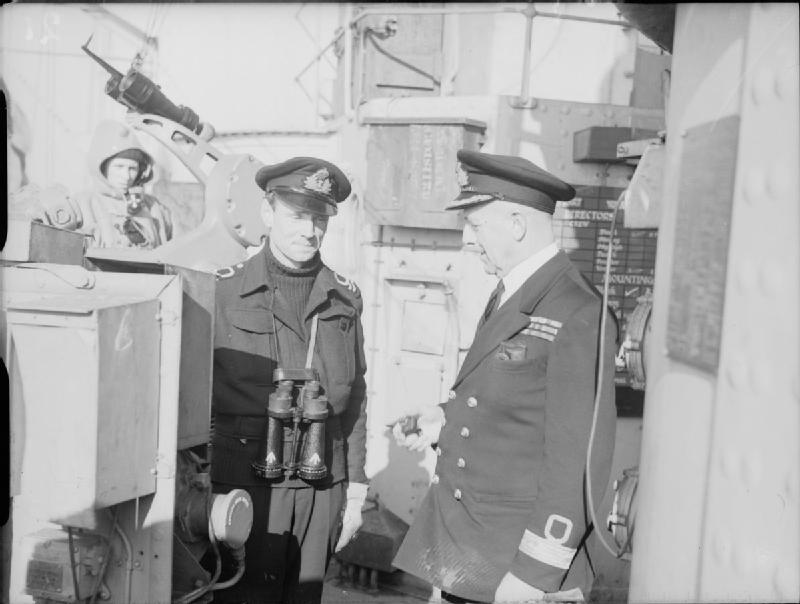
Commodore The Earl Howe (right) with his son, Lieutenant Edward Curzon, on board the battleship HMS Howe during WWII.

The start of the Second World War effectively ended Howe's front line driving career, and he returned to the Navy with the rank of commodore. At the end of the conflict, he moved into race organising, although he continued to prepare and enter cars for other drivers, including Tazio Nuvolari. As President of the BRDC and Patron of the newly formed 500 Club, he was instrumental in the resumption of motor racing and applied political pressure to allow airfields to be used for motor sport. He was involved in organising the first British Grand Prix, at Silverstone in 1948, which gained full Formula One World Championship status at the Championship's inception in 1950. He also instituted the annual BRDC International Trophy meeting at the same circuit. Under Howe's 35-year stewardship, the BRDC went from private dining club to one of the most successful and high-profile motor sport associations in the world.

== The Earl Howe Trophy ==
Today, the BRDC maintains a highly prestigious award in his memory: The Earl Howe Trophy. Until 2018, this was awarded annually "to the highest placed British Driver in the Indy 500 race or to the British driver who has established the most meritorious performance of the year in North America". The winning criteria were subjective and were determined at the discretion of the awarding panel. In 2016 the winner was Ed Jones, the Dubai-born driver who won the 2016 Indy Lights series, while no British driver finished within the top-ten of the 2016 Indianapolis 500. In 2017, the Earl Howe Trophy winner was Sam Bird, who won both races at the USA round of the Formula E world championship: the 2017 New York City ePrix. In contrast to the previous year, two British drivers had finished in the top ten at Indianapolis – Jones (third) and Max Chilton (fourth) – with Chilton also leading the most laps during the race. Previously, Justin Wilson won the 2013 award having finished in fifth place at that year's Indianapolis 500 event.

From 2019, the award has been made to "the most outstanding performance of the year in Historic racing". The inaugural winners under the new criteria were Philip Walker and Gordon Shedden who, together with co-driver Miles Griffiths, won the 2019 Spa Six Hours historic endurance race.

Winners of the Earl Howe Trophy - Historic Racing
Year	Recipient	Achievement
2025	Tom Ingram	Winner of the RAC TT Celebration race at the Goodwood Revival meeting
2024	Oliver Bryant	Peter Auto 2.0L Cup winner, and Goodwood Revival Driver of the Meeting
2023	Andy Priaulx	Winner of the Goodwood RAC TT Celebration and Spa Six Hours races
2022	Gordon Shedden	
2021	Michael Lyons	Three-fold winner at the 2021 Historic Grand Prix of Monaco
2020	Not awarded	
2019	Philip Walker; Gordon Shedden	Winners of the Spa Six Hours race

Winners of the Earl Howe Trophy - Merit in North America
Year	Recipient	Achievement
2018	(England) Richard Westbrook	Winner of the 2018 24 Hours of Daytona GTLM class, and championship runner-up and three-time class winner in the 2018 WeatherTech SportsCar Championship
2017	(England) Sam Bird	Winner of both races of the 2017 New York City ePrix
2016	(United Arab Emirates) Ed Jones	Winner of the 2016 Indy Lights series
2015	(England) Richard Westbrook	Championship runner-up and two-time race winner in the 2015 United SportsCar Championship
2014	(England) Jack Harvey	Championship runner-up and four-time race winner in the 2014 Indy Lights season
2013	(England) Justin Wilson	Fifth place in the 2013 Indianapolis 500
2012	(Scotland) Dario Franchitti	Winner of the 2012 Indianapolis 500
2011	(England) Dan Wheldon^{†}	Winner of the 2011 Indianapolis 500
2010	(Scotland) Dario Franchitti	Winner of the 2010 Indianapolis 500
2009	(Scotland) Dario Franchitti	Winner of the 2009 IndyCar Series
2008	(Scotland) David Coulthard	Third place in the 2008 Canadian Grand Prix
2007	(Scotland) Dario Franchitti	Winner of the 2007 Indianapolis 500
2006	(England) Dan Wheldon	Fourth place in the 2006 Indianapolis 500
2005	(England) Dan Wheldon	Winner of the 2005 Indianapolis 500
2004	(England) Dan Wheldon	Third place in the 2004 Indianapolis 500
2003	(England) Mark Taylor	Winner of the 2003 Infiniti Pro Series
2002	(Scotland) Dario Franchitti	Three-time race winner in the 2002 CART season
2001	(England) Dan Wheldon	Championship runner-up and two-time race winner in the 2001 Indy Lights season
2000	(England) James Weaver	Winner of the 2000 Grand American Road Racing Championship
1999	(Scotland) Dario Franchitti	Championship runner-up and three-time race winner in the 1999 CART season
1997	(England) James Weaver (England) Andy Wallace	Winners of the 1997 24 Hours of Daytona
1996	(England) Mark Blundell	Two top-five finishes in the 1996 IndyCar World Series
1993	(England) Nigel Mansell	Winner of the 1993 IndyCar World Series
1987	(Scotland) Johnny Dumfries	Race winner in the 1987 IMSA GT Championship
1984	(England) Derek Bell	Five-time race winner and third place in the 1984 IMSA GT Championship
This list is incomplete.^{†} Awarded posthumously.

== Personal life ==
On 28 October 1907, Curzon married his first cousin Mary Curzon (30 October 1887 – 1 September 1962), daughter of the Hon. Montagu Curzon and wife Esmé FitzRoy. They divorced in 1937. A daughter (by Mary Curzon), Lady Georgiana Curzon, married Home Kidston, a Royal Navy officer, farmer and racing driver.

Curzon next married Joyce Mary Mclean Jack in 1937 with whom he had one daughter, the Lady Frances Curzon. They divorced 1943, and in 1944 he married Sybil Boyter Johnson, with whom he had a third and final daughter, Lady Sarah Marguerite Curzon (25 January 1945 – 17 June 2025). She married Formula One driver Piers Courage. After Courage's death in the 1970 Dutch Grand Prix, she married John Aspinall.

The Earl Howe died on 26 July 1964. He was succeeded by his eldest son, Edward.

== Motorsports career results ==
=== European Championship results ===
(key) (Races in bold indicate pole position) (Races in italics indicate fastest lap)

Year	Entrant	Chassis	Engine	1	2	3	4	5	6	7	EDC	Pts
1931	Earl Howe	Bugatti T51	Bugatti 2.3 L8	ITA	FRA; 12	BEL					17th	20
1932	Earl Howe	Bugatti T54	Bugatti 5.0 L8	ITA	FRA; 9	GER					9th	20
1935	Earl Howe	Bugatti T59	Bugatti 3.3 L8	MON; Ret	FRA	BEL	GER	SUI; 10	ITA	ESP	19th	50
1936	Earl Howe	Bugatti T59	Bugatti 3.3 L8	MON	GER	SUI; Ret	ITA				26th	30

=== 24 Hours of Le Mans results ===
Year	Team	Co-drivers	Car	Class	Laps	Pos.	Class pos.
1929	(United Kingdom) Bentley Motors Ltd.	(Australia) Bernard Rubin	Bentley 4½ Litre	5.0	7	DNF (Electrics)	
1930	(United Kingdom) Lord Howe	(United Kingdom) Leslie Callingham	Alfa Romeo 6C 1750GS	2.0	159	5th	**1st**
1931	(United Kingdom) Lord Howe	(United Kingdom) Henry Birkin	Alfa Romeo 8C 2300LM	3.0	184	**1st**	**1st**
1932	(United Kingdom) Lord Howe	(United Kingdom) Henry Birkin	Alfa Romeo 8C 2300LM	3.0	110	DNF (Engine)	
1934	(United Kingdom) Lord Howe	(United Kingdom) Tim Rose-Richards	Alfa Romeo 8C 2300LM	3.0	85	DNF	
1935	(United Kingdom) Earl Howe	(United Kingdom) Brian Lewis	Alfa Romeo 8C 2300	3.0	129	DNF	

== Awards and honours ==
- Commander of the Order of the British Empire (CBE), 1924 Birthday Honours
- British War Medal
- Victory Medal
- 1939–1945 Star
- Defense Medal
- War Medal 1939–1945
- King George V Coronation Medal
- King George V Silver Jubilee Medal
- King George VI Coronation Medal
- Queen Elizabeth II Coronation Medal
- Reserve Decoration

== See also ==
- Bugatti Type 57S Atalante number 57502

Political offices
New constituency	Member of Parliament for Battersea South; 1918–1929	Succeeded by William Bennett
Sporting positions
Preceded by Dudley Benjafield	BRDC President; 1929–1964	Succeeded by Gerald Lascelles
Preceded by Woolf Barnato; Glen Kidston	Winner of the 24 Hours of Le Mans; 1931 with Tim Birkin	Succeeded by Raymond Sommer; Luigi Chinetti
Peerage of the United Kingdom
Preceded by Richard Curzon	Earl Howe; 2nd creation 1929–1964; Member of the House of Lords (1929–1964)	Succeeded by Edward Curzon
Preceded by Richard Curzon	Viscount Curzon; 1929–1964	Succeeded by Edward Curzon
Peerage of Great Britain
Preceded by Richard Curzon	Baron Curzon; 1929–1964	Succeeded by Edward Curzon
Preceded by Richard Curzon	Baron Howe; 1929–1964	Succeeded by Edward Curzon
