= Montagu Curzon =

British soldier and politician

The Honourable Montagu Curzon

Member of Parliament for Leicestershire North
- In office 1883–1885 Serving with Lord John Manners
- Preceded by: Lord John Manners; Edwyn Burnaby
- Succeeded by: Constituency abolished

Personal details
- Born: Montagu Curzon-Howe; 21 September 1846 London, England
- Died: 1 September 1907 (aged 60) Loughborough, England
- Party: Conservative
- Spouse: Esmé FitzRoy (m. 1886)
- Children: Mary Curzon, Lady Howe; William Montagu Curzon-Herrick
- Parent(s): Richard Curzon-Howe, 1st Earl Howe; Anne Gore
- Relatives: Sir John Gore (grandfather); George Curzon-Howe, 2nd Earl Howe (brother); Richard Curzon-Howe, 3rd Earl Howe (brother); Sir Leicester Smyth (brother); Sir Assheton Curzon-Howe (brother)

The Hon. Montagu Curzon (21 September 1846 – 1 September 1907) was a British soldier and Conservative politician.

== Early life ==
Curzon was the eldest son of Richard Curzon-Howe, 1st Earl Howe, by his second wife Anne, daughter of Vice-Admiral Sir John Gore. George Curzon-Howe, 2nd Earl Howe, Richard Curzon-Howe, 3rd Earl Howe and the Hon. Sir Leicester Smyth were his elder half-brothers and the Hon. Sir Assheton Curzon-Howe his younger brother. Admiral Richard Howe, 1st Earl Howe was his great-grandfather.

== Career ==
Curzon was a Colonel in the Rifle Brigade. He was returned to Parliament for Leicestershire North in an 1883 by-election (caused by the death of Edwyn Sherard Burnaby), a seat he held until the constituency was abolished two years later.

== Personal life ==
Curzon married in London on 19 October 1886 Esmé FitzRoy (1859–1939), the fourth daughter of Francis Horatio FitzRoy (son of Admiral Lord William FitzRoy) and his wife, the Hon. Gertrude Duncombe (second daughter of William Duncombe, 2nd Baron Feversham). They had one son and one daughter:

- Mary Curzon (1887–1962), who married her first cousin, Francis Curzon, 5th Earl Howe on 28 October 1907. They divorced in 1937.
- William Montagu Curzon-Herrick, who married Lady Maud Kathleen Cairnes Plantagenet Hastings, daughter of Warner Hastings, 15th Earl of Huntingdon.

Curzon died in Loughborough on 1 September 1907. His widow remarried to the Rev. William Arthur King, Vicar of Woodhouse, in London on 26 October 1909. She later died in Woodhouse on 25 May 1939.

Parliament of the United Kingdom
Preceded by Lord John Manners; Edwyn Burnaby	Member of Parliament for Leicestershire North; 1883–1885; With: Lord John Manners	Constituency abolished
