= Curzon =

Curzon may refer to:

== People ==
- Curzon (surname)
- Alfred de Curzon (1820–1895), French painter
- Walter de Curzon Poultney (1845–1929), one of Baltimore, Maryland's most colorful and flamboyant high-society members
- William Hutt Curzon Wyllie (1848-1909), British Indian army officer, and later an official of the British Indian Government.
- Baron Curzon

== Places ==
- Birmingham Curzon Street railway station, the planned High Speed 2 terminus station in the city centre of Birmingham, England
- Birmingham Curzon Street railway station (1838–1966), a railway station in central Birmingham, England
- Curzon Community Cinema, Clevedon, one of the oldest continually running purpose-built cinemas in the world
- Curzon Hall, a British Raj–era building and home of the Faculty of Sciences at the University of Dhaka
- Curzon Street, located within the exclusive Mayfair district of London
- Curzon Village, a constituent area of the Canadian town of Woody Point, Newfoundland and Labrador
- Curzon, Missouri, an extinct hamlet in Missouri
- Curzon, Vendée, a commune in the Vendée department in the Pays de la Loire region in western France

== Ships ==
- HMS Curzon (K513), a Captain-class frigate of the British Royal Navy
- HMS Fittleton (originally HMS Curzon), a wooden-hulled Ton-class minesweeper of the Royal Navy

== Other ==
- Curzon: Imperial Statesman, a 1994 book by David Gilmour
- Curzon, a famous cologne sold by Geo. F. Trumper
- Curzon Film, a British film distributor
- Curzon Ashton F.C., an association football club based in Ashton-under-Lyne, Greater Manchester, England
- Curzon Cinemas, a chain of cinemas based in the United Kingdom
- Curzon Dax, a character from the TV series Star Trek: Deep Space Nine
- Curzon Line, a historical demarcation line of World War II
