= Prince Eugen of Schaumburg-Lippe =

Member of the House of Lippe

Eugen of Schaumburg-Lippe
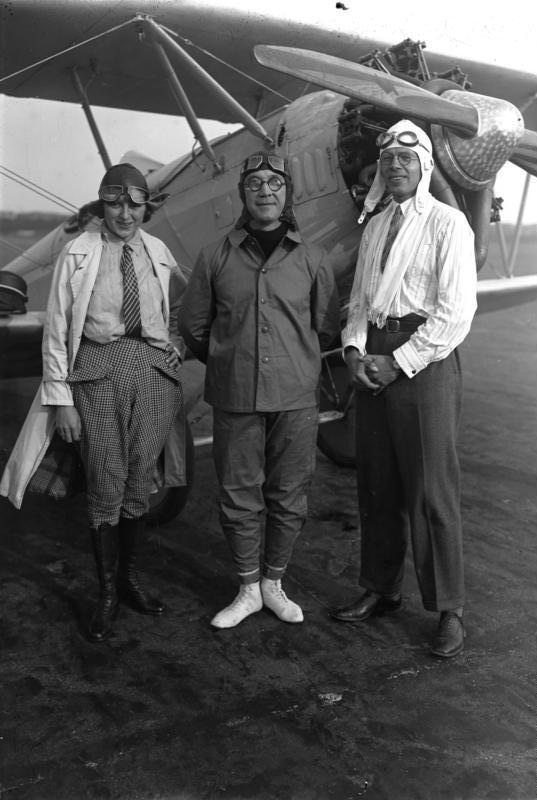
- Prince Eugen of Schaumburg-Lippe (right)
- Born: 8 August 1899; Hannover, Germany
- Died: 6 November 1929 (aged 30); Caterham, Surrey
Names
- German: Wilhelm Eugen Georg Friedrich August Albrecht
- House: House of Lippe
- Father: Prince Maximilian of Schaumburg-Lippe
- Mother: Princess Olga of Württemberg

Prince Eugen of Schaumburg-Lippe full German name: Wilhelm Eugen Georg Friedrich August Albrecht zu Schaumburg-Lippe (8 August 1899, in Hannover, Germany – 7 November 1929, in Caterham, Surrey) was a son of Prince Maximilian August Jaroslav Adalbert Hermann of Schaumburg-Lippe (1871–1904) and Princess Olga Alexandra Marie of Württemberg (1876–1932). Prince Eugen was second pilot (German: Zweiter Führer) on a Luft Hansa (forerunner to the legally separate Lufthansa) air liner flying from Croydon to Amsterdam

== Family ==
His father, Prince Maximilian of Schaumburg-Lippe, son of Prince William of Schaumburg-Lippe and Princess Bathildis of Anhalt-Dessau, married Princess Olga of Württemberg on 3 November 1898 at Stuttgart, Baden-Württemberg. Prince Eugen was born 8 August 1899. He had two brothers: Prince Albrecht of Schaumburg-Lippe and Prince Bernhard of Schaumburg-Lippe. Prince Albrecht married on 2 September 1930 Baroness Walburga von Hirschberg. They had no children. He had a daughter with Baroness Marie-Gabriele von Pfetten-Arnbach. Prince Bernhard died in childhood.

== Death ==
On 6 November 1929 he was flying in a Luft Hansa Junkers G 31 which was carrying four crew and four passengers. The plane crashed in Foster Down near Caterham probably due to dense fog and low clouds and the pilot misjudging the height of trees. Three of the crew and three of the passengers were burnt to death at the scene.

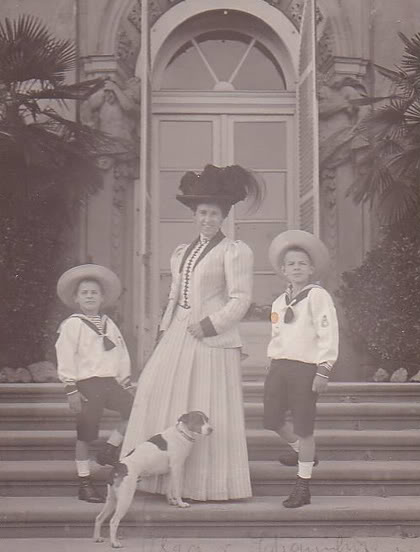
Olga of Württemberg with her sons: Prince Albrecht of Schaumburg-Lippe (right) and Prince Eugen of Schaumburg-Lippe (left).

Prince Eugen of Schaumburg-Lippe also escaped from the wreckage, but he was seriously injured. Kidston raised the alarm and reported the accident to Croydon Airport. He was treated at Caterham Cottage Hospital. The fire was eventually extinguished by firemen from Caterham. Personnel from RAF Kenley assisted the local police in collecting the remains of the deceased and transporting them to a mortuary in Caterham. Schaumburg-Lippe died the day after the accident from injuries sustained in the crash.

This was the prince's first air accident, "although he had risked his life scores of times." He is a stunt flyer "by inclination," and only two-weeks ago he "performed hair-raising stunts" over Berlin's Tempelhof Air Field, where he swung from a trapeze hanging from a flying airplane. He was working on his qualifications for the Berlin-Croydon-Amsterdam service for a full pilot's license.

== Bibliography ==
- Daniel Willis. The Romanovs in the 21st Century: a genealogical Biography, VDM Verlag Dr. Müller 2009. ISBN 978-3-639-17480-9
- Six are killed in plane crash: The Pittsburgh Press. Wednesday, 6 November 1929
- The Air Liner Disaster: The Times (London). Saturday, 9 November 1929
- Centenary of Western Australia, German Air Liner Disaster: The Times (London). Thursday, 7 November 1929
