= John Curzon (cricketer) =

English cricketer (born 1954)

John Timothy Curzon (born 4 June 1954 in Lenton, Nottingham) is an English former first-class cricketer active 1978 who played for Nottinghamshire.
