= 1710s =

Decade

The 1710s decade ran from January 1, 1710, to December 31, 1719.

== Events ==
=== 1710 ===
==== January–March ====
- January 1 – In Prussia, Cölln is merged with Alt-Berlin by Frederick I to form Berlin.
- January 4 – Robert Balfour, 5th Lord Balfour of Burleigh, two days before he is due to be executed for murder, escapes from the Edinburgh Tolbooth by exchanging clothes with his sister.
- February 17 – Mauritius, a Dutch colony since 1638, is abandoned by the Dutch.
- February 28 (Swedish calendar) February 27 (Julian). March 10 (Gregorian) – Battle of Helsingborg: Fourteen thousand Danish invaders, under Jørgen Rantzau, are decisively defeated by an equally large Swedish army, under Magnus Stenbock.
- March 1 – The Sacheverell riots start in London with an attack on an elegant Presbyterian meeting-house in Lincoln's Inn Fields, followed by riots through the West End of London.
- March 6 – The ancient Roman Pillar of the Boatmen is found during the construction of a crypt under the nave of Notre-Dame de Paris.

==== April–June ====
- April 5 – Pylyp Orlyk, a Cossack of Ukraine, is elected as the Hetman of the Zaporizhian Host and immediately issues the Pacts and Constitutions of Rights and Freedoms of the Zaporizhian Host.
- April 10 – The world's first copyright legislation, Britain's Statute of Anne, becomes effective.
- April 19 – Anne, Queen of Great Britain, meets the Four Mohawk Kings.
- April 18 – Thomas Hancorne gives the county of Swansea's assize sermon, "The right way to honour and happiness" in which he espouses his High Church beliefs.
- May 6 – The South Sea Company begins.
- May 12 – Battle of Sirhind: An army of 70,000 Sikh rebels, led by Banda Singh Bahadur defeat a force of 25,000 Mughal Empire troops commanded by General Wazir Khan, who is killed in the combat. The battle takes place near Sirhind in what is now the Indian state of Punjab.
- June 8 – The Tuscarora nation sends a petition to the Province of Pennsylvania, protesting the seizure of their lands and enslavement of their people, by citizens of the Province of Carolina.
- June 16 – Köprülüzade Numan Pasha becomes the grand vizier of the Ottoman Empire.
- June 24 – In the Isle of Man, Manx coins become legal tender.
- June – Protestant Swiss and German Palatines, under the leadership of Christoph von Graffenried, travel to Bath County in the Province of Carolina. The settlers displace the native town of Chattoka and found New Bern, named for von Graffenried's hometown of Bern in Switzerland.

==== July–September ====
- July 27 – The Battle of Almenar takes place in the Iberian theatre of the War of the Spanish Succession.
- August 2 – British Royal Navy 90-gun ship HMS Vanguard is relaunched from Chatham; Vanguard sank in Chatham Dockyard in the Great Storm of 1703, but was raised in 1704 for rebuilding.
- August 20 – War of the Spanish Succession – Battle of Saragossa: The Spanish-Bourbon army, commanded by the Marquis de Bay, is soundly defeated by the forces of the Habsburg monarchy, under Guido Starhemberg and their allies.
- August 24 – Total eclipse of the sun is visible at 36.5°S 105.1°W.
- September 7 – In Jonathan Swift's satirical Gulliver's Travels, fictional Gulliver sets off on his fourth and final journey, a voyage to the Land of the Houyhnhnms.
- September 26 – Great Northern War – Capitulation of Livonia: the Swedish garrison in Riga surrenders, ending Swedish rule in modern Latvia.

==== October–December ====
- October – The start of the Mascate War (aka the War of the Peddlers) between two rival mercantile groups the Zillioto family and the Astrid family in colonial Brazil.
- October 4 – Great Northern War – the Battle of Køge Bay between Denmark and Norway has an indecisive outcome.
- October 5 – October 13 British forces under Francis Nicholson conduct the successful Siege of Port Royal against a French Acadian garrison and the Wabanaki Confederacy at the Acadian capital, Port Royal, marking the start of British control of what became Nova Scotia.
- October 10 – Great Northern War – Capitulation of Estonia: the Swedish garrison in Reval (Tallinn) surrenders, ending Swedish rule in Estonia.
- October 11 – The Battle of Rahon is fought between Sikhs and Mughal Empire.
- October 13 – Queen Anne's War – Siege of Port Royal: The French surrender, giving the British permanent possession of Nova Scotia.
- November 30 – The first visit to the Pacific islands of Palau is made by a Jesuit expedition led by Francisco Padilla; unfortunately, the ship is driven to Mindanao by a storm, leaving two priests stranded.
- December 8 – War of the Spanish Succession – Battle of Brihuega: An outnumbered British force under James Stanhope is forced to surrender.
- December 10
  - War of the Spanish Succession – Battle of Villaviciosa: The indecisive battle between retreating Austrian-Dutch forces and a Franco-Spanish army is fought out.
  - The Battle of Lohgarh takes place between Sikh forces and the Mughal army.

==== Date unknown ====
- In Sweden, the Royal Society of Sciences in Uppsala is founded as the Collegium curiosorum.
- Explorer Juan Arias Diaz becomes the first non-Incan visitor to Choquequirao, an Inca site in Peru.
- John Smithwick begins brewing Smithwick's ale at Kilkenny, Ireland (St. Francis Abbey Brewery).
- Alexis Littré, in his treatise Diverses observations anatomiques, is the first physician to suggest the possibility of performing a lumbar colostomy for an obstruction of the colon.
- Jacob Christoph Le Blon, working in Amsterdam, invents a three-color printing process with red, blue, and yellow plates, a precursor of the modern CMYK printing process.

=== 1711 ===
==== January–March ====
- January – Cary's Rebellion: The Lords Proprietor appoint Edward Hyde to replace Thomas Cary, as the governor of the North Carolina portion of the Province of Carolina. Hyde's policies are deemed hostile to Quaker interests, leading former governor Cary and his Quaker allies to take up arms against the province.
- January 24 – The first performance of Francesco Gasparini's most famous opera Tamerlano takes place at the Teatro San Cassiano in Venice.
- February – French settlers at Fort Louis de la Mobile celebrate Mardi Gras in Mobile (Alabama), by parading a large papier-mache ox head on a cart (the first Mardi Gras parade in America).
- February 3 – A total lunar eclipse occurs, at 12:31 UT.
- February 24
  - Thomas Cary, after declaring himself Governor of North Carolina, sails an armed brigantine up the Chowan River, to attack Governor Hyde's forces fortified at Colonel Thomas Pollock's plantation. The attack fails, and Cary's forces retreat.
  - Rinaldo by George Frideric Handel, the first Italian opera written for the London stage, premieres at the Queen's Theatre, Haymarket.
- March 1 – The Spectator is founded by Joseph Addison and Richard Steele in London.

==== April–June ====
- April 3 – Clipperton Island is rediscovered by Frenchmen Martin de Chassiron and Michel Du Bocage, who draws up the first map and claims the island for France. The island had been discovered by Alvaro Saavedra Cedrón in 1528.
- April 5 (Easter Sunday) – The central tower of Elgin Cathedral in northeast Scotland collapses.
- April 13 – The Treaty of the Lutsk, a secret agreement between the Tsardom of Russia and the Ottoman Protectorate of Moldavia is signed in Lutsk, Poland-Lithuania (modern-day Ukraine).
- April 17 – Joseph I, Holy Roman Emperor dies, opening the way for the succession of his brother Charles VI. This complicates the ongoing War of the Spanish Succession as Charles is one of the two candidates for the Spanish throne, backed by the Grand Alliance.
- April 29 – A rabid wolf fatally injures two shepherds in Roncà, North Italy; it also attacks livestock.
- May – Alexander Pope publishes the poem An Essay on Criticism in London.
- May 25 – In Denmark, Helsingør is put under military blockade to prevent an outbreak of plague from spreading to Copenhagen; this year about one third of Helsingør's population is killed by the disease.
- June 18 – King Louis XIV becomes the longest-reigning monarch in the world, surpassing the previous record of 68 years set by Kʼinich Janaabʼ Pakal in 683. As of 2022, Louis XIV still holds this record.

==== July–September ====
- July 2 – Cary's Rebellion: Lieutenant Governor Alexander Spotswood of Virginia dispatches a company of Royal Marines to assist Governor Hyde. After hearing of this, Cary's troops abandon all of their fortifications along the Pamlico River. Cary and many of his supporters are soon caught and sent to England as prisoners, ending Cary's Rebellion.
- July 11 – The town of São Paulo, Brazil, is elevated to city status.
- July 21 – The Treaty of the Pruth is signed between the Ottoman Empire and Russia, ending the Pruth River Campaign.
- July 29 – Total lunar eclipse at 17:50 UT.
- August 1 – The Dutch East India Company trading ship Zuytdorp leaves the Netherlands on an ill-fated voyage to Indonesia bearing a load of freshly minted silver coins. The wreck site remains unknown until the mid-20th century, on a remote part of the Western Australian coast between Kalbarri and Shark Bay.
- August 7 – Capture of the galleon San Joaquin: Spanish galleon San Joaquin in a treasure fleet sailing from Cartagena de Indias (modern-day Colombia) to Spain surrenders after an engagement with five British ships.
- August 9 – John Churchill, 1st Duke of Marlborough with an army of 30,000 besieges Bouchain in the War of the Spanish Succession. The siege lasts 34 days and results in the last major victory for Churchill.
- August 11 – The first horse race is held at the newly founded Ascot Racecourse, which becomes one of the leading racecourses in England.
- August 13 – Tamachi Raisinhji becomes Jam Sahib (ruling prince) of Nawanagar State in Gujarat, India.
- August 14 – The inauguration of the newly built Cathedral of the Assumption takes place in Gozo, Malta.
- August 22 – The Quebec Expedition, a British attempt to attack Quebec as part of Queen Anne's War, fails when 8 of its ships are wrecked in the Saint Lawrence River and 890 people, mostly soldiers, drown.
- September 8 – The South Sea Company receives a Royal Charter in Britain.
- September 10 (also dated September 12) – John Lawson, Christoph von Graffenried, two African American slaves and two Native Americans leave on an exploration expedition from New Bern, North Carolina, and travel north by canoe up the Neuse River.
- September 14 (approximate date) – Tuscarora natives capture John Lawson, Christoph von Graffenried and their expeditionary party, and bring them to Catechna.
- September 16 (approximate date) – Tuscarora natives kill Lawson. Von Graffenried and one African American slave are known to have been set free.
- September 18 – Bishop Bogusław Gosiewski sells the town of Maladzyechna in the Minsk Region of Belarus to the mighty Ogiński family.
- September 22 – The Tuscarora War begins when Tuscarora natives under the command of Chief Hancock raid settlements along the south bank of the Pamlico River, within the Province of Carolina (modern-day North Carolina), killing around 130 people.

==== October–December ====
- October 7 – HMS Feversham is wrecked on Scaterie Island, Nova Scotia with the loss of 102 lives.
- October 11 – Panic kills 241 people in the stampede on the Guillottière bridge in France near Lyon. Revelers returning from a festival on the other side of the Rhône river are blocked by from crossing after a collision between a carriage and a cart. At least 25 fall off the bridge and into the river, while 216 are trampled by people behind them.
- October 14
  - Yostos kills Tewoflos, becoming Emperor of Ethiopia.
  - Woodes Rogers returns to England after a successful round-the-world privateering cruise against Spain, carrying loot worth £150,000.
- October 16 – Académie Royale des Beaux-Arts is established in Brussels.
- November 5 – The southwest spire of Southwell Minster in Nottinghamshire, England is struck by lightning, resulting in a fire that spreads to the nave and tower, destroying roofs, bells, clock and organ.
- November 7 – The Dutch East India Company ship Liefde runs aground and sinks off Out Skerries, Shetland, with the loss of all but one of her 300 crew.
- December 5 – Great Northern War: the Battle of Wismar results in a Danish victory over Swedish forces.
- December 7 – In the Parliament of Great Britain the Earl of Nottingham successfully proposes a "No Peace Without Spain" amendment.
- December 8 – The Immaculate Conception Cathedral, Comayagua in Honduras, one of the oldest cathedrals in Central America, is inaugurated.
- December 12 – A constitution is approved for the Academy of Sciences of the Institute of Bologna, which had been founded in 1690.
- December 13 – Wall Street in New York City becomes the city's first official slave market for the sale and rental of enslaved Africans and Indians.
- December 15 – The Old Pummerin, a massive bell cast from 208 captured cannons, is consecrated by Bishop Franz Ferdinand Freiherr von Rummel in preparation for its installation in St. Stephen's Cathedral, Vienna (the Stephansdom).
- December 25 – The rebuilding of St Paul's Cathedral in London to a design by Sir Christopher Wren is declared complete by Parliament; Old St Paul's had been destroyed by the 1666 Great Fire of London.

==== Date unknown ====
- John Shore invents the tuning fork.
- Luigi Ferdinando Marsili shows that coral is an animal rather than a plant as previously thought.

=== 1712 ===
==== January–March ====
- January 8 – Total eclipse of the sun visible from 60.6°S 49.2°E
- January 12 – The premiere of the opera Idoménée by André Campra takes place at the Théâtre du Palais-Royal in Paris.
- January 16 – A military engineering school is established in Moscow which is to become the A.F. Mozhaysky Military-Space Academy.
- January 26 – The Old Pummerin, a 18,161 kg bell newly installed in the Stephansdom, St. Stephen's Cathedral, in Vienna, is rung for the first time to mark the entry of Charles VI to Vienna from Frankfurt after his coronation as Emperor. It takes a quarter-hour for 16 men pulling on the bell rope to swing the heavy bell back-and-forth enough for the clapper to strike; the resulting forces endanger the tower so the architect orders that in future the bell be rung only by pulling its clapper.
- February 10 – Huilliche uprising of 1712: Huilliche people in Chile's Chiloé Archipelago rise up against Spanish encomenderos as vengeance for perceived injustices.
- Early March – Start of the Cassard expedition, a sea voyage by French Navy captain Jacques Cassard during which he ransacks Santiago in the Cape Verde Islands and pillages Montserrat, Antigua, Surinam, Berbice, Essequibo, St. Eustatius and Curaçao, returning to France with loot worth over nine million francs.
- March 3 – Scottish Episcopalians Act 1711 comes into effect, leading to incorporation of the Scottish Episcopal Church.
- March 11 (February 30 Swedish Style, February 29 on the Julian calendar) – Sweden temporarily adopts the rare February 30, as a day to adjust the Swedish Calendar back to the Julian calendar.
- March 15 – HMS Dragon, a 38-gun fourth rate frigate of the British Royal Navy, is wrecked on Les Casquets rocks to the west of Alderney.
- March 30 – Anne, Queen of Great Britain administers the Royal touch (a ritual with the intent to cure illness) for the last time; 300 scrofulous people are touched, the last of whom is Samuel Johnson.

==== April –June ====
- April 6–7 – New York Slave Revolt of 1712: An insurrection in New York City results in nine whites being killed, and 21 slaves and other blacks being convicted and executed.
- April 11 – Great Northern War: the Battle of Fladstrand takes place at sea near Fladstrand, Jylland, between Swedish and Danish forces.
- May 15 – Curuguaty in Paraguay is founded by Juan Gregorio de Bazán y Pedraza on the banks of the Curuguaty River.
- May 19 – Peter the Great moves the capital of Russia from Moscow to Saint Petersburg.
- May 22 – Charles VI, Holy Roman Emperor is crowned King of Hungary.
- June 5 – Reus in Catalonia, Spain is given the title of imperial city by Elisabeth Christine, wife of Archduke Charles.
- June 10 – Kurtkulağı Caravanserai in Adana Province, Turkey, is restored and 50 soldiers are appointed to guard it.
- June 11 – Chatham, Barnstable County, Massachusetts is incorporated as a town.
- June 17 – The newly built St Ann's Church, Manchester, England, is consecrated by the Bishop of Chester.

==== July–September ====
- July 8 – The British Royal Navy 50-gun ship HMS Advice is launched at Deptford Dockyard.
- July 20 – Jesus College, Oxford, England, inherits the extensive library of its Principal Jonathan Edwards on his death.
- July 24
  - Battle of Denain: The French defeat a combined Dutch-Austrian force.
  - Battle of Villmergen: The Reformed cantons of Switzerland defeat the Catholic cantons.
- August 1 – The Stamp Act 1712 is passed in the United Kingdom, imposing a tax on publishers, particularly of newspapers.
- August 11 – The Peace of Aarau is signed by Catholics and Protestants, ending the Toggenburg War and establishing Protestant dominance in Switzerland, while preserving the rights of Catholics.
- August 23 – The British Royal Navy 60-gun ship HMS Rippon is launched at Deptford Dockyard.
- September – Composer George Frideric Handel re-locates to London with the permission of his patron, the future King George I of Great Britain.
- September 8 – A severe hurricane buffets Bermuda for eight hours, destroying most of the churches.

==== October–December ====
- October 3 – In Scotland a warrant is issued for the arrest of outlaw Rob Roy MacGregor by Sir James Stewart (Lord Advocate).
- October 31 – King Philip V of Spain establishes the Biblioteca Nacional de España as the Palace Public Library (Biblioteca Pública de Palacio) in Madrid.
- November 4 – The Bandbox Plot aims to kill British Lord Treasurer Robert Harley, Earl of Oxford but is foiled by Jonathan Swift (author of Gulliver’s Travels).
- November 22 – The first performance of George Frideric Handel's opera Il pastor fido takes place at the Queen's Theatre in the Haymarket, London.
- December 7 – The charter of Buchach Monastery in Ukraine, founded by Stefan Aleksander Potocki and his wife Joanna née Sieniawska, is signed in Lublin.
- December 20 – Great Northern War: the Battle of Gadebusch is Sweden's final great victory in the war, preventing the loss of the city of Stralsund to Danish and Saxon forces.
- December 27 – The premiere of the opera Callirhoé by André Cardinal Destouches takes place at the Théâtre du Palais-Royal in Paris.
- December 28 – Total eclipse of the sun visible from 21.5°S 159.0°E

==== Date unknown ====
- The first known working Newcomen steam engine is built by Thomas Newcomen with John Calley, to pump water out of mines in the Black Country of England, the first device to make practical use of the power of steam to produce mechanical work.
- After many years of settlement, the Town on Queen Anne's Creek is established as a courthouse for Chowan County, North Carolina. The town is renamed Edenton in 1720, and incorporated in 1722.
- The VOC Zuytdorp is wrecked off the coast of Western Australia.
- John Arbuthnot creates the character of John Bull to represent Britain.
- A translation of the 1662 Book of Common Prayer into Irish, made by John Richardson (1664–1747), is published.

=== 1713 ===
==== January–March ====
- January 17 – Tuscarora War: Colonel James Moore leads the Carolina militia out of Albemarle County, North Carolina, in a second offensive against the Tuscarora. Heavy snows force the troops to take refuge in Fort Reading, on the Pamlico River.
- February 1 – Skirmish at Bender, Moldova: Charles XII of Sweden is defeated by the Ottoman Empire.
- February 4 – Tuscarora War: The Carolina militia under Colonel James Moore leaves Fort Reading, to continue the campaign against the Tuscarora.
- February 25 – Frederick William I of Prussia begins his reign.
- March 1 – Tuscarora War: Colonel James Moore's Carolina militia lays siege to the Tuscaroran stronghold of Fort Neoheroka, located a few miles up Contentnea Creek from Fort Hancock.
- March 20 – Tuscarora War: Colonel James Moore's Carolina militia launches a major offensive against Fort Neoheroka.
- March 23 – Tuscarora War: Fort Neoheroka falls to the Carolina militia, effectively ending the Tuscarora nation's military strength. Two Tuscaroran allies, the Machapunga and Coree tribes, continue offensive actions against North Carolina.
- March 27 – First Treaty of Utrecht between Great Britain and Spain: Philip V is accepted by Britain and Austria as king of Spain; Spain cedes Gibraltar and Menorca to Britain.

==== April–June ====
- April 11 – The Second Treaty of Utrecht between Great Britain and France ends the War of the Spanish Succession. France cedes Newfoundland, Acadia, Hudson Bay and St Kitts to Great Britain.
- April 14 – First performance, in London, of Joseph Addison's libertarian play Cato, a Tragedy, which will be influential on both sides of the Atlantic.
- April 19 – With no living male heirs, Charles VI, Holy Roman Emperor, issues the Pragmatic Sanction of 1713, to ensure one of his daughters will inherit the Habsburg lands.
- May 1 – As part of the Treaty of Utrecht, the Spanish Crown agrees the Asiento de Negros with Anne, Queen of Great Britain, granting a subsidiary of the British South Sea Company, the Real Asiento de Inglaterra, a 30-year monopoly in the supply of African slaves to colonial Spanish America.
- May 2 – In the Great Northern War, a fleet of the Russian Navy, transporting 12,000 soldiers, sails from Kronstadt to attack the Swedish Army at Helsinki.
- May 6 – The Parliament of Ireland is dissolved by Queen Anne and new elections are set.
- May 13 – King Philip V of Spain issues an auto accordado that changes the order of succession for the Spanish throne allowing a female descendant within the House of Bourbon to rule. The change will allow his great-great-granddaughter to ascend the throne in 1833 as Queen Isabella II.
- May 17 – Ottone in villa, the first opera by composer Antonio Vivaldi, is given its initial performance, debuting at the Teatro delle Grazie in Vicenza
- May 21 – Great Northern War: The Russian fleet lands a force of 10,000 men at Pernå on the southern coast of Finland.
- June 1 (approx.) – Tuscarora War: Colonel James Moore leads the Carolina militia into the Pamlico Peninsula to defeat the Machapunga and Coree tribes.
- June 23 – French residents of Acadia are given one year to declare allegiance to Great Britain, or leave Nova Scotia.

==== July–September ====
- July 9 – The Junta de Braços (parliament) of the Principality of Catalonia votes in favour of staying in the War of the Spanish Succession against Philip V of Spain. Army of Catalonia raised.
- July 13 – The Treaty of Portsmouth brings an end to Queen Anne's War.
- August 8 – The Parliament of Great Britain, third since the Act of Union, is dissolved
- August 22 – Voting begins in the 1713 British general election in various constituencies and continues to November 12
- September 1 – Tuscarora War: The Carolina militia, led by Colonel James Moore, returns to South Carolina, after mixed success in the campaign against the Machapunga and Coree tribes.

==== October–December ====
- October 6 – The Treaty of Schwedt is signed between Russia and Brandenburg-Prussia, with the latter accepting the annexation of Baltic territories and paying Russia expenses in return for the southern part of Pomerania, recently taken from Sweden in the Great Northern War.
- October 17 – The Battle of Pälkäne is fought in what is now Finland between Russia and Sweden, with Russia's Fyodor Arpaskin forcing Finnish troops under Carl Gustaf Armfeldt to withdraw.
- November 6 – The Dublin election riot breaks out during the fiercely contested Irish General Election.
- November 12 – The 1713 British general election concludes with the conservative Tories winning 358 of the 558 available seats in the House of Commons, and the liberal Whigs having 200.
- December 9 – As part of the agreements made at Utrecht to end the War of the Spanish Succession, Great Britain and Spain sign a treaty of commerce and navigation.
- December 10 – The rebellion of Richard Raworth, Deputy Governor of Fort St. David (now abandoned and in the Indian state of Tamil Nadu near Cuddalore), against the British East India Company comes to an end after two months when forces sent by Bridish Madras Governor Edward Harrison to negotiate a settlement allowing Raworth to surrender in return for amnesty.
- December 21 – Victor Amadeus, Duke of Savoy is crowned King of Sicily at Palermo, and his wife Anne Marie is crowned as Queen consort. The coronation follows Spain's recognition of Sicilian independence, effective September 22, as part of the Treaty of Utrecht.

==== Date unknown ====
- Ars Conjectandi, a seminal work on probability by Jacob Bernoulli, is published eight years after his death, by his nephew, Niklaus Bernoulli.
- Basil Matthew II becomes Syriac Orthodox Maphrian of the East.
- San Basilio de Palenque officially becomes the first free African town in America, being the first independent place in America from Europeans.

=== 1714 ===
==== January–March ====
- January 21 – After being tricked into deserting a battle against India's Mughal Empire by the rebel Sayyid brothers, Prince Azz-ud-din Mirza is blinded on orders of the Emperor Farrukhsiyar as punishment.
- February 7 – The Siege of Tönning (a fortress of the Swedish Empire and now located in Germany in the state of Schleswig-Holstein) ends after almost a year, as Danish forces force the surrender of the remaining 1,600 defenders. The fortress is then leveled by the Danes.
- February 28 – (February 17 old style) Russia's Tsar Peter the Great issues a decree requiring compulsory education in mathematics for children of government officials and nobility, applying to children between the ages of 10 and 15 years old.
- March 2 – (February 19 old style) The Battle of Storkyro is fought between troops of the Swedish Empire and the Russian Empire, near what is now the village of Napue in Finland. The outnumbered Swedish forces, under the command of General Carl Gustaf Armfeldt, suffer 1,600 troops killed in action while the Russians led by General Mikhail Golitsyn lose 400 men.
- March 7 – The Treaty of Rastatt is signed between Austria and France, concluding the War of the Spanish Succession between them. Austria receives the Spanish territories in Italy (the Kingdom of Naples, Duchy of Milan and Kingdom of Sardinia), as well as the Southern Netherlands; and from France, Freiburg and Landau. The Austrian Habsburg Empire reaches its largest territorial extent yet, with Charles VI, Holy Roman Emperor succeeding Philip V of Spain, as ruler in the ceded territories.

==== April–June ====
- April 11 – France signs five separate treaties— with Great Britain, the Netherlands, Portugal, Prussia and Savoy— to end hostilities in the War of the Spanish Succession following the negotiations of the Peace of Utrecht.
- April 12 – Italian Jesuit missionary Niccolò Gianpriamo is dispatched from Portugal on an evangelical trip to Asia starting with the Portuguese Indian colony of Goa, where he arrives after five months.
- May 19 – Anne, Queen of Great Britain, refuses to allow members of the House of Hanover to settle in Britain during her lifetime.
- May 20 – Johann Sebastian Bach leads the first performance of his cantata for Pentecost, Erschallet, ihr Lieder, BWV 172, at the chapel of Schloss Weimar.
- June 3 – The city of Kassel in Germany inaugurates the summer tradition of the "water stairs" or "great cascades" (Grossen Kaskaden) emptying from the base of the Hercules monument down to the Wilhelmshöhe castle.
- June 20 – In France, Henri-Charles du Cambout de Coislin, the Roman Catholic Bishop of Metz, condemns the papal bull Unigenitus, issued by Pope Clement XI against the 1671 commentary by Pasquier Quesnel of the four Gospels and inflaming the Jansenist controversy.
- June 26 – Spain and the Netherlands sign a peace treaty to end hostilities between those two nations in the War of the Spanish Succession.

==== July–September ====
- July 8 – Longitude prize: The Parliament of Great Britain votes "to offer a reward for such person or persons as shall discover the Longitude" (£10,000 for any method capable of determining a ship's longitude within 1 degree; £15,000, within 40 minutes, and £20,000 within ½ a degree).
- July 27 – The Imperial Russian Navy gains its first important victory against the Swedish Navy in the Battle of Gangut.
- August 1 – Georg Ludwig von Braunschweig-Lüneburg, Elector of Hanover, becomes King George I of Great Britain and Ireland, on the death of Queen Anne. Anne's death brings an end to the reign of the House of Stuart, in that her half-brother James Francis Edward Stuart, the eldest son of James II of England, has been ineligible for the British throne based on the Act of Settlement 1701 had barred members of the Roman Catholic church from becoming monarchs. George of Hanover, as great-grandson of James I of England and a second cousin to Anne, is deemed the eldest living Protestant descendant of James I.
- September 11 – War of the Spanish Succession: Barcelona is taken after a year's siege, and Catalonia surrenders to Spanish and French Bourbon armies.
- September 18 – George I, the new King of Great Britain and Ireland, arrives in Britain for the first time in his life, after having departed Hannover and sailing from the Netherlands.
- September 29 – The Great Hatred: the Cossacks of the Russian Empire kill about 800 people overnight on the Finnish island of Hailuoto.

==== October–December ====
- October 20 – The coronation of George I of Great Britain and Ireland takes place in Westminster Abbey, a little less than three months after George became the new British monarch.
- October 24 – Four Dutch investors, led by brothers Nicolaas and Hendrik van Hoorn, purchase the South American colony of Berbice from French mercenary Jacques Cassard, who had captured the colony from the Van Peere family. A century later, in 1815, the land is ceded to Great Britain and later merged with neighboring colonies to form what is now Guyana.
- November 30 – King Philip V of Spain issues a decree reorganizing the Spanish government to create four ministries, with the Secretary of State being the chief minister, predecessor to the office of Prime Minister of Spain. José de Grimaldo becomes the first person to have the chief ministry.
- December 9 – Ottoman–Venetian War (1714–1718): The Ottoman Empire declares war on the Republic of Venice.

==== Date unknown ====
- Archbishop Tenison's School, the world's earliest surviving mixed gender school, is established by Thomas Tenison, Archbishop of Canterbury, in Croydon, south of London, England.
- Louis Juchereau de St. Denis establishes Fort St. Jean Baptiste, at the site of present day Natchitoches, Louisiana (the first permanent European settlement in the Louisiana Territory, after Biloxi (1699) and Mobile, Alabama (1702) were separated).
- Worcester College, University of Oxford is founded (formerly Gloucester College, closed during the Dissolution of the Monasteries).
- Stockholm County is founded.
- The river Kander (Switzerland) is redirected into Lake Thun.

=== 1715 ===
For dates within Great Britain and the British Empire, as well as in the Russian Empire, the "old style" Julian calendar was used in 1715, and can be converted to the "new style" Gregorian calendar (adopted in the British Empire in 1752 and in Russia in 1923) by adding 11 days.

==== January–March ====
- January 13 – A fire in London, described by some as the worst since the Great Fire of London (1666) almost 50 years earlier, starts on Thames Street when fireworks prematurely explode "in the house of Mr. Walker, an oil man"; more than 100 houses are consumed in the blaze, which continues over to Tower Street before it is controlled.
- January 22 – Voting begins for the British House of Commons and continues for the next 46 days in different constituencies on different days.
- February 11 – Tuscarora War: The Tuscarora and their allies sign a peace treaty with the Province of North Carolina, and agree to move to a reservation near Lake Mattamuskeet, effectively ending the Tuscarora War. Large numbers of Tuscarora subsequently move to New York.
- March 9 – Voting for the British House of Commons concludes, with the liberal Whig Party winning 341 of the 558 seats, and reducing the conservative Tory Party share to 217 seats. Spencer Compton, the Earl of Wilmington, becomes the Speaker of the House of Commons.
- March 14 – James Stuart, the "Old Pretender" attempting to restore the House of Stuart to control of Great Britain as King James III of England and James VIII of Scotland, meets with Pope Clement XI for the assistance of the Roman Catholic Church in the Jacobite rising.
- March 27 – Henry St John, 1st Viscount Bolingbroke, flees from Great Britain to France. His part in secret negotiations with France, leading to the Treaty of Utrecht, has cast suspicion on him in the eyes of the Whig government of Britain. He becomes secretary of state to the Pretender, James Edward Stuart.

==== April–June ====
- April 1 – The Battle of Gurdas Nangal begins during the Mughal-Sikh Wars in India, as the Mughal Army begins an eight-month siege of a fortress near Gurdaspur (in what is now the Punjab state), where Sikh General Banda Singh Bahadur and 1,250 of his men have fled. The siege ends on December 7 when the 750 survivors, including Banda Singh, are captured. By June 1716, most of the Sikh prisoners have been tortured, killed and executed, with Banda Singh dying on June 9.
- April 15 – In the British colonial Province of South Carolina, the Yamasee Confederation launches an attack on English settlements in disputed territory on Good Friday, launching the two-year long Yamasee War. The day before, agents Thomas Nairne, William Bray and Samuel Warner had participated in peace negotiations with the Yamasee at Pocotaligo. Bray and Warner are killed that day, while Nairne is tortured to death and dies on April 17.
- April 24 – The Battle of Fehmarn takes place in the Baltic Sea as part of the Great Northern War. Ten warships of Denmark, under the command of Christian Gabel, overwhelm a force of Swedish Navy ships led by Carl Wachtmeister. By the time the battle ends the next day, five Swedish ships and 1,626 crewmen have been captured, and another 353 killed. The Danish navy suffers 65 deaths.
- May 3 – A total solar eclipse is seen across southern England, Sweden and Finland (the last total eclipse visible in London for almost 900 years). English astronomer Edmond Halley (who is using the old style Julian calendar date of April 22) records the first observation noted of the phenomenon of "Baily's beads", in which higher elevations on the moon can be observed obscuring portions of the light moments before and after totality.
- May 28 – Rioting begins in England on the birthday of King George I as supporters of the Old Pretender, James of the House of Stuart, begin mass protesting against the rule of the House of Hanover, near London in the towns of Smithfield and Highgate, and the Cheapside financial district in London.
- June 9 – King Philip, ruler of the Kingdom of Castile and the Kingdom of Aragon unifies the two governments into a single state, centralizing rule of a unified Kingdom of Spain.
- June 22 – Tsar Peter I of Russia witnesses the attempt of 45 Dutch and English ships to enter the small harbor at Saint Petersburg and decides that additional harbors are necessary for Russia to be able import Western goods.
- June 29 – Britain's Treason Act 1714 takes effect, providing for forfeiture to the British Crown of property owned by any person convicted of treason in the Kingdom. The Act remains in effect until June 24, 1718.

==== July–September ====
- July 20 – Ottoman–Venetian War (1714–18): The fall of Nauplion, the capital of the Venetian "Kingdom of the Morea", seals the fate of the Peloponnese Peninsula, which is soon completely retaken by the Ottomans.
- July 24 – 1715 Treasure Fleet: A Spanish treasure fleet of 12 ships, under General Don Juan Ubilla, leaves Havana, Cuba for Spain. Seven days later, 11 of them sink in a storm off the coast of Florida (some centuries later, treasure salvage is found from these wrecks).
- August 31 – Old Dock, Liverpool, England, the world's first enclosed commercial wet dock (Thomas Steers, engineer), opens.
- September 1 – King Louis XIV of France dies after a reign of 72 years, leaving his throne to his 5 year old great-grandson Louis XV. Philippe d'Orléans, the nephew of Louis XIV, serves as Regent.
- September 6 – The first major Jacobite rising in Scotland against the rule of King George I of Great Britain breaks out. The Earl of Mar raises the standard of James Edward Stuart, and marches on Edinburgh. James, the son of the deposed King James VII, arrives from France.
- September 14 – Less than two weeks after King Louis XIV's death, Daniel Voysin de la Noiraye, France's Secretary of State for War since 1709, steps down at the request of the new regent, the Duke of Orleans.

==== October–December ====
- October 2 – During the rebellion in Great Britain by supporters of the Pretender to the Throne, James Stuart, the Jacobites raid the Scottish parish of Burntisland, capture an arsenal of weapons, and begin an occupation of the area on October 9 in the name of Stuart as King James VIII of Scotland.
- October 11 – William Aislabie resigns as the British East India Company's administrator of Bombay and the company's territories and is replaced at year's end by Charles Boone.
- October 12
  - William Mackintosh of Borlum, leader of the Jacobite rising against Great Britain, lands with 1,500 men in Scotland after crossing the Firth of Forth from France.
  - Baron Onslow resigns as Great Britain's Chancellor of the Exchequer and is replaced by future Prime Minister Robert Walpole.
- October 28 – The Treaty of Greifswald is signed between Russia and the Electorate of Hanover, with George I of Great Britain and Hanover agreeing to Russia's annexation of Swedish Ingria and Estonia, and Hanover claiming the Bremen-Verden Swedish duchies of Bremen and Verden.
- November 13 – Jacobite rising in Scotland – Battle of Sheriffmuir: The forces of the Kingdom of Great Britain, led by John Campbell, 2nd Duke of Argyll, halt the Jacobite advance, although the action is inconclusive.
- November 14 – Battle of Preston: Government forces defeat the Jacobite incursion, at the conclusion of a five-day siege and action.
- November 15 – The Third Barrier Treaty is signed by Britain, the Holy Roman Empire and the Dutch Republic.
- November 28 – The application of the Nueva Planta decrees, in Majorca and the other Balearic Islands (formerly under the Crown of Aragon), bring them under the laws of the Crown of Castile.
- December 22 – James Edward Stuart rejoins Jacobite rebels in Scotland, but fails to rouse his army.

==== Date unknown ====
- Karlsruhe Palace is built, resulting in the town of Karlsruhe growing up around it.
- The ancient right to evaluate royal decrees publicly, before they are given the force of law by the Parlement of Paris, is restored.
- Filippo Juvarra starts working on the previously postponed construction of the church of Santa Christina in Turin.
- Filippo Juvarra starts rebuilding the church of San Filippo Neri, Turin, in which the roof had collapsed, during the siege of Turin, during the War of the Spanish Succession.
- Coffee is first grown in the French colony of Saint-Domingue.
- Around this year, a breech loading firearm is made for Philip V of Spain.

=== 1716 ===
==== January–March ====
- January 16 – The application of the Nueva Planta decrees to Catalonia make it subject to the laws of the Crown of Castile, and abolishes the Principality of Catalonia as a political entity, concluding the unification of Spain under Philip V.
- January 27 – The Tugaloo massacre changes the course of the Yamasee War, allying the Cherokee nation with the British province of South Carolina against the Creek Indian nation.
- January 28 – The town of Crieff, Scotland, is burned to the ground by Jacobites returning from the Battle of Sheriffmuir.
- February 3 – The 1716 Algiers earthquake sequence began with an M_{w} 7.0 mainshock that caused severe damage and killed 20,000 in Algeria.
- February 10 – James Edward Stuart flees from Scotland to France with a handful of supporters, following the failure of the Jacobite rising of 1715.
- February 24 – Jacobite leaders James Radclyffe, 3rd Earl of Derwentwater and William Gordon, 6th Viscount of Kenmure are executed in London.
- March 6 – At night, an aurora borealis was seen throughout Europe, from Ireland to Italy.
- March 8 – King Charles XII of Sweden leads an invasion of Norway, crossing the border at Basmo, near the modern-day town of Marker.
- March 10 – Simon Fraser, a former Scottish rebel who had helped end the Siege of Inverness during the first Jacobite rising, is given a pardon by King George I of Great Britain.
- March 18 – Italian Jesuit missionary Ippolito Desideri arrives in Lhasa to become one of the first Europeans to attempt to bring Christianity to Buddhist Tibet.
- March 23 – Jeremias III becomes the new Ecumenical Patriarch of Constantinople, leader of the Eastern Orthodox Christian Church.

==== April–June ====
- April 13 – Austria, ruled by King Charles VI, renews its alliance with the Republic of Venice, leading the Ottoman Empire, ruled by Ahmed III, to declare war.
- May 20 – John Law founds the Banque Générale Privée in Paris.
- May 26 – Two regular companies of field artillery, each 100 men strong, are raised at Woolwich, by Royal Warrant of King George I of Great Britain.
- May 28 – John Churchill, 1st Duke of Marlborough, suffers a paralytic stroke.
- June 9 – In India, 600 imprisoned members of the failed Sikh Khalsa rebellion against the Mughal Empire are executed on orders of the Emperor Farrukhsiyar. Banda Singh Bahadur, leader of the rebellion, is brutally tortured and mutilated before being killed.
- June 19 – The new Tokugawa Shogun of Japan, Tokugawa Yoshimune, assumes control of the monarchy's military after the illness and death of the six-year-old Ietsugu, last of the male descendants of Tokugawa Ieyasu. Yoshimune's ascendancy begins Year 1 of the Kyōhō Era, which continues until Year 21 in 1736.
- June 25 – With the Holy Roman Empire having been ceded the "Southern Netherlands" (now Belgium) from Spain, Prince Eugene of Savoy arrives in Brussels as the first Governor-General of the Austrian Netherlands. Eugene soon returns home and leaves administration of the area to a dictatorial Hercule-Louis Turinetti.

==== July–September ====
- July 5 – Prince Ernest Augustus is created Duke of York and Albany, in the peerage of Great Britain.
- July 8 – The Battle of Dynekilen: The Swedish fleet is defeated by a Danish–Norwegian fleet.
- July 8–August 21 – Seventh Ottoman–Venetian War: The Ottoman Empire unsuccessfully lays siege to Corfu, the last bastion of the Republic of Venice in the Greek islands.
- August 3 – Natchez, one of the oldest towns on the Mississippi River, is founded by French civilians at the site of Fort Rosalie.
- August 4 – George Seton, 5th Earl of Winton, under sentence of death for his part in the Jacobite rising of 1715, escapes from the Tower of London and flees into exile on the continent.
- August 5 – Battle of Petrovaradin: 83,300 Austrian troops of Prince Eugene of Savoy defeat 150,000 Ottoman Turks under Silahdar Damat Ali Pasha (who is killed).
- August 24 – Charles VI, Holy Roman Emperor, returns from Italy.
- September 15 – "Maria", an African slave of the Dutch West India Company on the Caribbean island of Curaçao, murders the plantation overseer, Christiaan Muller, then leads a rebellion, killing Muller's family and much of the white staff on the company's plantation. The uprising is suppressed after 10 days, and Maria is later executed by burning at the stake on November 9.
- September 26 – Alexei Petrovich, Tsarevich of Russia, eldest son of the Tsar Peter the Great and heir to the throne, flees from Saint Petersburg with his mistress, Efrosinya Fedorova, along with her brother and three servants. After spending more than a year in Austria, he returns to Russia where he is arrested and dies in prison in 1718.

==== October–December ====
- October 12 – During the war between the Habsburg Empire ruling Austria and the Ottoman Empire ruling Turkey, the six week siege of the fortified city of Temeşvar is surrendered by the Turks to the Austrians. Under a flag of truce, the Turks are permitted to depart but have to leave behind their artillery as they give up their claim to Hungary. Austro-Hungarian rule lasts until World War One, and in 1919, the city of Timișoara becomes part of the Kingdom of Romania.
- November 1 – Two new laws go into effect in the Highlands of Scotland to prevent a threat to Britain's ruling House of Hanover by the Jacobites who supported the restoration of the House of Stuart. The Disarming Act requires government authorization to carry swords and firearms, and the amendments to the Treason Act 1714 permit trials for treason to take place in any court in England, regardless of where the crime was committed.
- December 4 – Fifty people are killed, and 150 houses burned, when a fire breaks out in Wapping, London. The blaze comes two days after a fire at the Spring Gardens at St. James's, London, which destroyed the French Chapel there and which was put out by several rescuers, including the future King George II.
- December 12 – Charles Townshend, 2nd Viscount Townshend, is demoted from his office as Secretary of State for the Northern Department in the British government, and replaced by James Stanhope, 1st Earl Stanhope. This is a move towards the Whig Split of 1717.

==== Date unknown ====
- English pirate Edward Teach (Blackbeard) is given command of a sloop in the Bahamas.
- Tsar Peter the Great of Russia studies with the physician Herman Boerhaave, at Leiden University.
- The Kangxi Dictionary is published, laying the foundation of most references to Han characters studied today.

=== 1717 ===
==== January–March ====
- January 1 – Count Carl Gyllenborg, the Swedish ambassador to the Kingdom of Great Britain, is arrested in London over a plot to assist the Pretender to the British throne, James Francis Edward Stuart.
- January 4 (December 24, 1716 Old Style) – The kingdoms of Great Britain, France and the Dutch Republic sign the Triple Alliance, in an attempt to maintain the Treaty of Utrecht (1713), Britain having signed a preliminary alliance with France on November 28 (November 17) 1716.
- February 1 – The Silent Sejm, in the Polish–Lithuanian Commonwealth, marks the beginning of the Russian Empire's increasing influence and control over the Commonwealth.
- February 6 – Following the treaty between France and Britain, the Pretender James Stuart leaves France, and seeks refuge with Pope Clement XI.
- February 26–March 6 – What becomes the northeastern United States is paralyzed by a series of blizzards that bury the region.
- March 2 – Dancer John Weaver performs in the first ballet in Britain, shown at the Theatre Royal, Drury Lane, The Loves of Mars and Venus.
- March 31 – Benjamin Hoadly, Bishop of Bangor, brings the Bangorian Controversy within the Church of England into the open by delivering a sermon to, and supposedly at the request of, King George I of Great Britain, on The Nature of the Kingdom of Christ with the text "My kingdom is not of this world" (John 18:36), concluding there is no Biblical justification for church government.

==== April–June ====
- April 26 – The Whydah Gally, flagship of English pirate "Black Sam" Bellamy, is wrecked in a storm off Wellfleet, Massachusetts. The Whydah sinks with a reputed 4 1/2 tons of treasure on board, and all but two of her crew are lost, including Bellamy.
- May 27 – Spain creates the Viceroyalty of New Granada in South America from the northern section of the Viceroyalty of Peru. The viceroyalty, with a capital at Bogota, later declares independence and splits up into what become the nations of Colombia, Ecuador and Venezuela.
- June 24 – The Premier Grand Lodge of England, the Modern and first Free-Masonic Grand Lodge (which merges with the Ancient Grand Lodge of England in 1813 to form the United Grand Lodge of England), is founded in London.

==== July–September ====
- July 17 – Water Music by George Frederick Handel is first performed, on a Thames barge in London.
- August 17 – The month-long Siege of Belgrade ends, with Prince Eugene of Savoy's Austrian troops capturing the city from the Ottoman Empire.
- August 22 – Spanish troops arrive on the island of Sardinia, at this time a part of the Holy Roman Empire, beginning the conquest of the island, completed by October 30.
- September 5 – King George I of Great Britain issues the "Proclamation for Suppressing of Pirates in the West Indies", an offer of amnesty to pirates, declaring that any pirates who surrender themselves to the government of Britain or one of its overseas territories, on or before September 5, 1718, "shall have Our Gracious Pardon of and for his or their Piracy or Piracies" committed before January 5, 1718. The amnesty is later extended to July 1, 1719.
- September 21 – The first known Druid revival ceremony is held by John Toland at Primrose Hill, in London, at the Autumnal Equinox, to found the Mother Grove, what will later become the Ancient Order of Druids.
- September 29 – Guatemala earthquake: A 7.4 magnitude earthquake strikes Antigua Guatemala, destroying much of the city, and making authorities consider moving the capital of Guatemala to a different location.

==== October–December ====
- October 9 – King Philip V of Spain orders the closure of all universities in Catalonia, including the historic Estudi General de Lleida.
- October 16 – Antonio Vivaldi's opera Tieteberga is performed for the first time, premiering at the Teatro San Moisè in Venice
- October 18 – Trial begins in Boston for six pirates who had survived the April 26 wreck of Samuel Bellamy's ships Whydah and the Mary Anne. Five of them (John Brown, Hendrick Quintor, Thomas Baker, Peter Cornelius Hoof and John Shuan) are convicted on October 22 of piracy and robbery and hanged on November 15.
- October 30 – The Spanish conquest of Sardinia, at this time part of the Holy Roman Empire, is finished two months after Spanish forces had landed on the island on August 22, as the last Sardinian outpost, Castelsardo, surrenders.
- November 28 – Pirates led by Edward Teach, more popularly referred to as "Blackbeard", and Benjamin Hornigold capture the French slave transport Concorde near island of Saint Vincent the West Indies. Blackbeard renames the vessel Queen Anne's Revenge, adds to its armaments, and makes it his flagship. Hornigold soon accepts a British amnesty for all pirates, and Blackbeard teams up with Stede Bonnet and begins plundering ships approaching North American ports.
- December 9 (November 29, O.S.) – King George I of Great Britain banishes his son and daughter-in-law, George, Prince of Wales and Caroline of Ansbach, from the royal household after the Prince threatens the King's personal assistant, the Duke of Newcastle, the royal Lord Chamberlain. The altercation takes place at the baptismal ceremony for the Prince's newborn son, George William.
- December 24–25 – Christmas flood: A disastrous flood hits the North Sea coast, between the Netherlands and Denmark; thousands die or lose their houses.

==== Date unknown ====
- The 1717 Omani invasion of Bahrain removes the control of Persia over the Arabian kingdom of Bahrain.
- François-Marie Arouet is sentenced to imprisonment in the Bastille for eleven months, because of a satirical verse against the Régent of France and his infamous daughter Marie Louise Élisabeth d'Orléans, who is hiding an illegitimate pregnancy and soon to give birth; Arouet will emerge with the pseudonym Voltaire and the completed text of his first play, Œdipe.
- The Tatar invasions in Transylvania devastate many towns, including Cavnic, Sighet and Dej.
- Lady Mary Wortley Montagu, wife of the British ambassador to Istanbul, has her son inoculated.
- The Casa de Contratación (House of Trade) is set up in Cádiz.
- Maharaja Pamheiba of Manipur is converted to Hinduism by Shantidas Goswami, and decrees it to be the official religion of his state.
- Most recent rupture of New Zealand's Alpine Fault, with an earthquake estimated to have had a magnitude between 7.8 and 8.1.
- The Charleville musket enters service in France.
- Thomas Fairchild, a nurseryman at Hoxton in the East End of London, becomes the first person to produce a successful scientific plant hybrid, Dianthus Caryophyllus barbatus, known as Fairchild's Mule.
- Murshid Quli Khan declares himself the first Nawab of the Bengal Subah. The Nawabs of Bengal will effectively function as near-sovereign rulers of Bengal while being nominally loyal to the Mughal Empire.

=== 1718 ===
==== January – March ====
- January 7 – In India, Sufi rebel leader Shah Inayat Shaheed from Sindh who had led attacks against the Mughal Empire, is beheaded days after being tricked into meeting with the Mughals to discuss peace.
- January 17 – Jeremias III reclaims his role as the Ecumenical Patriarch of Constantinople, chief leader within the Eastern Orthodox Church, 16 days after the Metropolitan Cyril IV of Pruoza had engineered an election to become the Patriarch.
- February 14 – The reign of Victor Amadeus over the principality of Anhalt-Bernburg (now within the state of Saxony-Anhalt in northeastern Germany) ends after 61 years and 7 months. He had ascended the throne on September 22, 1656. He is succeeded by his son Karl Frederick.
- February 21 – Manuel II (Mpanzu a Nimi) becomes the new monarch of the Kingdom of Kongo (located in western Africa in present day Angola) when King Pedro IV (Nusamu a Mvemba) dies after a reign of 22 years. Manuel reigns until 1743.
- March 12 – Anton Florian becomes the new Prince of Liechtenstein, succeeding Joseph Wenzel
- March 13 – Daniel Overbeek becomes the new Dutch Governor of Ceylon (now the nation of Sri Lanka), arriving after a 10-month sea voyage from the Netherlands.
- March 18 – Edward Wortley Montagu, the four-year-old son of the British Ambassador to Turkey, becomes the first British person to be inoculated with the smallpox vaccine, administered by Dr. Charles Maitland at the request of Edward's mother, Lady Mary Wortley Montagu.
- March 20 – The Privy Council of the United Kingdom, at the time the British Government prior to the creation of the officer of Prime Minister, is reorganized, with a reorganized Second Stanhope–Sunderland ministry. Secretary of State for the Northern Department Charles Spencer, 3rd Earl of Sunderland succeeds James Stanhope as the new First Lord of the Treasury, and Stanhope takes Sunderland's job.

==== April – June ====
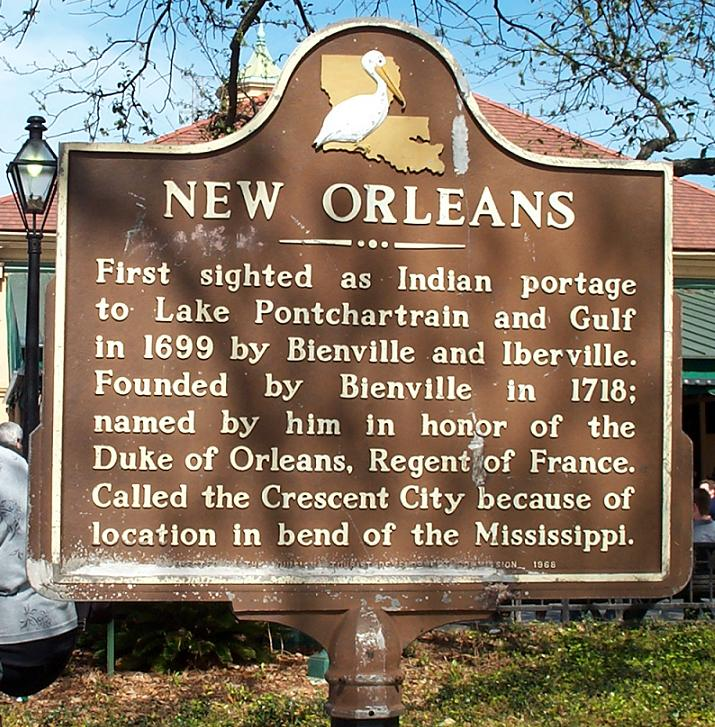
May 7: New Orleans

- April 4 – Great Britain, France and the Dutch Republic agree on the phasing out of the authority of the House of Medici over the semi-independent Grand Duchy of Tuscany by declaring that Gian Gastone de' Medici will be the last of the Medici family to rule the Italian duchy and that Spain's House of Borbón will eventually control the Tuscan monarchy. Don Carlos of Spain, the two-year old son of King Philip V, is designated as the eventual heir, despite the objections of the 75-year old Grand Duke, Cosimo III de' Medici.
- May 1 – San Antonio is founded by Father Antonio de San Buenaventura y Olivares with the construction of the initial Mission San Antonio de Valero.
- May 7 – The settlement of New Orleans is founded in New France.
- May 22 – Sailing the Queen Anne's Revenge English pirate Edward Teach ("Blackbeard") leads 400 sailors in four ships, and blockades the port of Charleston, South Carolina for an entire week, plundering all arriving ships. After their departure, Queen Anne's Revenge and Adventure are both lost at Beaufort Inlet, North Carolina; a week later. Blackbeard allows Stede Bonnet to command the Revenge (which is renamed the Royal James) once again. Bonnet rescues 25 sailors abandoned by Blackbeard on a sandbar and continues his life of piracy.
- June 3 – Pirates "Blackbeard" and Stede Bonnet accidentally run aground in the ship Queen Anne's Revenge after sailing into Topsail Inlet in the British colony of North Carolina. Learning of the royal pardon available to all pirates who surrender before September 5, Teach negotiates a settlement with Colonial Governor Charles Eden for a pardon for himself, Bonnet and the rest of his crew in return for the Governor receiving some of the pirates' plunder.
- June 16 – The Treaty of Baden is signed, ending the Toggenburg War.
- June 19 – A 7.5 earthquake shakes Tongwei County in China, killing 73,000 people.

==== July–September ====
- July 21 – The Treaty of Passarowitz, ending the Austro-Turkish War, is signed.
- July 25 – At the behest of Tsar Peter the Great, the construction of Kadriorg Palace, dedicated to his wife Catherine, began in Tallinn.
- August 11 – Battle of Cape Passaro: a Spanish fleet is defeated by the British Royal Navy under Admiral George Byng, off Capo Passero, Sicily, a prelude to the War of the Quadruple Alliance.
- September 10 – In France, Armande Félice de La Porte Mazarin and the Vicomtesse de Polignac, both mistresses of the Duc de Richelieu, fight a duel with pistols at the Bois de Boulogne near Paris. Lady Mazarin, who had initiated the duel, is wounded in the shoulder and both survive. Richelieu, though impressed by the willingness of the ladies to fight over his affections, comments Je ne sacrifierai pas un de mes cheveux, ni à l’une, ni à l’autre ("I will not sacrifice anything, not to one, nor to the other.")
- September 27 – The Battle of Cape Fear River begins as pirate Stede Bonnet and his crew on the Royal James are confronted in North Carolina by Colonel William Rhett and the ships Henry and Sea Nymph.
- September – In Tibet, forces of the Tibetan Dzungar Khanate destroys an advancing expedition of the Chinese Imperial Army, under the command of General Erentei, in the Battle of the Salween River.

==== October –December ====
- October 3 – Stede Bonnet and his crew are captured near the mouth of the Cape Fear River and taken to Charleston, South Carolina, where they are tried for piracy. All but four are found guilty and sentenced to death (with 22 hanged on November 8), but Bonnet escapes from prison on October 24.
- October 31 – The Mughal Emperor of India, Farrukhsiyar, restores the titles and responsibilities of his chief adviser, Mir Jumla III, almost three years after dismissing him.
- November 11 – Lightning strikes the powder magazine at the Old Fortress, Corfu, causing an explosion that kills a large number of people on the island.
- November 18 – Voltaire's first play, Oedipus, premières at the Comédie-Française in Paris. This is his first use of the pseudonym.
- November 22 – Citing violations of the amnesty agreement with Blackbeard, Virginia Governor Alexander Spotswood sends a Royal Navy contingent to North Carolina, where they battle Blackbeard and his crew in Ocracoke Inlet. Blackbeard is killed in action, after receiving five musketball wounds and twenty sword lacerations.
- December 4 – Fifty people are killed, and 150 houses burned, when a fire breaks out in Wapping, London. The blaze comes two days after a fire at the Spring Gardens at St. James's, London, which destroyed the French Chapel there and which was put out by several rescuers, including the future King George II.
- December 5 – Following the death of Charles XII on November 30, his sister Ulrika Eleonora proclaims herself Queen regnant of Sweden, as the news of her brother's death reaches Stockholm.
- December 10 – Stede Bonnet is hanged at Charleston, after being recaptured.
- December 17 – The Holy Roman Empire, Kingdom of Great Britain and Dutch Republic join the Kingdom of France in formally declaring war on Spain, launching the War of the Quadruple Alliance.

==== Date unknown ====
- Islamization of Sudan: The Funj warrior aristocracy deposes the reigning mek and places one of their own ranks on the throne of Sennar.
- The white potato reaches New England from England.
- Coffee is grown in Surinam (Dutch colony).

=== 1719 ===
==== January–March ====
- January 8 – Carolean Death March begins: A catastrophic retreat by a largely-Finnish Swedish-Carolean army under the command of Carl Gustaf Armfeldt across the Tydalen mountains in a blizzard kills around 3,700 men and cripples a further 600 for life.
- January 23 – The Principality of Liechtenstein is created, within the Holy Roman Empire.
- February 3 (January 23 Old Style) – The Riksdag of the Estates recognizes Ulrika Eleonora's claim to the Swedish throne, after she has agreed to sign a new Swedish constitution. Thus, she is recognized as queen regnant of Sweden.
- February 20 – The first Treaty of Stockholm is signed.
- February 28 – Farrukhsiyar, the Mughal Emperor of India since 1713, is deposed by the Sayyid brothers, who install Rafi ud-Darajat in his place. In prison, Farrukhsiyar is strangled by assassins on April 19.
- March 6 – A serious earthquake (estimated magnitude >7) in El Salvador results in large fractures, liquefaction zones, and a sulphuric gas leak. It destroys houses, churches and monasteries.
- March 17 – The coronation of Ulrika Eleonora as Queen of Sweden takes place in Stockholm.

==== April–June ====
- April 4 – The French army under James FitzJames, 1st Duke of Berwick invades the Basque provinces of Spain, with 20,000 troops crossing into Navarre.
- April 19 – In Louisiana (New France), Jean-Baptiste Le Moyne, Sieur de Bienville's brother Serigny arrives on a French man-of-war, bringing news that war had been declared between France and Spain (since December 1718).
- April 25 – Daniel Defoe publishes Robinson Crusoe.
- April 26 – King Philip V of Spain departs Madrid and leads 15,000 men of the Spanish Army into Navare to fight the French under Berwick.
- May 14 – In Louisiana (New France), Bienville, from Mobile, captures Pensacola, but Pensacola is later recaptured by the Spanish, and again re-taken by Bienville.
- May 25 – An earthquake in Turkey damages İzmit and Istanbul, damaging some city walls and ruining mosques and palaces.
- June 4 – Battle of Ösel Island: A Russian naval force defeats the Swedish fleet.
- June 18 – Captain John Perry fixes Dagenham Breach.
- June 10 – Battle of Glen Shiel: British forces defeat the Jacobites and their Spanish allies.
- June 20 – Battle of Francavilla: The Austrians are defeated by the Spanish.
- June 30 – French forces under the Duke of Berwick open the Siege of San Sebastian

==== July–September ====
- July 11 – Russia's Baltic Sea fleet is first spotted from the Swedish coast, starting the Russian Pillage of 1719–21 as part of the Great Northern War.
- July 16 – The Carlsten fortress in Sweden surrenders to a Danish and Norwegian force after a siege of seven days. Colonel Henrich Danckwardt, who surrendered the fortress to Peter Tordenskjold after being away from it while it was still defensible, is beheaded on September 16.
- August 13 – In the Battle of Stäket, Crown Prince Frederick I of Sweden leads the successful defense of Stockholm from Russian Admiral Fyodor Apraksin's Baltic Fleet during the Russian Pillage.
- August 19 – Siege of San Sebastian. The Spanish garrison surrenders to the Duke of Berwick.
- August 20 – Princess Maria Josepha of Austria, at one time the heir presumptive to the throne of Austria's Habsburg Empire, marries Frederick Augustus, Elector of Saxony ten days after renouncing any claim to the Austrian throne.
- September 3 – The three-story tall Opernhaus am Zwinger, one of the largest opera houses in the world at the time, opens in Dresden by staging Antonio Lotti's Giovi in Argo.
- September 29 – Muhammad Shah is crowned as the 12th Mughal Emperor of India at Shahjahanabad (now Delhi), 12 days after the death of Shah Jahan II from tuberculosis.

==== October–December ====
- October 11 – Fernando Manuel de Bustillo Bustamante y Rueda, the Spanish Governor-General of the Philippines, is assassinated in a bloody coup d'etat by supporters of the Archbishop of Manila, whom Bustamante had imprisoned.
- October 14 – The British Army, under the command of Major General George Wade, invades and captures the forts of Vigo on the Atlantic coast of Spain.
- October 21 – The Red Canal is opened in the Russian capital, Saint Petersburg, after seven years of construction, at a ceremony in the presence of the Tsar Peter the Great.
- October 28 – Sweden and Denmark-Norway sign an armistice, halting combat in the Great Northern War between them, with final terms agreed to in the Treaty of Frederiksborg on July 3, 1720.
- November 9 – In a treaty between Sweden and Hanover at the close of the Great Northern War, Sweden cedes the Duchies of Bremen and Verden (in northern Germany) to Hanover.
- December 22 – Andrew Bradford publishes the American Weekly Mercury, Pennsylvania's first newspaper.

==== Date unknown ====
- Prussia conducts Europe's first systematic census.
- Miners in Falun, Sweden find the apparently petrified body of Fet-Mats Israelsson (d. 1677), in an unused part of the copper mine.
- Raine's Foundation School, Bethnal Green (founded by Henry Raine), opens in Wapping, England.
- James Figg opens one of the first indoor venues for combat sports, adjoining the City of Oxford tavern in Oxford Road, London.

== Births ==
1710

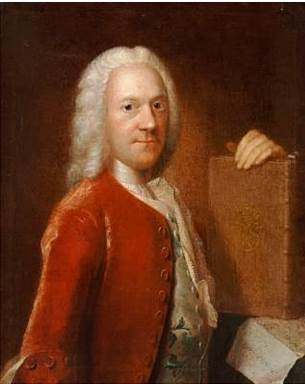
Jakob Langebek born 23 January

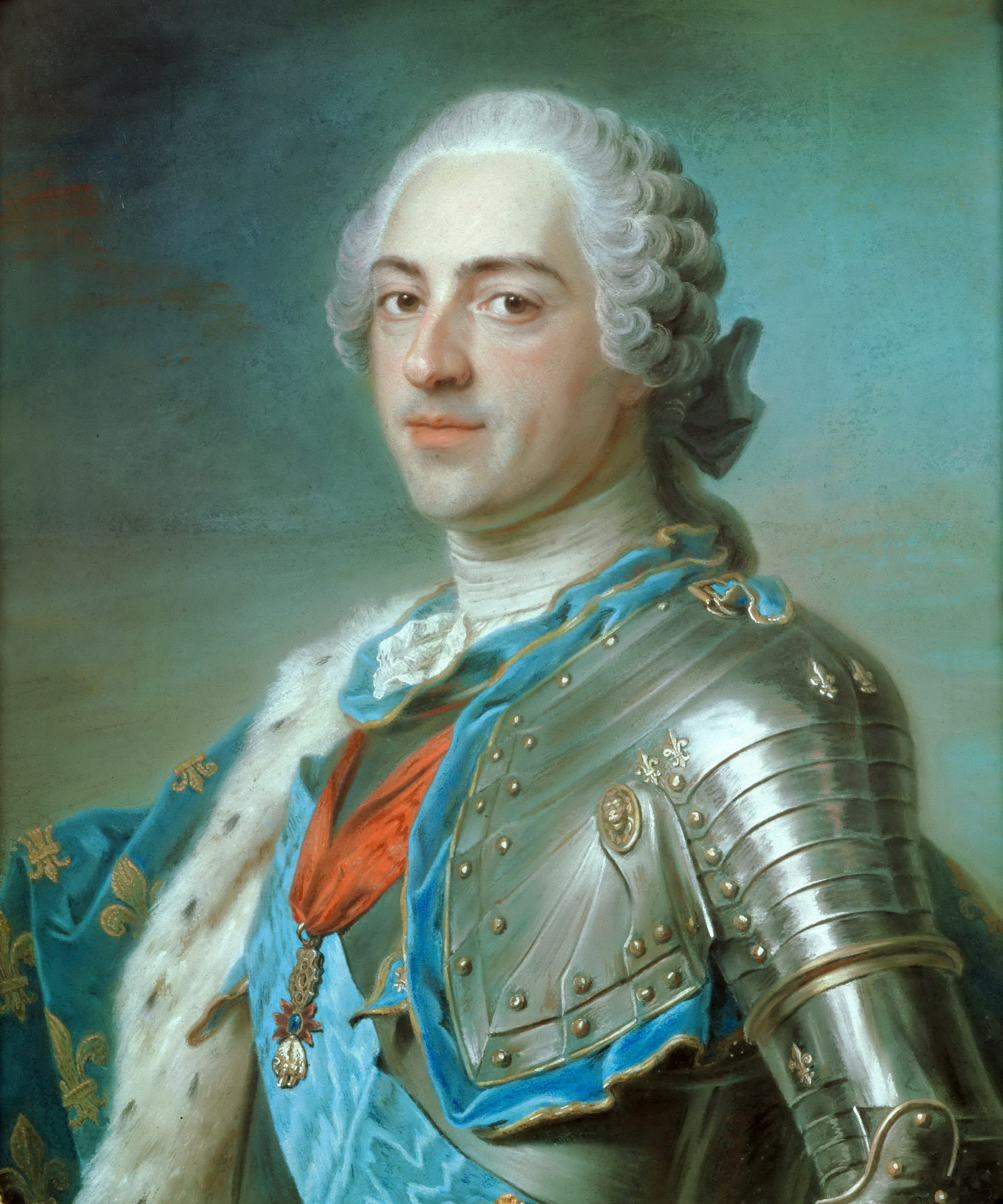
Louis XV of France born 15 February

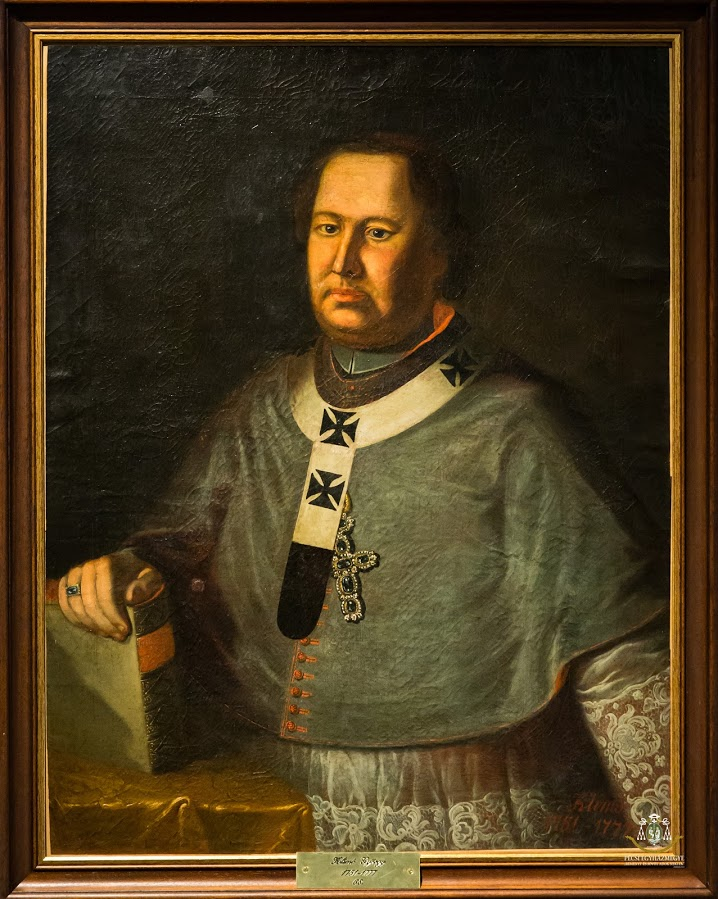
György Klimó born 4 April

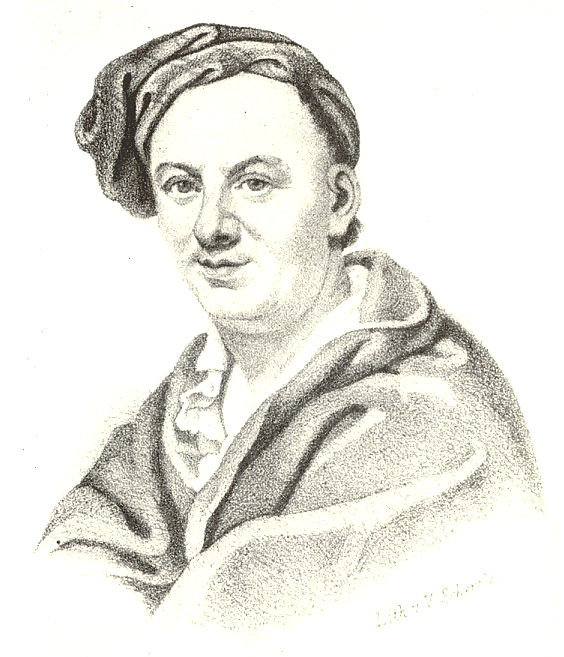
Peter Anton von Verschaffelt born 8 May

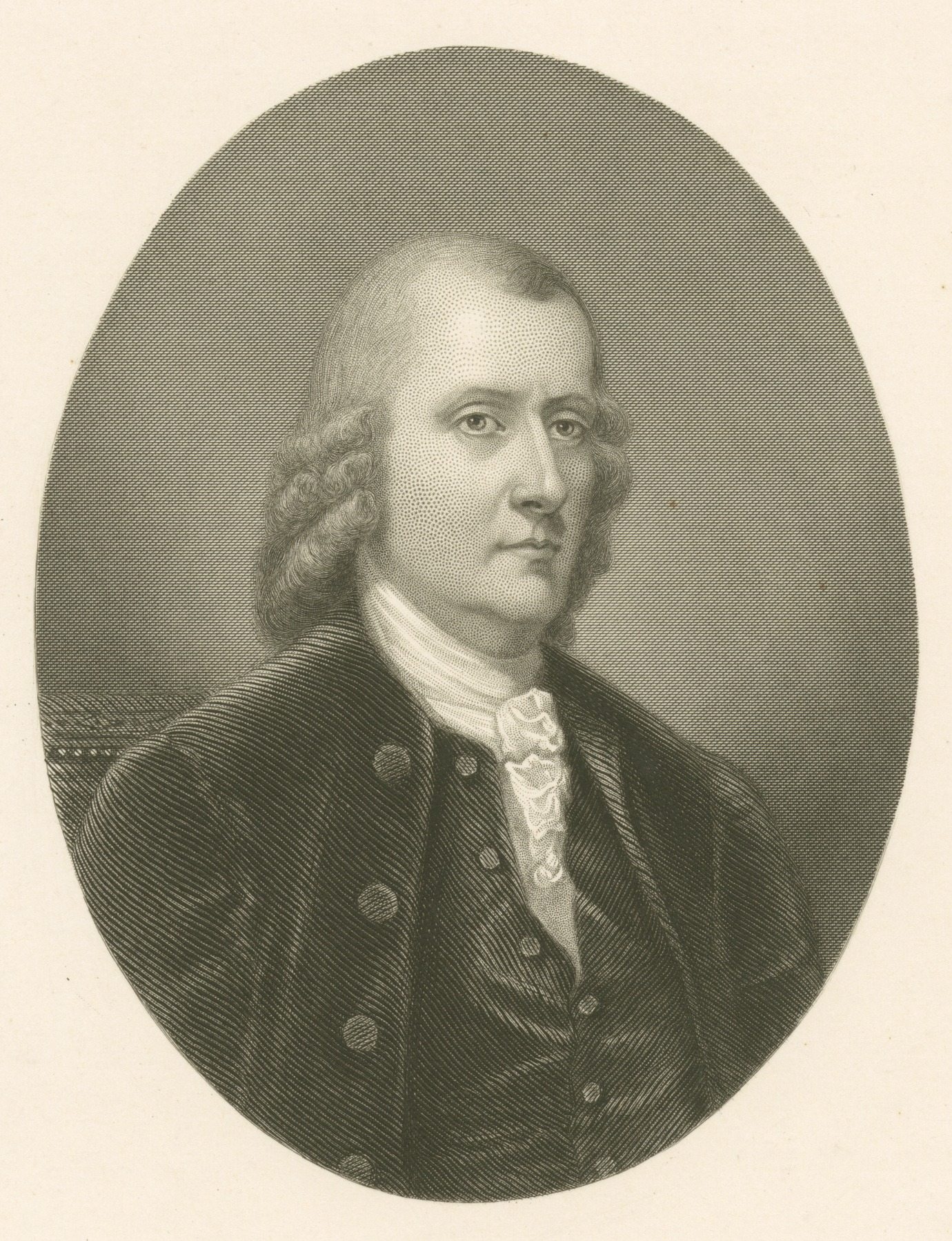
John Cruger Jr. born 18 July

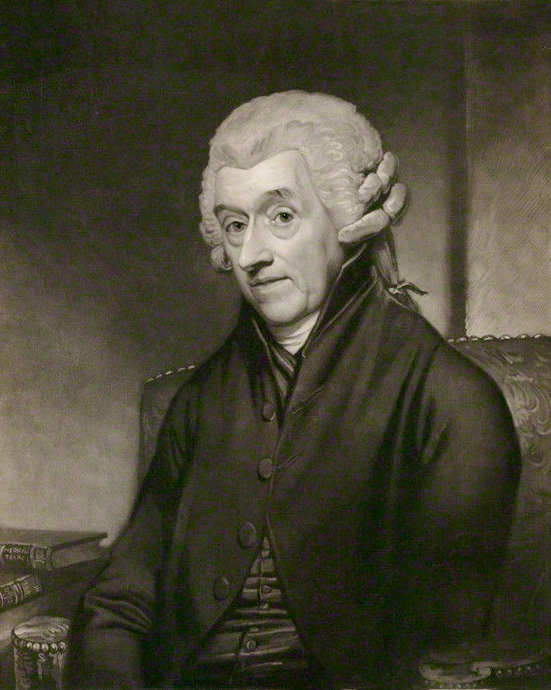
William Heberden born 13 August

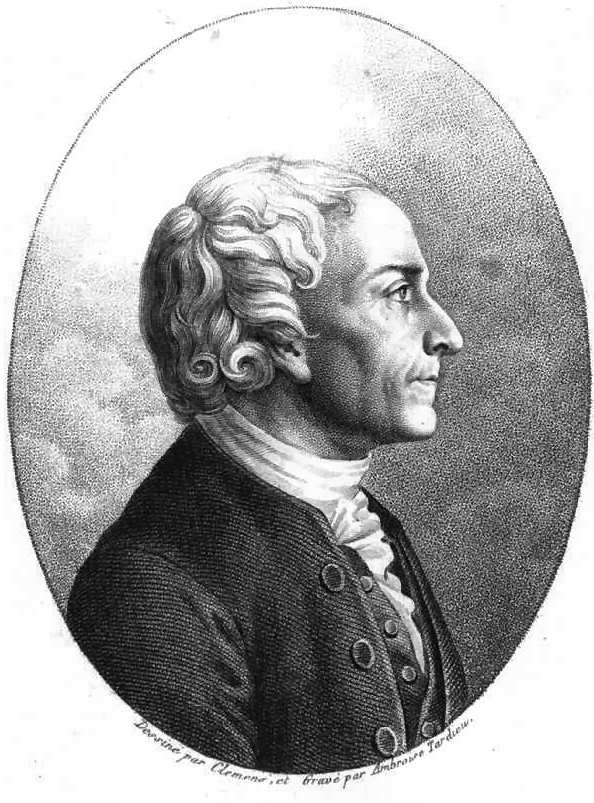
Abraham Trembley born 3 September

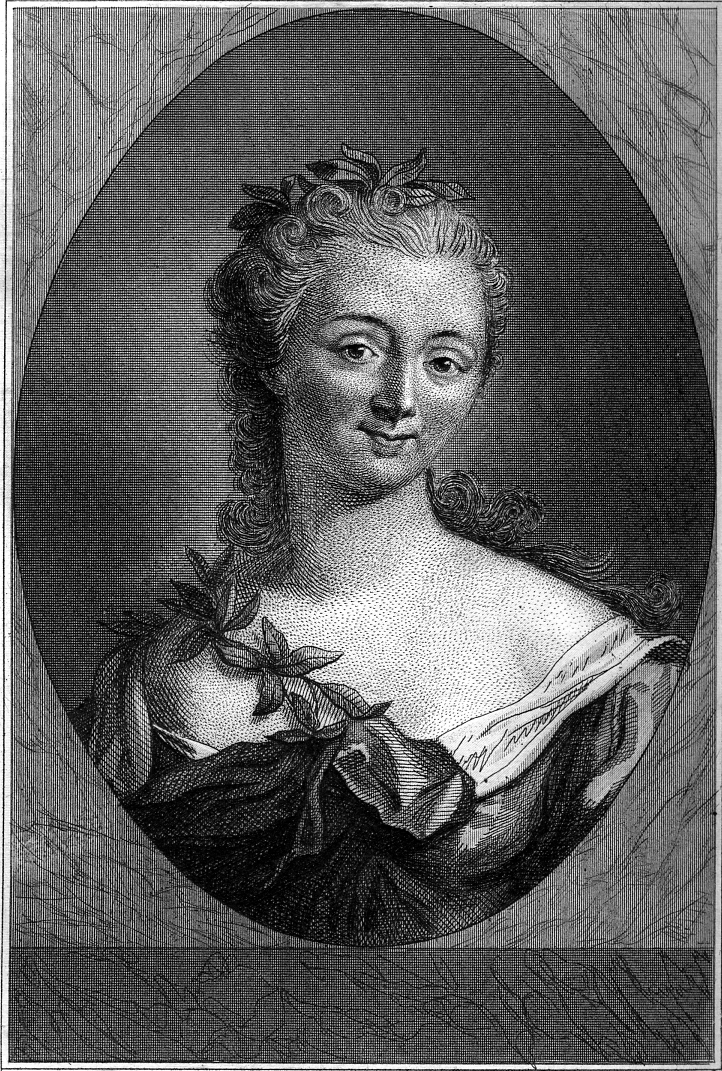
Anne-Marie du Boccage born 22 October

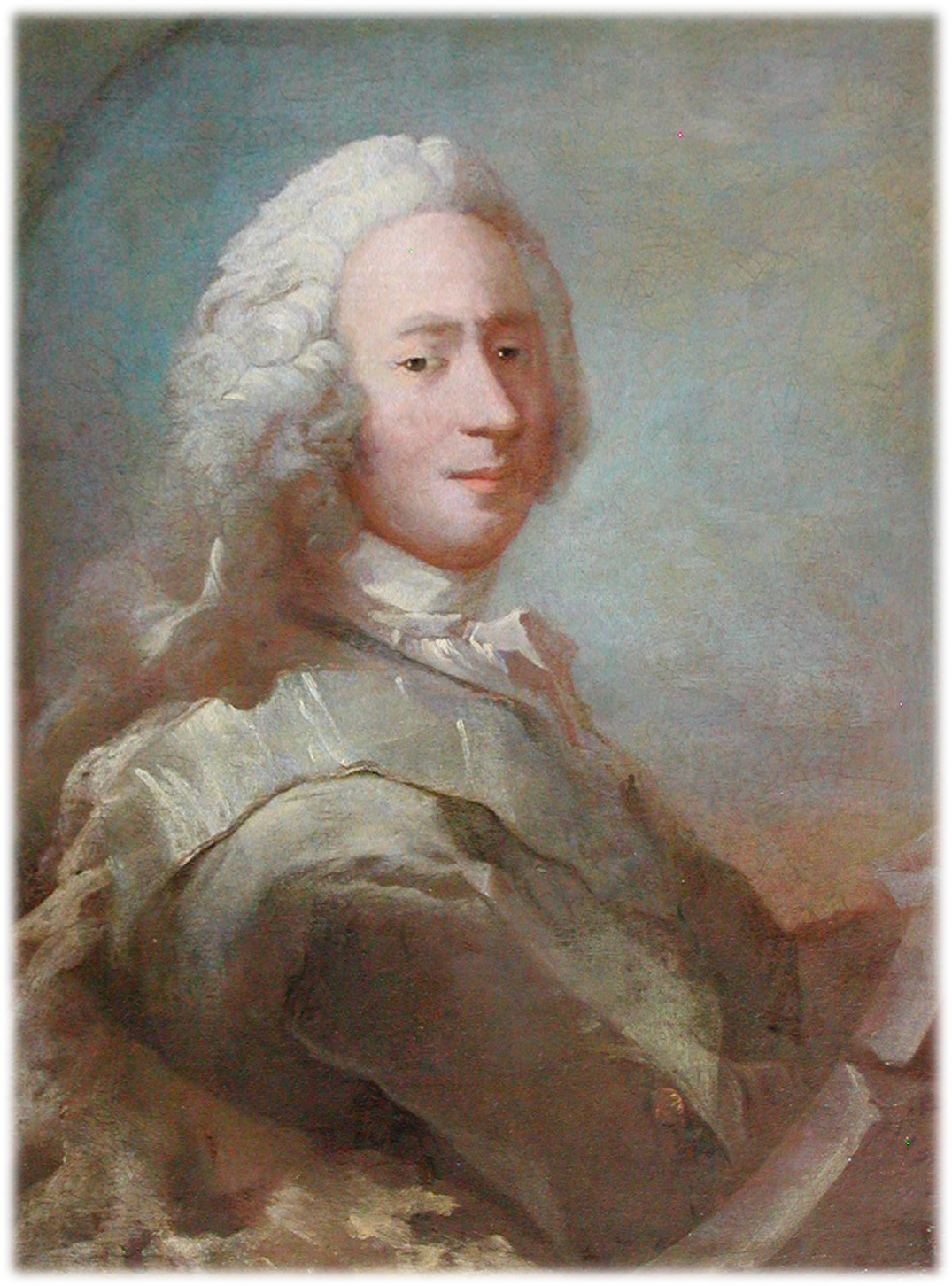
Adam Gottlob Moltke born 10 November

Paolo Renier born 21 November

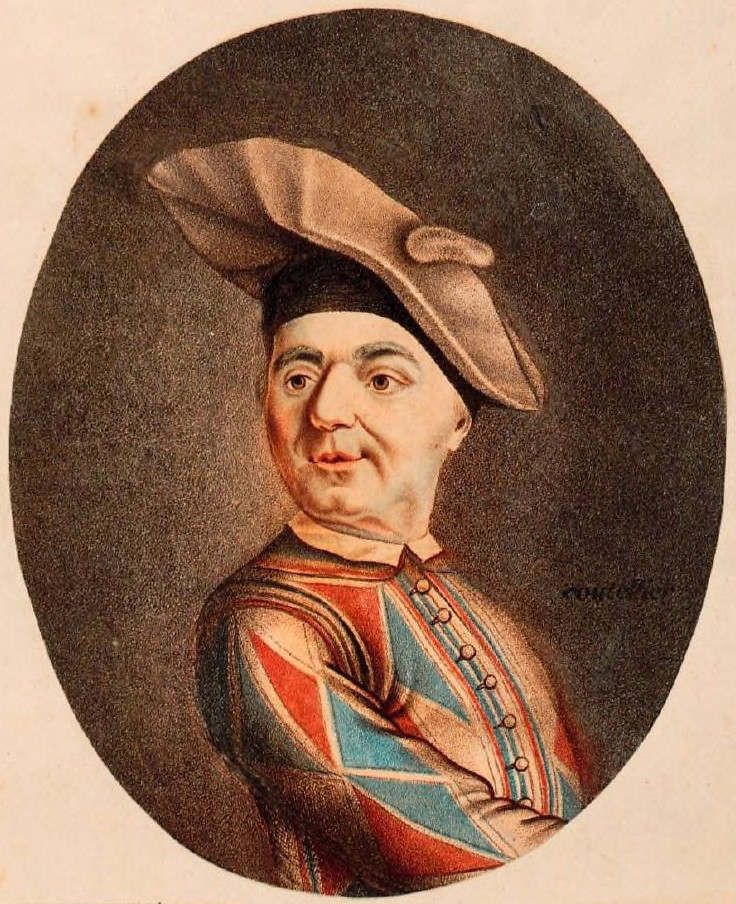
Carlo Bertinazzi born 2 December

- January 3 – Richard Gridley, American Revolutionary soldier (d. 1796)
- January 4
  - Margravine Sophie Christine of Brandenburg-Bayreuth (d. 1739)
  - Giovanni Battista Pergolesi, Italian composer (d. 1736)
- January 5 – Friedrich Wilhelm Riedt, German flautist (d. 1783)
- January 16 – Sir William Ashburnham, 4th Baronet, Church of England priest and baronet (d. 1797)
- January 23 – Jakob Langebek, Danish historian (d. 1775)
- January 28 – Jean-Martial Frédou, French portrait painter (d. 1795)
- January 30
  - Septimus Robinson, British Army officer who became Gentleman Usher of the Black Rod (d. 1765)
  - Raimondo di Sangro, Italian nobleman (d. 1771)
- February 1 – Konrad Ernst Ackermann, German actor (d. 1771)
- February 12 – John Affleck, British Tory politician (d. 1776)
- February 15 – King Louis XV of France, Bourbon monarch who ruled as King of France and of Navarre 1715–1774 (d. 1774)
- February 21 – Willem van Haren, Dutch nobleman and poet (d. 1768)
- February 28 – Peter Delmé, wealthy English merchant and landowner (d. 1770)
- March 3 – Johann Sigismund Mörl, German theologian (d. 1791)
- March 4 – Aert Schouman, painter from the Dutch Republic (d. 1792)
- March 7 – Casto Innocenzio Ansaldi, Italian professor (d. 1780)
- March 10 – Christian Ditlev Reventlow, Danish Privy Councillor (d. 1775)
- March 15 – George Forbes, 4th Earl of Granard, Irish soldier and politician (d. 1769)
- March 18 – Ezekiel Worthen, New Hampshire native who participated in the American Revolutionary War (d. 1793)
- March 19 – Otto Didrik Schack, 3rd Count of Schackenborg, Danish nobleman and enfeoffed count (d. 1741)
- March 26 – Louis Guillouet, comte d'Orvilliers (d. 1792)
- March 27 – Joseph Abaco, Italian violoncellist and composer (d. 1805)
- April 2 – Samuel White, lawyer in the Province of Massachusetts Bay (d. 1769)
- April 4
  - György Klimó, Bishop of Pécs and founder of the Klimo Library and printing press (d. 1777)
  - Edmund Lechmere, British politician (d. 1805)
- April 10 – George Charles Dyhern, Saxon general (d. 1759)
- April 12 – Caffarelli, Italian castrato and opera singer (d. 1783)
- April 13 – Jonathan Carver, colonial American military officer (d. 1780)
- April 15
  - Marie-Anne de Cupis de Camargo, French dancer (d. 1770)
  - William Cullen, Scottish physician and chemist (d. 1790)
- April 17 – Henry Erskine, 10th Earl of Buchan, British Freemason (d. 1767)
- April 18 – Friedrich Bogislav von Tauentzien, Prussian general during the wars of King Frederick the Great (d. 1791)
- April 20 – Jean-Joseph Sue, French surgeon and anatomist (d. 1792)
- April 23 – John Tempest Sr., landowner and Member of Parliament (d. 1776)
- April 24 – Louis-Philippe Mariauchau d'Esgly, eighth bishop of the diocese of Quebec (d. 1788)
- April 25 – James Ferguson, Scottish astronomer (d. 1776)
- April 26 – Thomas Reid, Scottish philosopher (d. 1796)
- April 30 – Johann Kaspar Basselet von La Rosée, Bavarian general (d. 1795)
- May 6 – Richard Bland, American planter and statesman from Virginia (d. 1776)
- May 8
  - Charles Hope-Weir, Scottish politician (d. 1791)
  - Peter Anton von Verschaffelt, Flemish sculptor and architect (d. 1793)
- May 10 – François Bonamy, French botanist and physician (d. 1786)
- May 14 – Adolf Frederick, King of Sweden (d. 1771)
- May 16
  - Joan Gideon Loten, Governor of Zeylan, Fellow of the Royal Society (d. 1789)
  - Lorenzo Peracino, Italian painter active near Novara in northern Italy (d. 1789)
  - William Talbot, 1st Earl Talbot, English politician (d. 1782)
- May 18
  - Johann II Bernoulli, youngest of the three sons of Johann Bernoulli (d. 1790)
  - Vere Poulett, 3rd Earl Poulett (d. 1788)
  - Charles Willing, Philadelphia merchant (d. 1754)
- May 21 – Thomas Thynne, 2nd Viscount Weymouth (d. 1751)
- May 23 – François Gaspard Adam, French rococo sculptor (d. 1761)
- June 6 – Andrea Scacciati, Italian painter (b. 1642)
- June 10 – James Short, Scottish mathematician and optician (d. 1768)
- June 14 – Peder Kofod Ancher, Danish jurist (d. 1788)
- June 15 – Robert Oliver, priest (d. 1784)
- June 18 – Klaas Annink, notorious Dutch serial killer in Twente, Netherlands (d. 1775)
- July 4 – Thomas Hay, 9th Earl of Kinnoull (d. 1787)
- July 10 – Robert O'Callaghan, politician (d. 1761)
- July 11 – Sir John Morgan, 4th Baronet (d. 1767)
- July 18 – John Cruger Jr., speaker of the Province of New York assembly, Mayor of New York City (d. 1791)
- July 21 – Paul Möhring, German physician and scientist (d. 1792)
- July 23 – Jonathan Belcher, British-American lawyer (d. 1776)
- July 26 – John Lambton, senior officer in the British Army and MP (d. 1794)
- July 31 – Jacob Houblon, British landowner and Tory politician (d. 1770)
- August 6 – Frances Jones, colonist (d. 1785)
- August 10 – Princess Luise Dorothea of Saxe-Meiningen, member of German royalty (d. 1767)
- August 13
  - Margrave Frederick of Brandenburg-Schwedt, second son of Margrave Albert Frederick (d. 1741)
  - William Heberden, English physician (d. 1801)
  - Andrés Fernández Pacheco, 10th Duke of Escalona, Spanish aristocrat and academician (d. 1746)
- August 14 – Corbyn Morris, English official and economic writer (d. 1779)
- August 18 – Landon Carter, American planter from Lancaster County (d. 1778)
- August 19 – Charles Wyndham, 2nd Earl of Egremont (d. 1763)
- August 20 – Thomas Simpson, British mathematician (d. 1761)
- August 22 – Johann August Nahl, German sculptor and plasterer (d. 1781)
- August 27
  - Joseph Tiefenthaler, Jesuit missionary, one of the earliest European geographers to write about India (d. 1785)
  - Giuseppe Vasi, Italian engraver and architect (d. 1782)
- August 28 – Pierre Augustin Boissier de Sauvages, French naturalist, researcher in provençal dialect and encyclopédist (d. 1795)
- September 3 – Abraham Trembley, Genevan naturalist (d. 1784)
- September 9 – Friedrich Rudolf von Rothenburg, lieutenant general (d. 1751)
- September 11 – Louis Frederick of Saxe-Hildburghausen, Prince, General Field Marshal in the Bavarian army (d. 1759)
- September 22 – Georg Matthias Bose, famous early experimenter in electrostatics (d. 1761)
- September 24 – William Bull II, landowner (d. 1791)
- September 25
  - Augustin Ehrensvärd, Swedish military officer (d. 1772)
  - Charles-François Racot de Grandval, French actor and playwright (d. 1784)
- September 29
  - Johann Andreas Michael Nagel, German Hebrew scholar and Orientalist (d. 1788)
  - Pompilio Maria Pirrotti, Italian Roman Catholic priest and a professed member of the Piarists (d. 1766)
- September 30 – John Russell, 4th Duke of Bedford, British statesman (d. 1771)
- October 3 – Jean Robert Tronchin, Attorney General, member of the State Council of Geneva (d. 1793)
- October 7 – François-Josué de La Corne Dubreuil, officer in the colonial regular troops of New France and (d. 1759)
- October 11 – Christophe-Gabriel Allegrain, French sculptor who tempered a neoclassical style with Rococo charm and softness (d. 1795)
- October 12 – Jonathan Trumbull, Governor of the Colony and the state of Connecticut (d. 1785)
- October 13 – Alban Butler, English Roman Catholic priest and hagiographer (d. 1773)
- October 16 – András Hadik, Austro-Hungarian general (d. 1790)
- October 19 – Franz Karl Ludwig von Wied zu Neuwied, lieutenant general in Frederick the Great's army (d. 1765)
- October 22 – Anne-Marie du Boccage, French writer (d. 1802)
- October 26 – Lukrecija Bogašinović Budmani, Serb-catholic poet (d. 1784)
- October 31 – Ole Tidemand, Norwegian theologian and priest (d. 1778)
- November 2 – Andrea Negroni, Italian Cardinal who was Cardinal-Deacon of the titular Church of Santi Vito (d. 1789)
- November 4 – Charles-François Tarieu de La Naudière, officer in the colonial regular troops and seigneur in Lower Canada (d. 1776)
- November 6 – David McGregore, Presbyterian minister and member of the Colonial America Christian Clergy (d. 1777)
- November 8 – Sarah Fielding, English author, sister of the novelist Henry Fielding (d. 1768)
- November 10 – Adam Gottlob Moltke, Danish statesman (d. 1792)
- November 13 – Charles Simon Favart, French playwright (d. 1792)
- November 19
  - Johann Wilhelm Hoffmann, German historian (d. 1739)
  - Giovanni Andrea Lazzarini, Italian painter (d. 1801)
- November 21
  - Johann Ernst Gotzkowsky, Prussian merchant with a successful trade in trinkets (d. 1775)
  - Paolo Renier, Venetian statesman (d. 1789)
- November 22 – Wilhelm Friedemann Bach, German composer (d. 1784)
- November 27 – Robert Lowth, English bishop and grammarian (d. 1787)
- November 28 – Henry Hyde, Viscount Cornbury (d. 1753)
- December 1 – Michele Marieschi, Italian painter and engraver (d. 1744)
- December 2 – Carlo Bertinazzi, Italian actor and writer (d. 1783)
- December 5 – Nicolò Porta, Italian painter of the late-Baroque period (d. 1784)
- December 15 – Francesco Zahra, Maltese painter (d. 1773)
- December 24 – Tibout Regters, portrait painter from the Northern Netherlands (d. 1768)
- December 28 – Henrik Teofilus Scheffer, Swedish chemist (d. 1759)
- date unknown – Ahmad bin Said al-Busaidi, first ruler of the Al Said Dynasty of Oman (d. 1783)

1711

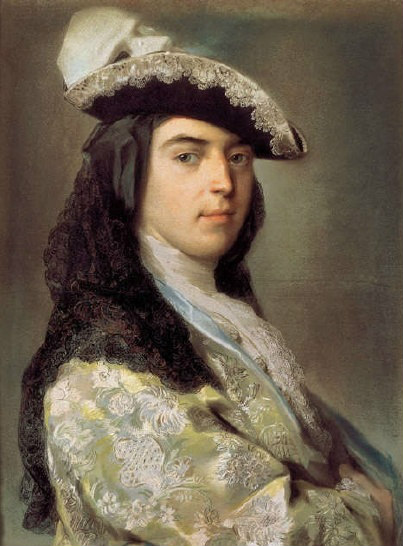
Charles Sackville, 2nd Duke of Dorset born 6 February

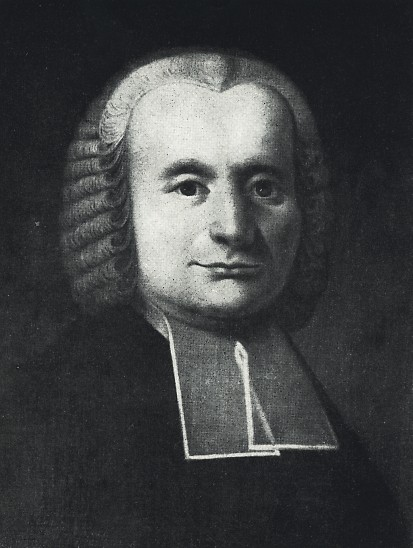
Samuel Gotthold Lange born 22 March

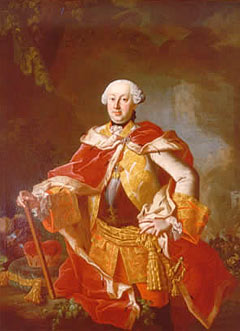
Paul II Anton, Prince Esterházy born 22 April

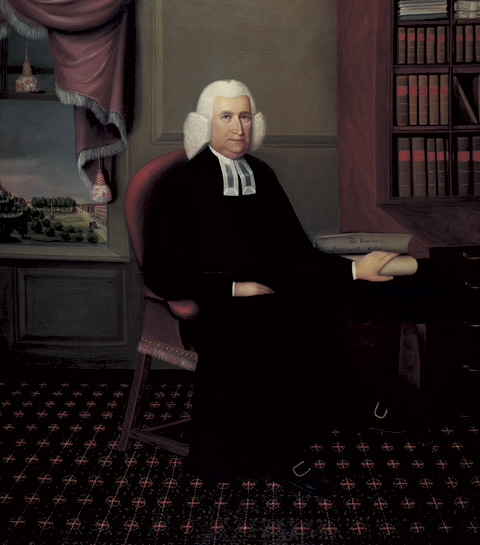
Eleazar Wheelock born 22 April

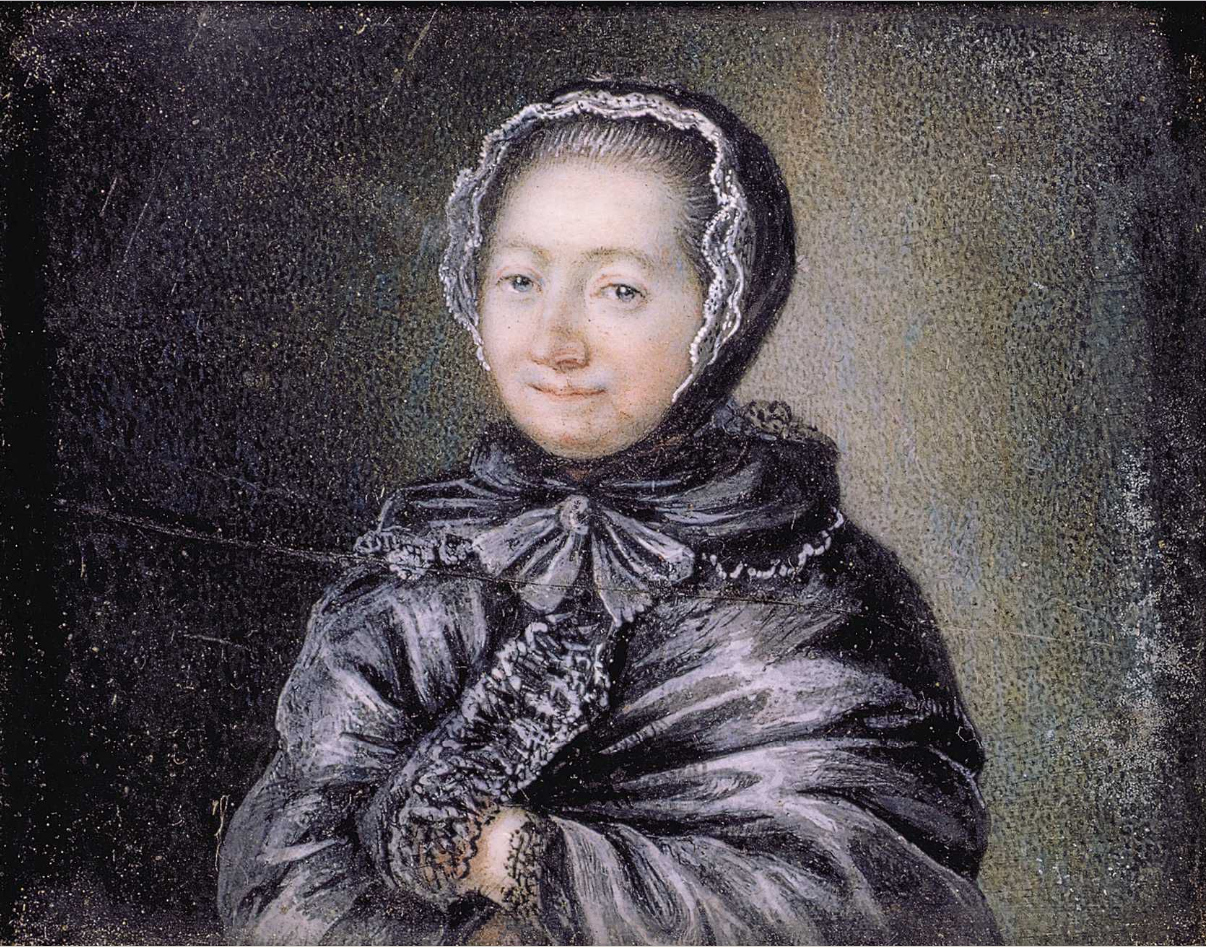
Jeanne-Marie Leprince de Beaumont born 26 April

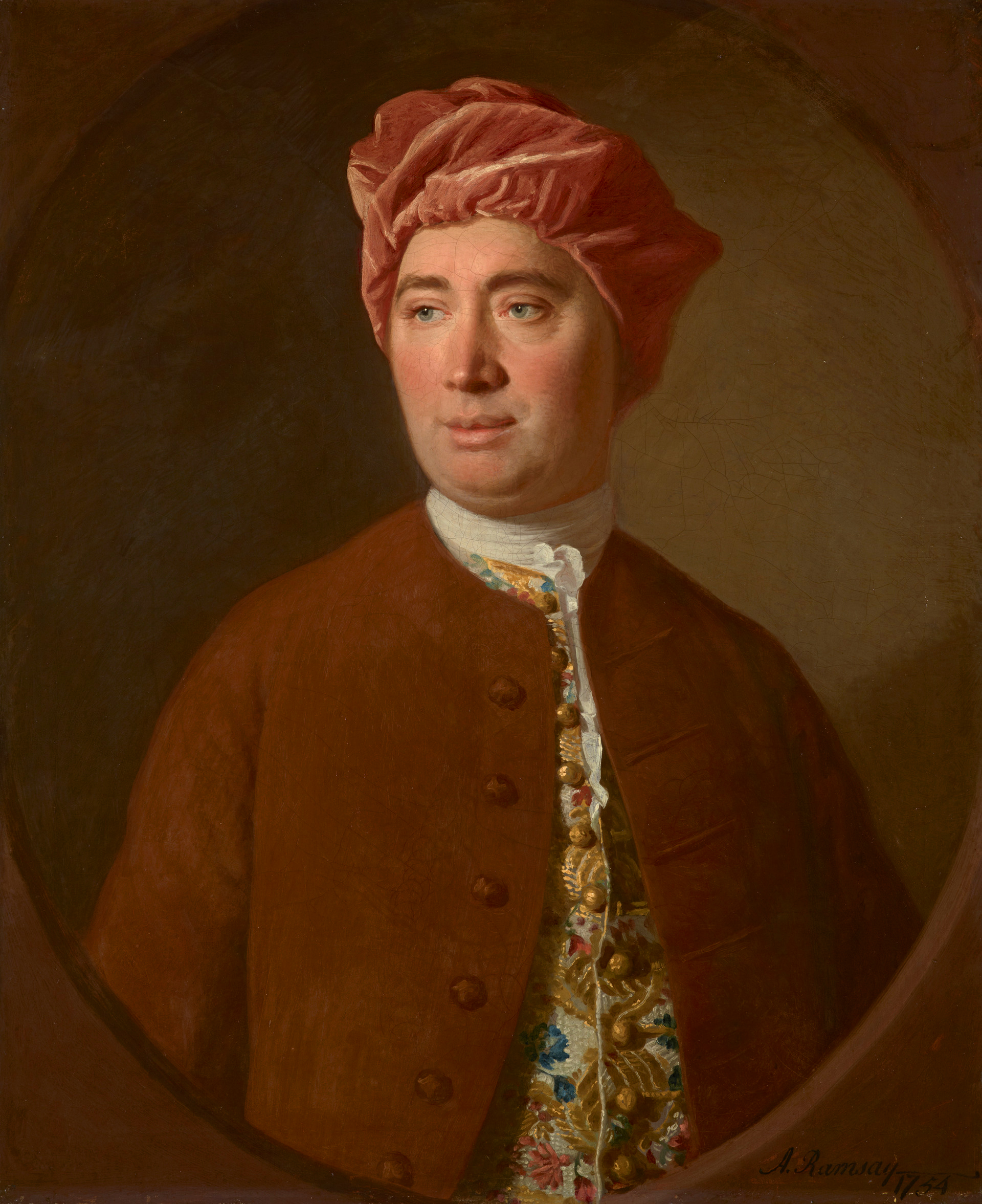
David Hume born 26 April

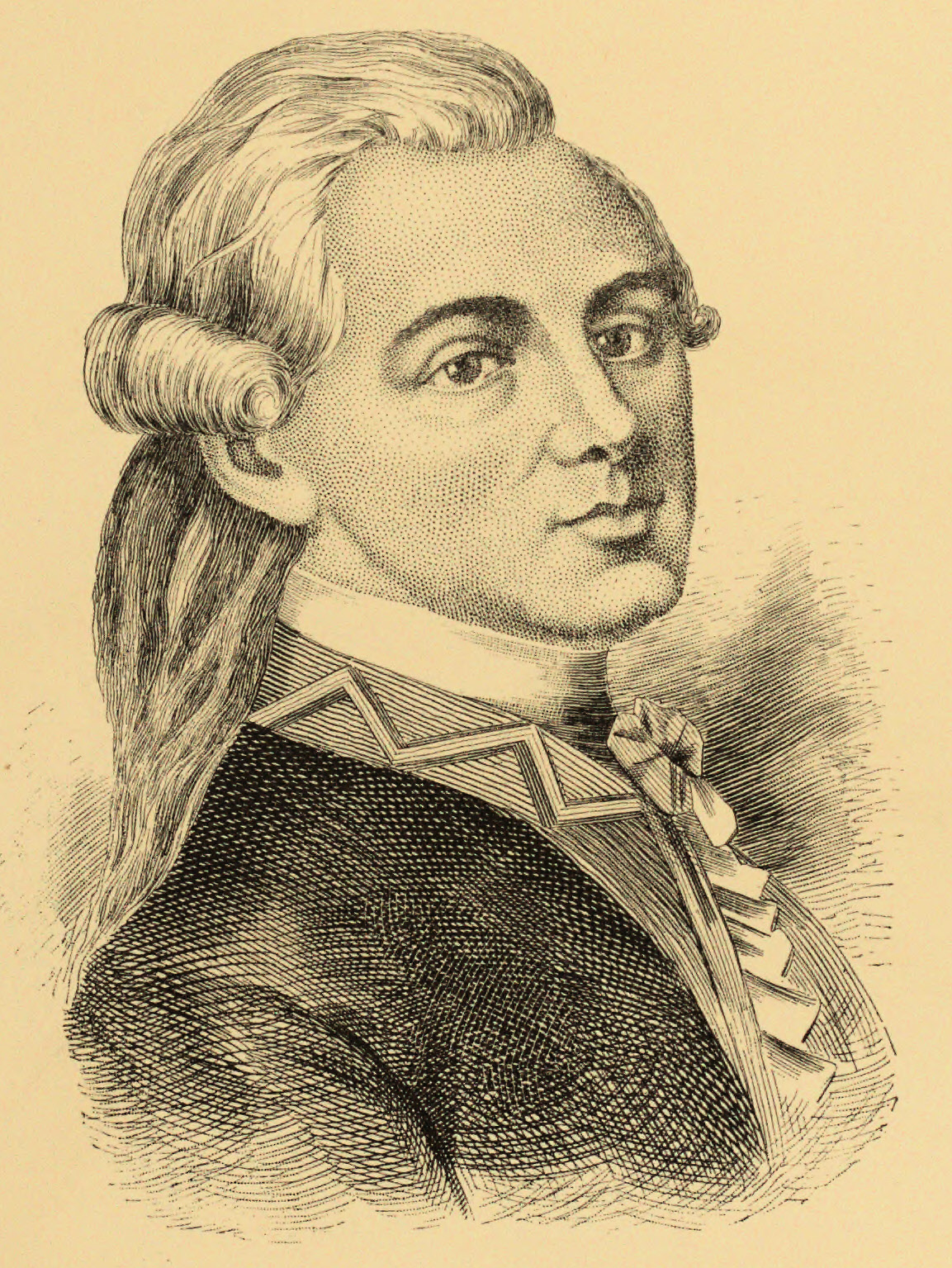
Daniel Liénard de Beaujeu born 19 August

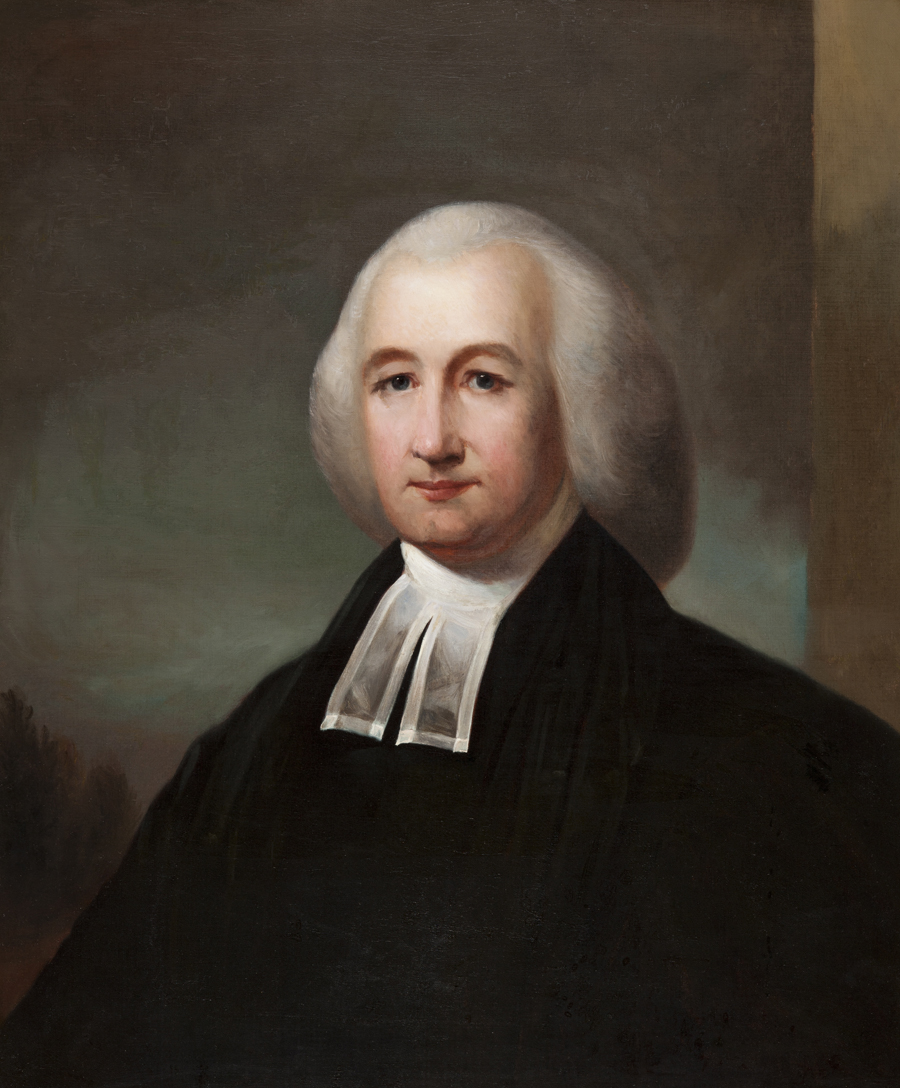
Henry Muhlenberg born 6 September

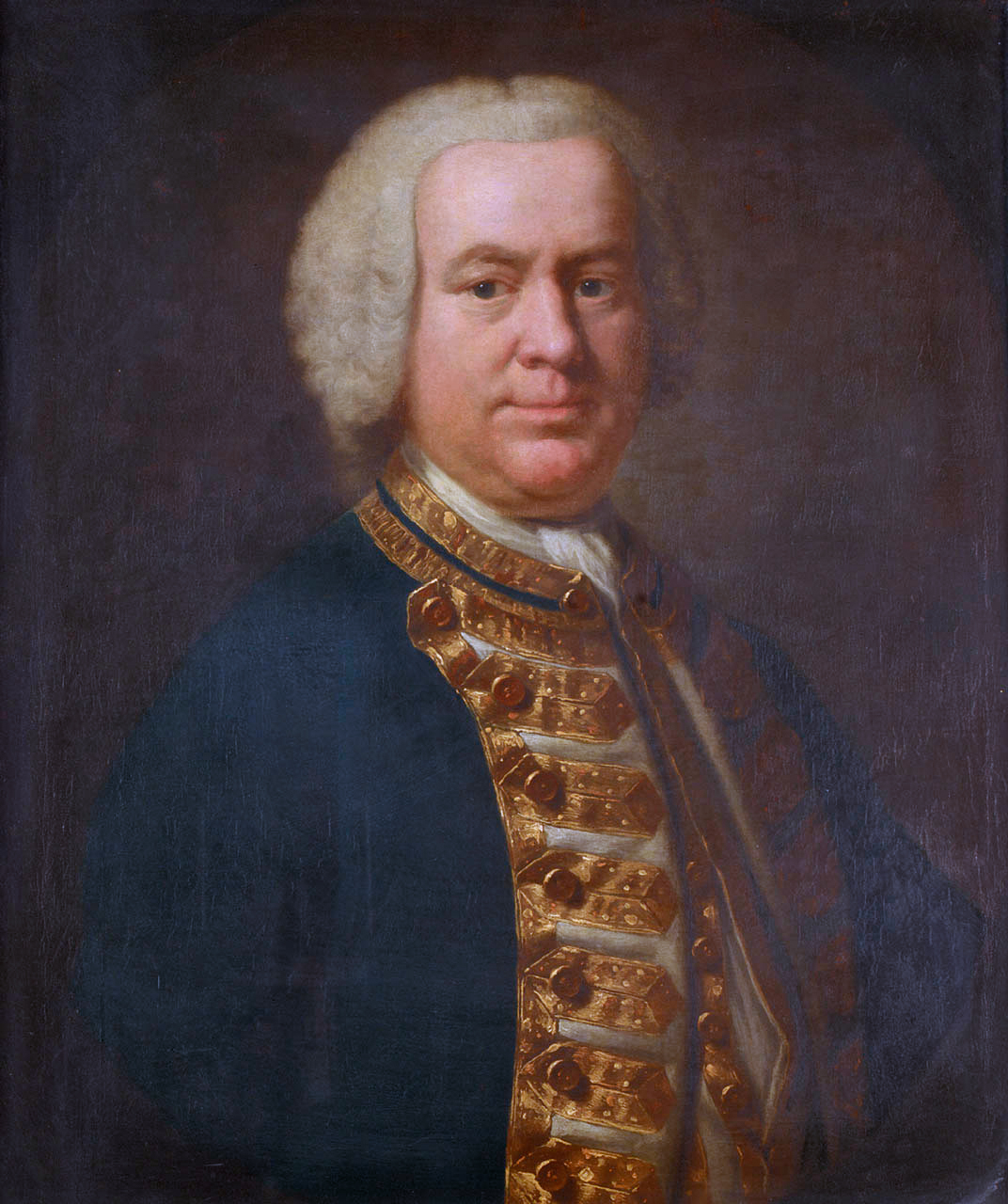
Charles Holmes (Royal Navy officer) born 19 September

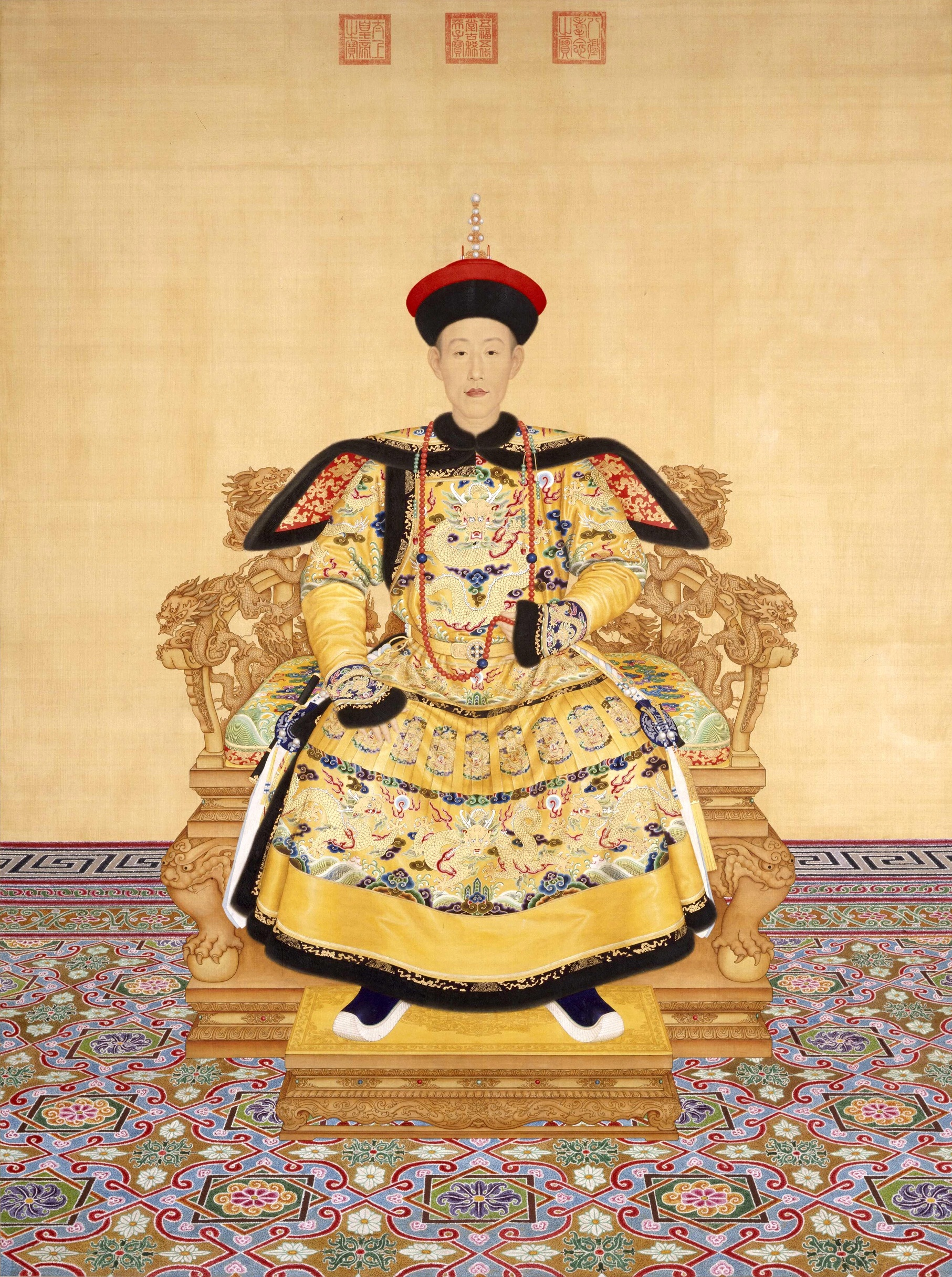
Qianlong Emperor born 25 September

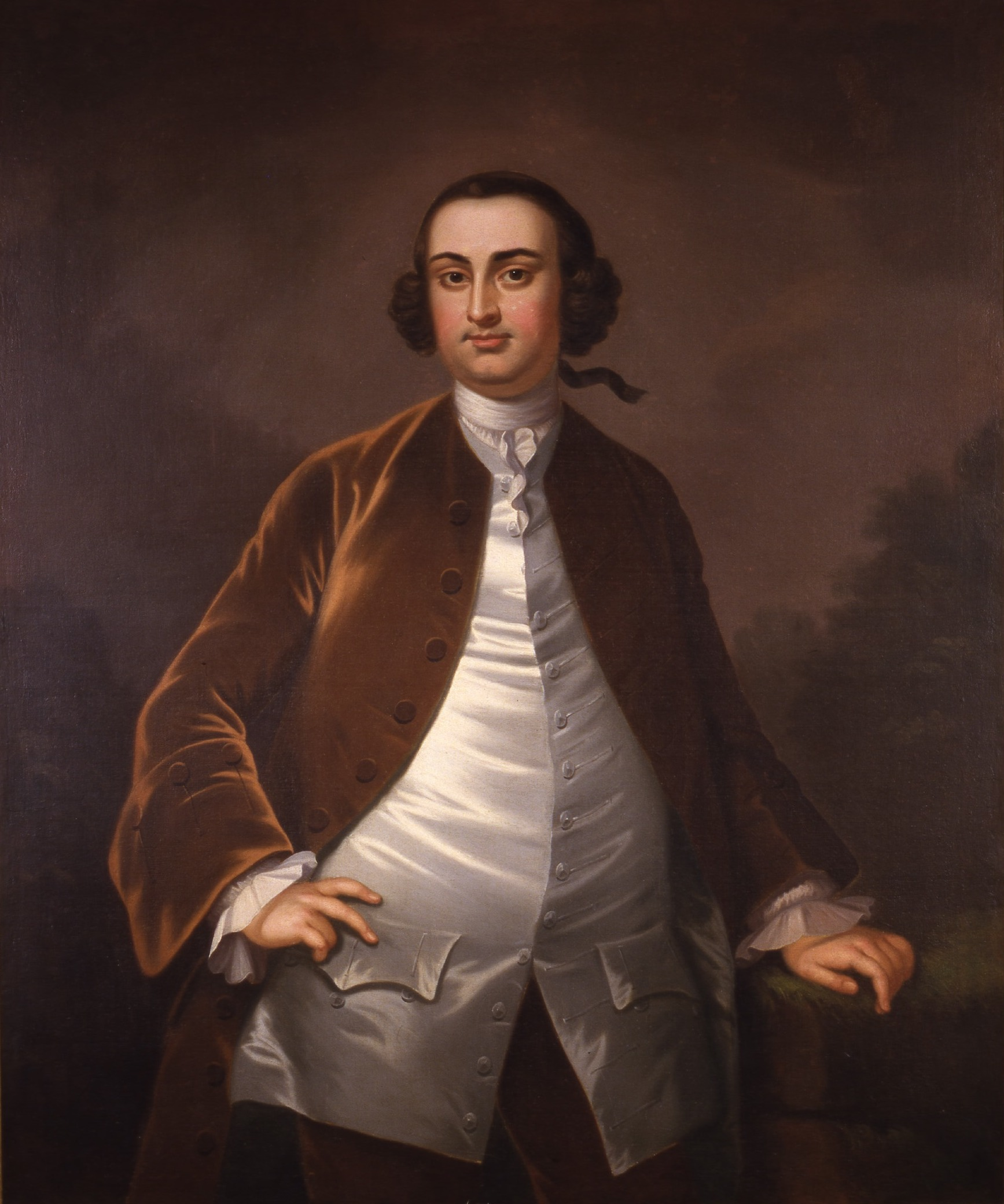
Daniel Parke Custis born 15 October

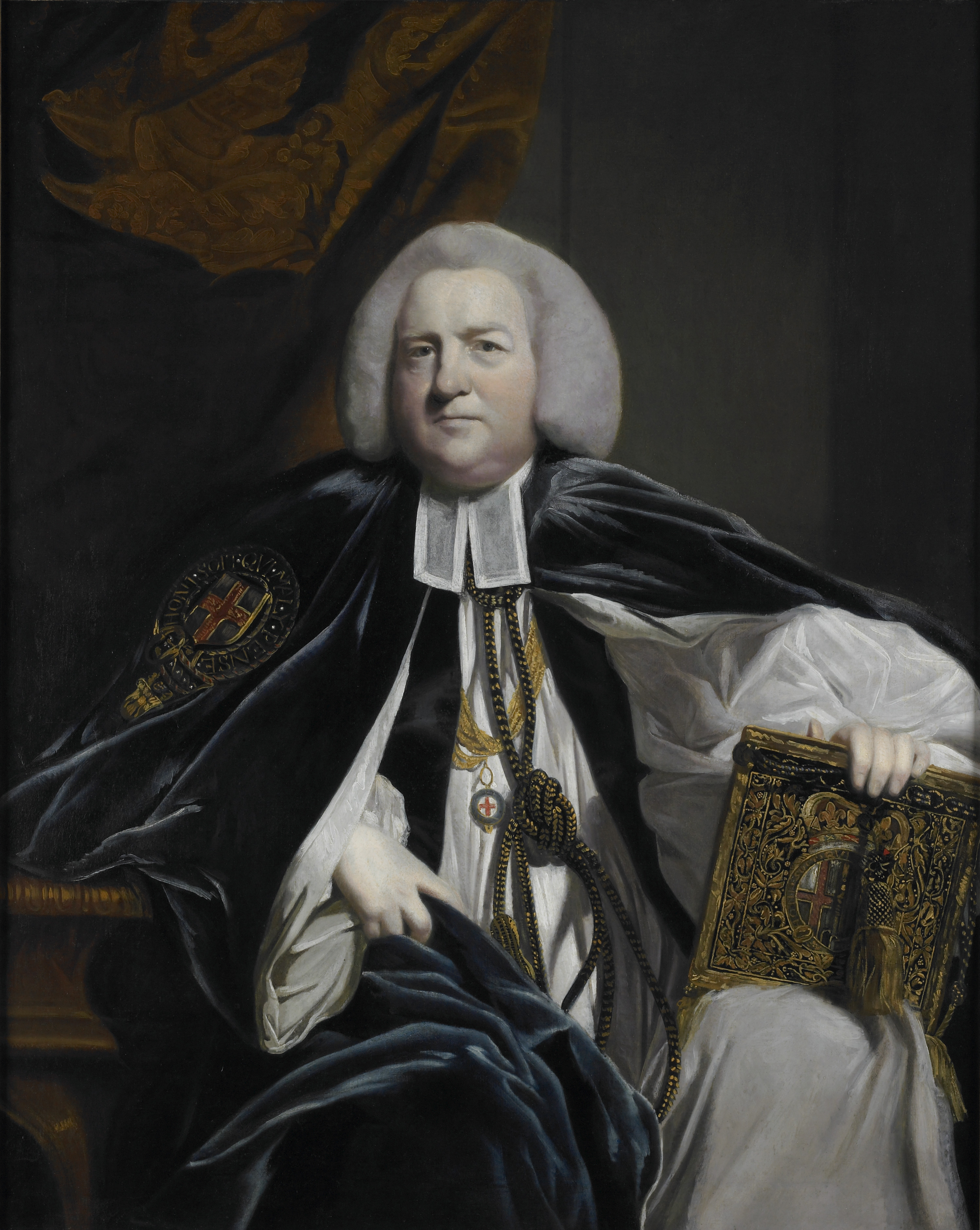
Robert Hay Drummond born 10 November

- January 1 – Baron Franz von der Trenck, Austrian noble (d. 1749)
- January 3
  - Charles Moss, British bishop of Bath and Wells (d. 1802)
  - Giuseppe Capece Zurlo, Italian cardinal who served as Archbishop of Naples (d. 1801)
- January 12 – Gaetano Latilla, Italian opera composer (d. 1788)
- January 15 – Sidonia Hedwig Zäunemann, German poet (d. 1740)
- January 22 – Johann Phillip Fabricius, German missionary (d. 1791)
- January 28 – Johan Hörner, Swedish-born Danish portrait painter (d. 1763)
- January 29 – Giuseppe Bonno, Austrian composer (d. 1788)
- January 30 – Abraham Roentgen, German Ébéniste (cabinetmaker) (d. 1793)
- February 2 – Wenzel Anton, Prince of Kaunitz-Rietberg, Austrian diplomat and chancellor (d. 1794)
- February 3 – Omar Ali Saifuddin I, Sultan of Brunei (d. 1795)
- February 4 – Józef Aleksander Jabłonowski, Polish prince (d. 1777)
- February 5 – Joseph Umstatt, Austrian composer of the early Classical era (d. 1762)
- February 6 – Charles Sackville, 2nd Duke of Dorset, English cricketer (d. 1769)
- February 9
  - Anthony Ashley Cooper, 4th Earl of Shaftesbury, England (d. 1771)
  - Luis Vicente de Velasco, Spanish officer and commander in the Royal Spanish Navy (d. 1762)
- February 10 – John Plumptre, British politician (d. 1791)
- February 13 – Domènec Terradellas, Spanish opera composer (d. 1751)
- February 14 – Alexandra Kurakina, daughter of Lieutenant-General and Senator Ivan Panin (d. 1786)
- February 23 – Louis de Brienne de Conflans d'Armentières, French general (d. 1774)
- February 25
  - Tokugawa Gorōta, Japanese daimyō (d. 1713)
  - John Perceval, 2nd Earl of Egmont, British politician with Irish connections (d. 1770)
- February 27
  - Gerrit de Graeff, member of the De Graeff family from the Dutch Golden Age (d. 1752)
  - Constantine Mavrocordatos, Prince of Wallachia and Moldavia (d. 1769)
- March 4 – Matthäus Stach, Moravian missionary in Greenland (d. 1787)
- March 5 – Carl Gustaf Pilo, Swedish-born artist and painter (d. 1793)
- March 11 – Joseph Leeson, 1st Earl of Milltown, Irish peer and politician (d. 1783)
- March 22 – Samuel Gotthold Lange, German poet (d. 1781)
- March 24 – William Brownrigg, doctor and scientist (d. 1800)
- April 2 – Job Baster, Dutch naturalist (d. 1775)
- April 3 – Hartwig Karl von Wartenberg, Royal Prussian major general (d. 1757)
- April 10 – John Gambold, British bishop (d. 1771)
- April 13 – John Mitchell, colonial American physician and botanist (d. 1768)
- April 14 – Lord John Murray, British general and politician (d. 1787)
- April 22
  - Paul II Anton, Prince Esterházy (d. 1762)
  - Eleazar Wheelock, American President of Dartmouth College (d. 1779)
- April 26
  - Jeanne-Marie Leprince de Beaumont, French writer (d. 1780)
  - David Hume, Scottish philosopher, economist, and historian (d. 1776)
- May 1 – Richard Clarke, Massachusetts merchant (d. 1795)
- May 7 – Johann Friedrich Gräfe, German civil servant and an amateur composer (d. 1787)
- May 9 – Sir Mark Sykes, 1st Baronet, priest in the Church of England (d. 1783)
- May 10 – Frederick, Margrave of Brandenburg-Bayreuth, member of the House of Hohenzollern (d. 1763)
- May 12 – Abraham Darby II, English ironmaster (d. 1763)
- May 17 – Agustín de Jáuregui, Spanish colonial governor (d. 1784)
- May 18 – Roger Joseph Boscovich, Croatian-Italian priest and mathematician (d. 1787)
- May 22 – Guillaume du Tillot, French politician (d. 1774)
- May 23 – Ulla Tessin, Swedish courtier (d. 1768)
- May 31 – Johann Heinrich Samuel Formey, German writer (d. 1797)
- June 6 – Jean-Baptiste Coye, Occitan language writer (d. 1771)
- June 7 – François Jacquier, French Franciscan mathematician and physicist (d. 1788)
- June 8 – Charles Morris, Canadian judge (d. 1781)
- June 12 – Louis Legrand, French Sulpician priest and theologian (d. 1780)
- June 13 – Sir Richard Glyn, 1st Baronet, of Ewell, British banker and politician (d. 1773)
- June 16 – François-Louis de Pourroy de Lauberivière, fifth bishop of the diocese of Quebec (1739–1740) (d. 1740)
- June 19 – Jacob Bremer, Swedish merchant and industrialist (d. 1785)
- June 23 – Giovanni Battista Guadagnini, Italian luthier (d. 1786)
- July 10 – Princess Amelia of Great Britain, Second daughter of George II of Great Britain (d. 1786)
- July 11 – Anne Poulett, British politician (d. 1785)
- July 18 – John Olmius, 1st Baron Waltham, of Ireland (d. 1762)
- July 22 – Georg Wilhelm Richmann, German physicist (d. 1753)
- July 24 – Richard FitzWilliam, 6th Viscount FitzWilliam (d. 1776)
- July 26
  - Lorenz Christoph Mizler, German music historian, polymath (d. 1778)
  - Jacques Hardouin-Mansart de Sagonne, French architect (d. 1778)
- July 27 – Christian Ancher, Norwegian merchant (d. 1765)
- July 29 – Claude-Adrien Nonnotte, French writer (d. 1793)
- August 19
  - Daniel Liénard de Beaujeu, Canadian officer during King George's War and the Seven Years' War (d. 1755)
  - Edward Boscawen, British Royal Navy admiral (d. 1761)
  - Gabriel de Solages, French soldier and industrialist (d. 1799)
- August 21 – Bernardo de Hoyos, Beatified Spanish priest (d. 1735)
- September 1 – William IV, Prince of Orange, first hereditary stadtholder of the Netherlands (d. 1751)
- September 2 – Noël Hallé, French painter (d. 1781)
- September 5 – Johann Nathanael Lieberkühn, German physician (d. 1756)
- September 6 – Henry Muhlenberg, Lutheran clergyman and missionary (d. 1787)
- September 8 – Flavio Chigi, Italian Catholic cardinal (d. 1771)
- September 9 – Thomas Hutchinson, historian and last civilian Governor of the Province of Massachusetts Bay (d. 1780)
- September 11 – Alexandre Guy Pingré, Catholic priest and scientist (d. 1796)
- September 14 – Michele Foschini, Italian painter (d. 1770)
- September 15 – Heinrich IX, Count Reuss of Köstritz, Count of Reuss-Köstritz and Minister of Prussia (d. 1780)
- September 17 – John Zephaniah Holwell, British surgeon (d. 1798)
- September 18 – Ignaz Holzbauer, composer of symphonies (d. 1783)
- September 19 – Charles Holmes, Rear admiral in the British Navy during the Seven Years' War (d. 1761)
- September 20
  - Ignazio Cirri, Italian organist and composer in the 18th century (d. 1787)
  - Frederick August I, Duke of Oldenburg (d. 1785)
- September 22 – Thomas Wright, English astronomer (d. 1786)
- September 23 – Louis Nicolas Victor de Félix d'Ollières, Marshal of France (d. 1775)
- September 25 – Qianlong Emperor, sixth Emperor of the Qing dynasty in China (d. 1799)
- September 26 – Richard Grenville-Temple, 2nd Earl Temple, British politician and first Lord of the Admiralty (d. 1779)
- September 28 – Joseph Richardson Sr., American silversmith (d. 1784)
- October 8 – Kumara Swamy Desikar, Indian philosopher (d. 1810)
- October 9 – James Grimston, 2nd Viscount Grimston, British peer and Member of Parliament (d. 1773)
- October 14 – John Smith, British astronomer (d. 1795)
- October 15
  - William Cooke, English cleric and academic (d. 1797)
  - Daniel Parke Custis, American planter (d. 1757)
  - Elisabeth Therese of Lorraine, Sardinian queen consort (d. 1741)
- October 17 – Jupiter Hammon, American writer (d. 1806)
- October 20 – Timothy Ruggles, American colonial politician (d. 1795)
- October 21 – Armand-Jérôme Bignon, French lawyer (d. 1772)
- October 31 – Laura Bassi, Italian physicist and academic (d. 1778)
- November 1 – Marcus Fredrik Bang, Norwegian bishop (d. 1789)
- November 5 – Kitty Clive, British actor (d. 1785)
- November 10 – Robert Hay Drummond, Archbishop of York (d. 1776)
- November 11 – Stepan Krasheninnikov, Russian scientist (d. 1755)
- November 18 – Franz Töpsl, German historian and Augustinian Canon Regular (d. 1796)
- November 19
  - John Berrien, farmer and merchant from Rocky Hill (d. 1772)
  - Mikhail Lomonosov, Russian polymath (d. 1765)
- November 20 – Niclas Gustaf Duncan, Swedish post official and spy (d. 1771)
- November 21 – Samuel Morris, merchant and Patriot in colonial and revolutionary-era Philadelphia (d. 1782)
- November 27 – Gerard Joan Vreeland, 28th Governor of Ceylon during the Dutch period in Ceylon (d. 1752)
- November 30 – Ebenezer Kinnersley, American scientist (d. 1778)
- December 4 – Barbara of Portugal, infanta of Portugal and later Queen of Ferdinand VI of Spain (d. 1758)
- December 21 – Thomas Whitmore, British Whig politician and MP (d. 1773)
- December 23 – Jacob Fortling, German-Danish sculptor (d. 1761)
- December 25 – Jean-Joseph de Mondonville, French composer and violinist (d. 1772)
- December 26 – Maria Menshikova, daughter of Aleksandr Danilovich Menshikov (d. 1729)
- December 28 – Samuel Egerton, British landowner and politician (d. 1780)
- Full Date Unknown – Mariot Arbuthnot, British admiral during the American War for Independence (d. 1794)
  - Susanna Passavant, Jeweller and toy designer (d. 1790)

1712

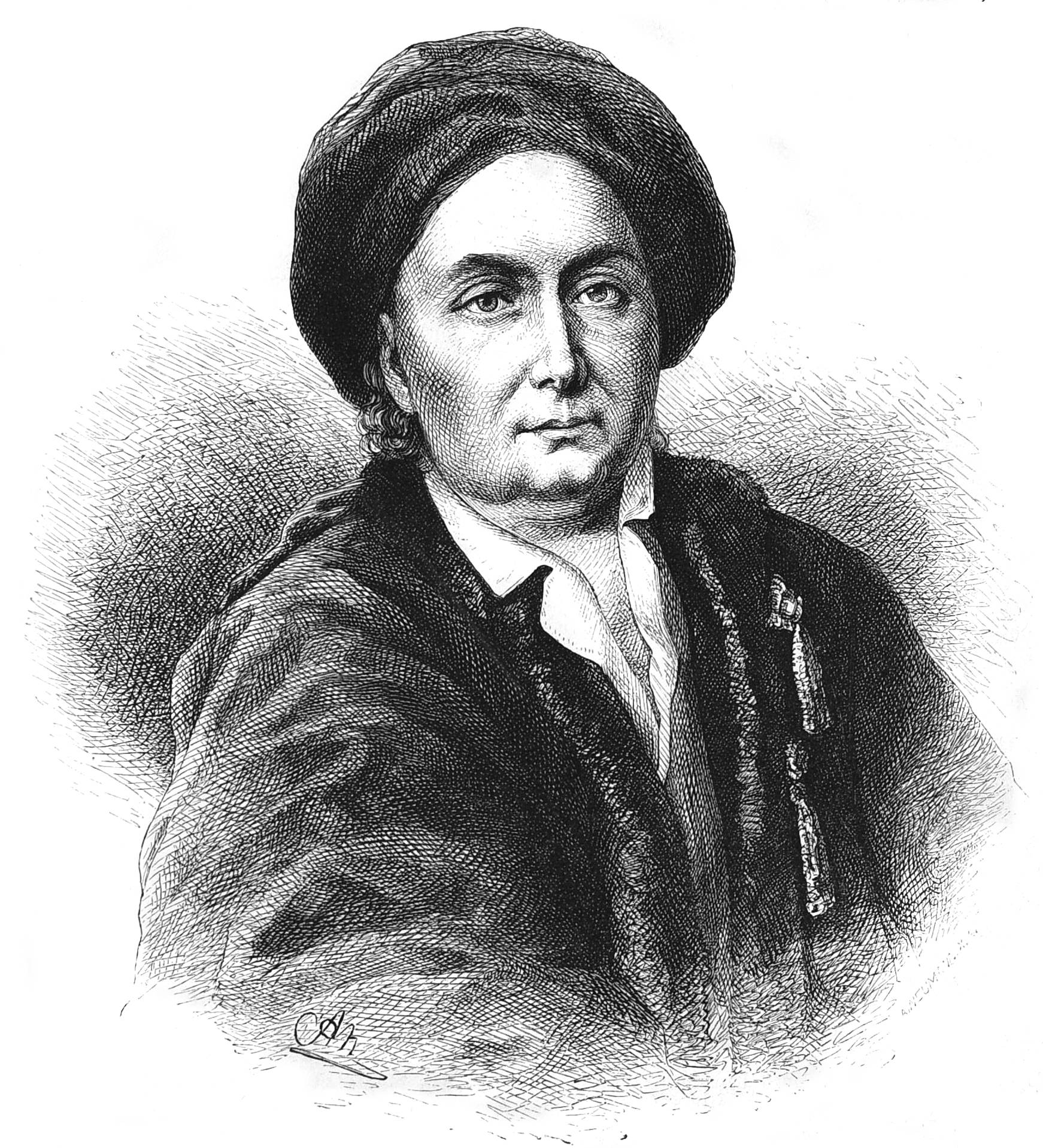
Ludwig van Beethoven (1712–1773) born 5 January

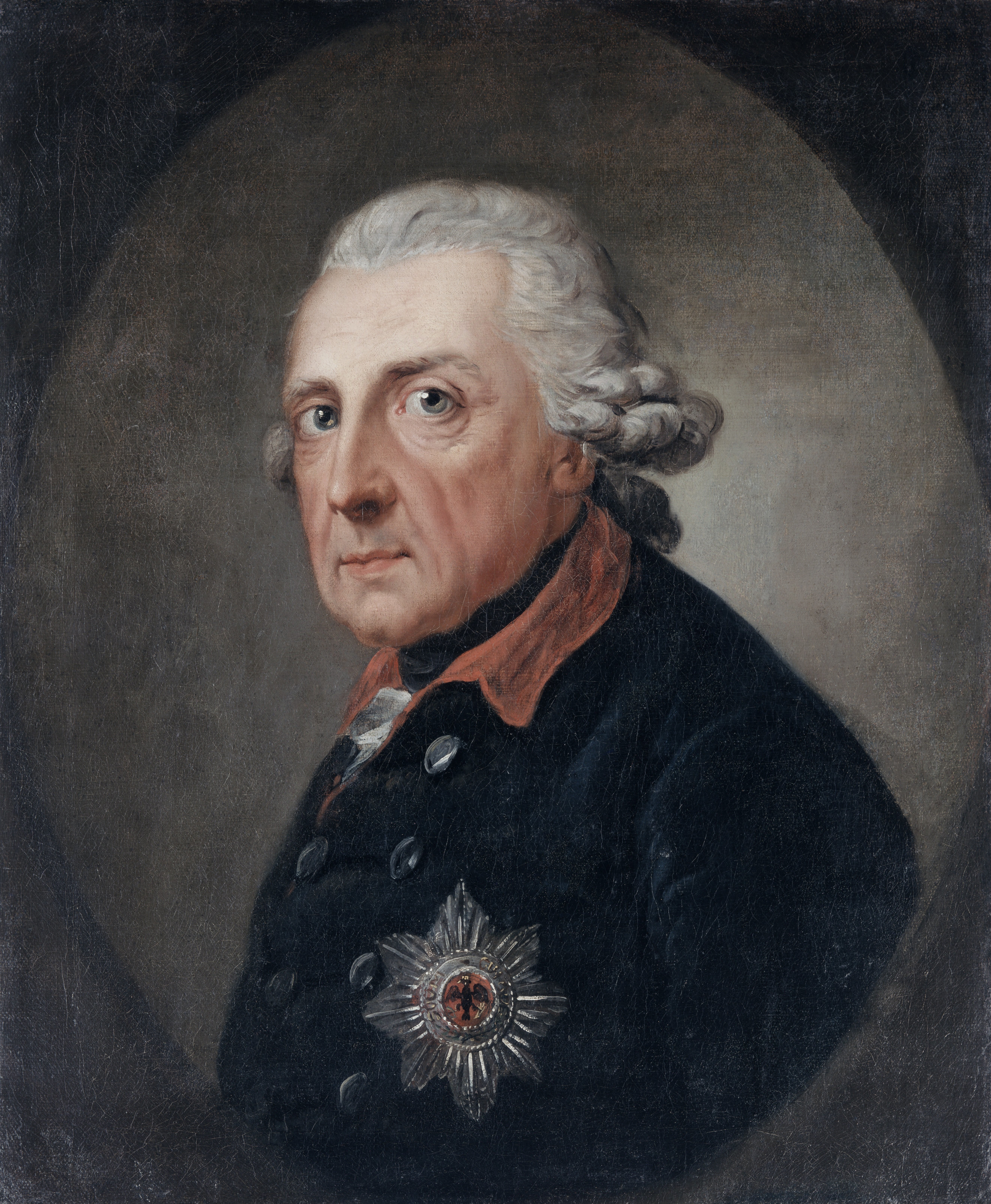
Frederick the Great born 24 January

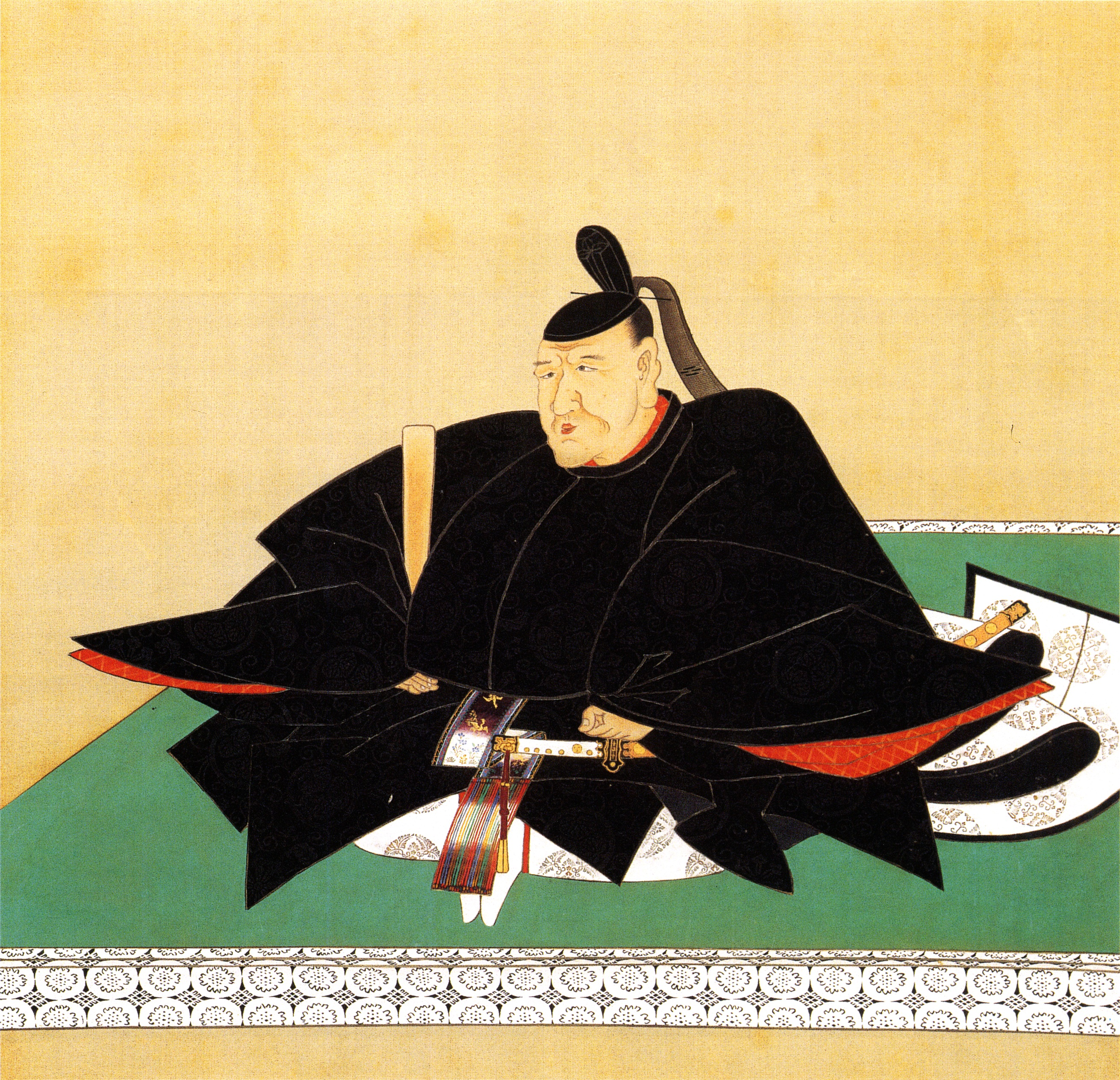
Tokugawa Ieshige born 28 January

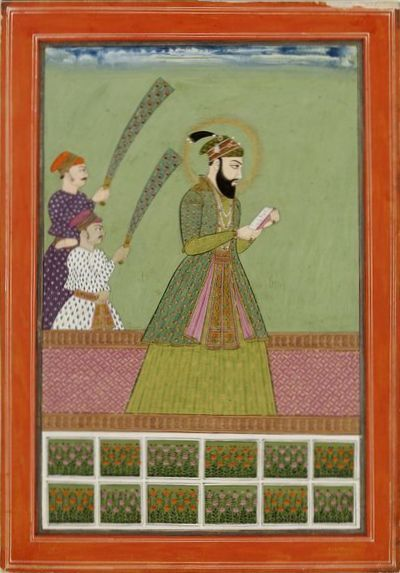
Nasir Jung born 26 February

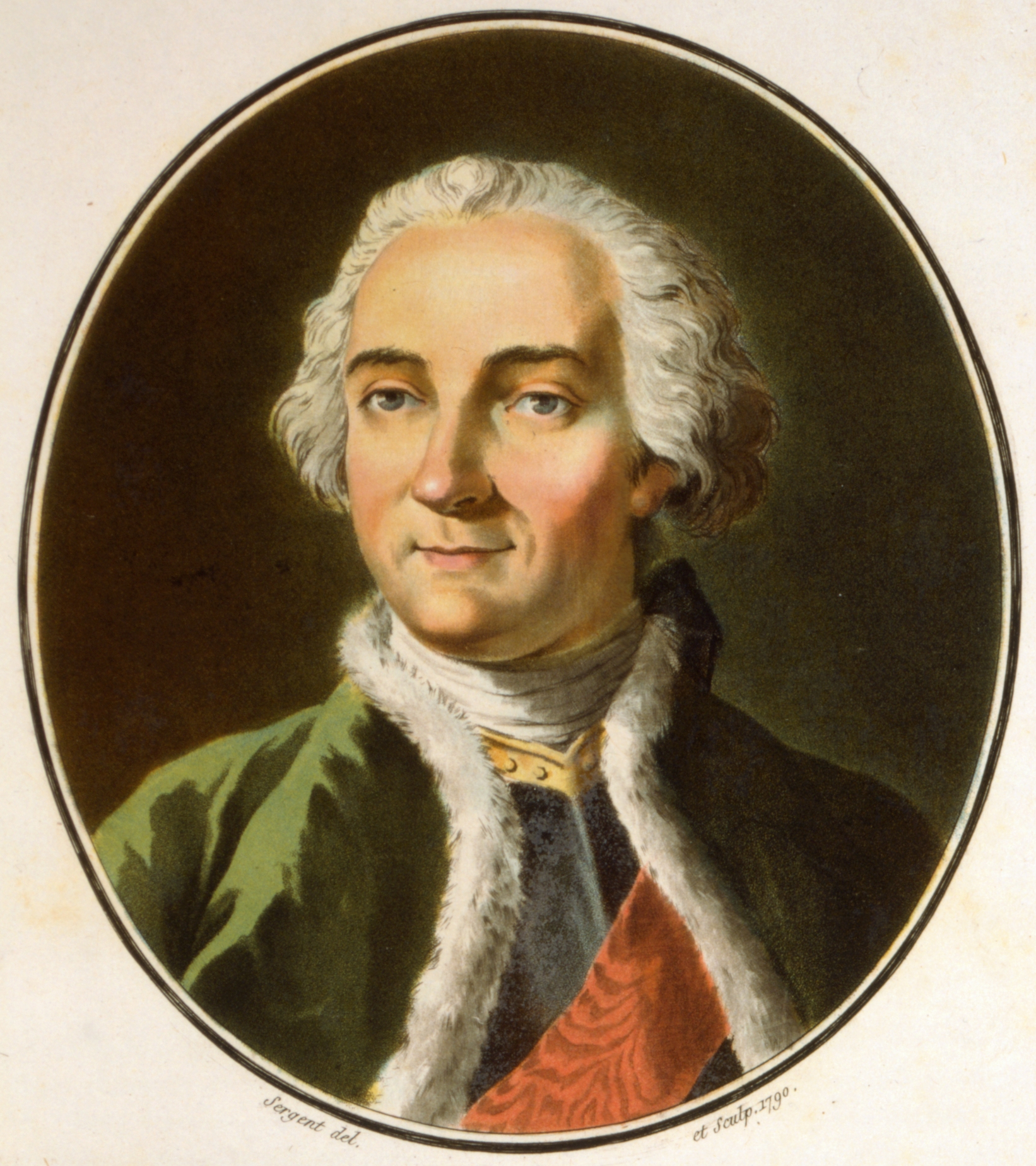
Louis-Joseph de Montcalm born 28 February

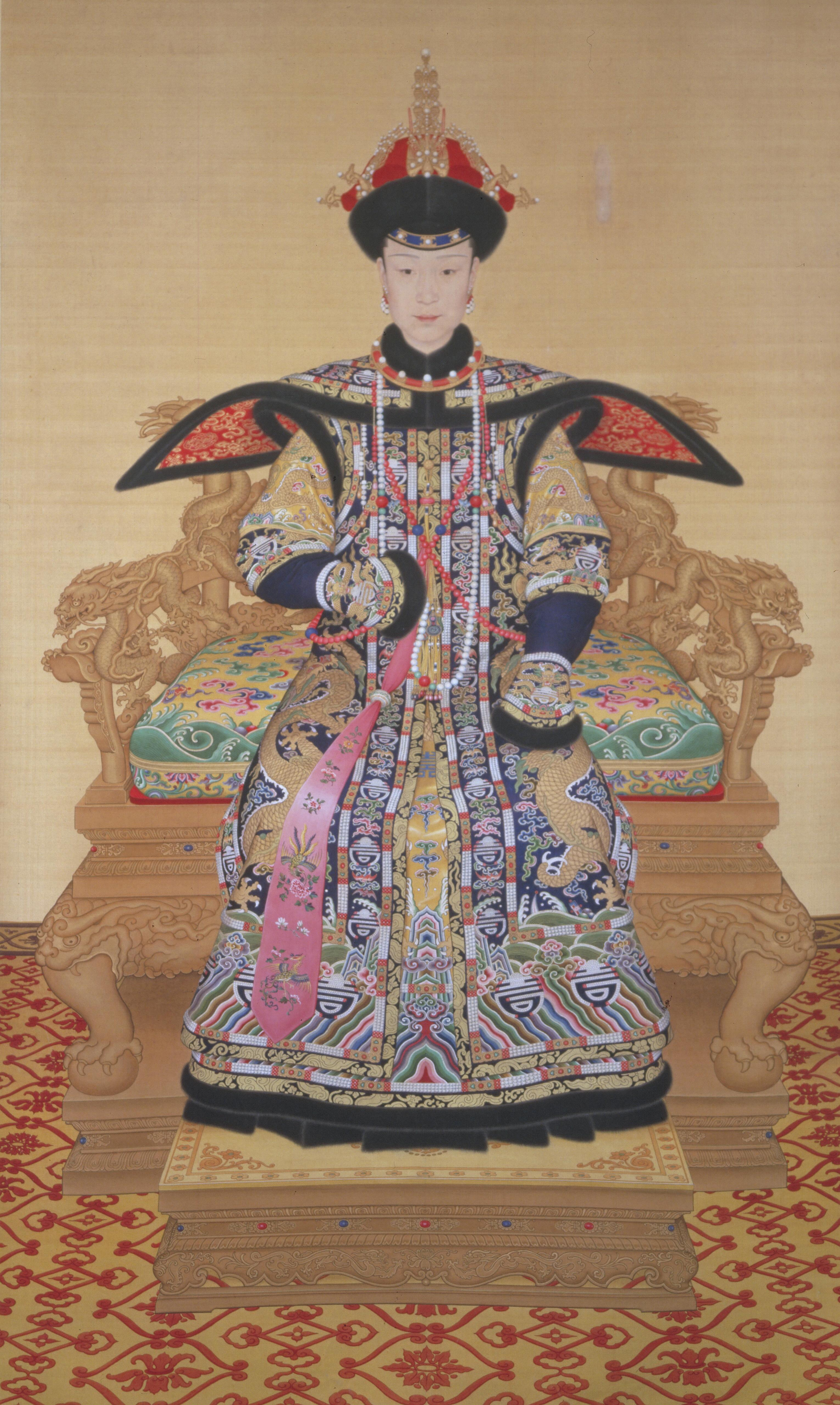
Empress Xiaoxianchun born 28 March

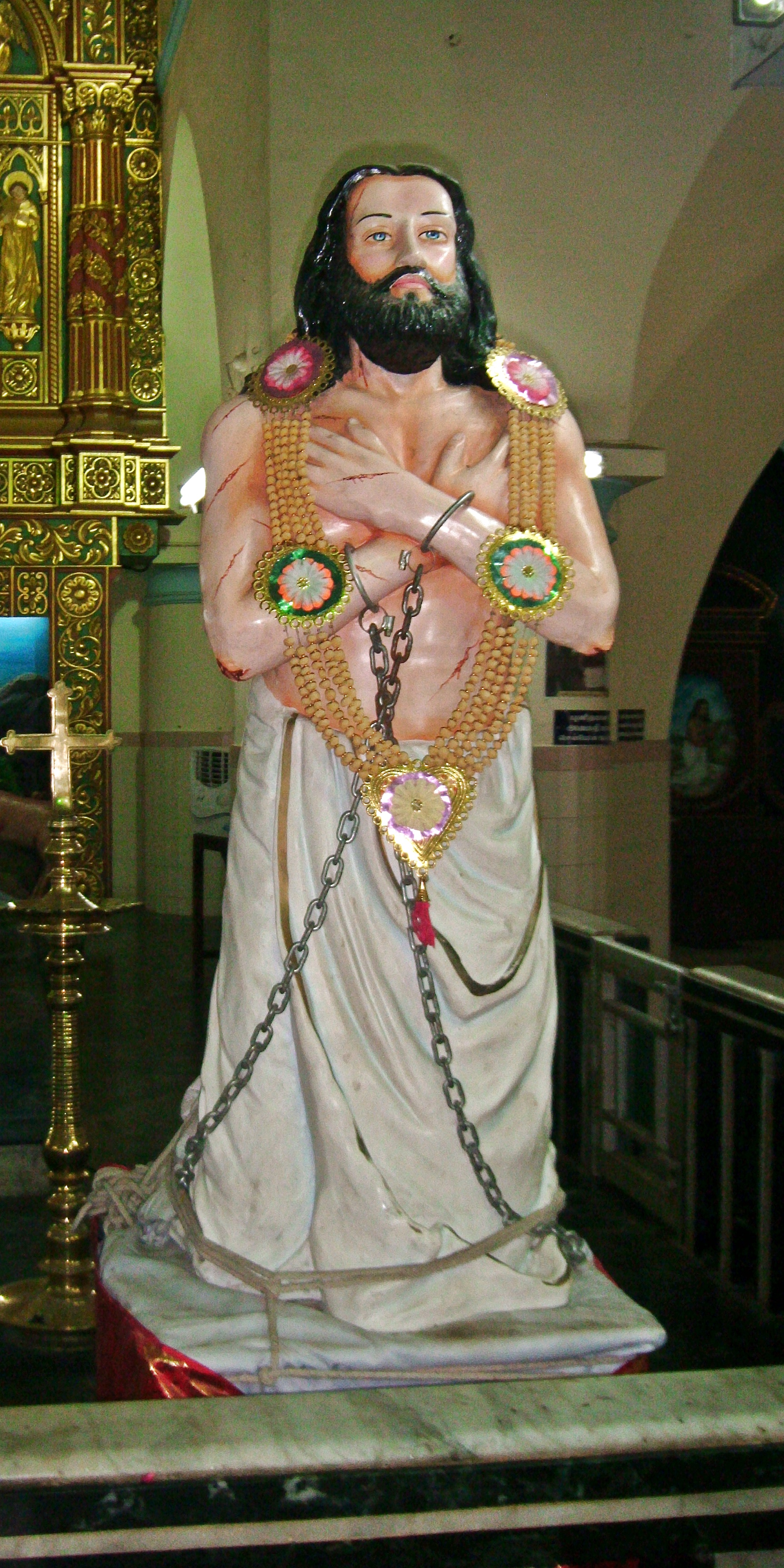
Devasahayam Pillai born 23 April

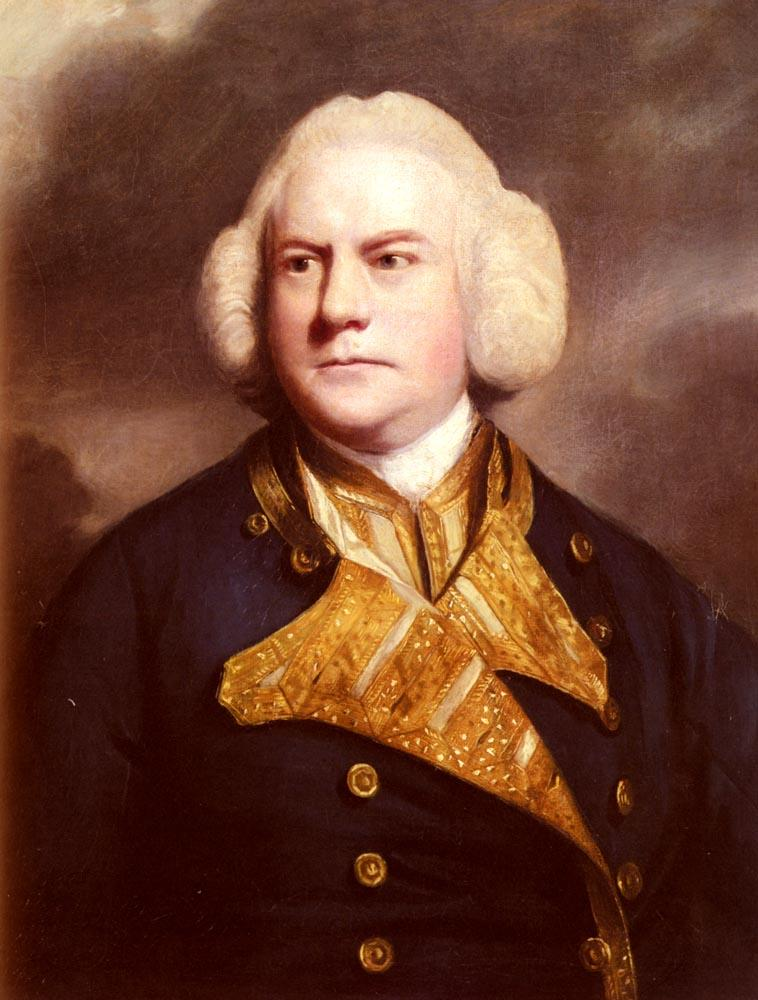
Thomas Cotes (Royal Navy officer) born 4 June

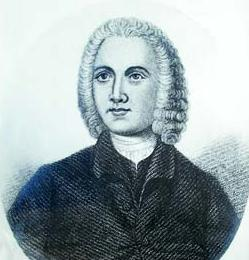
Benjamin Ingham born 11 June

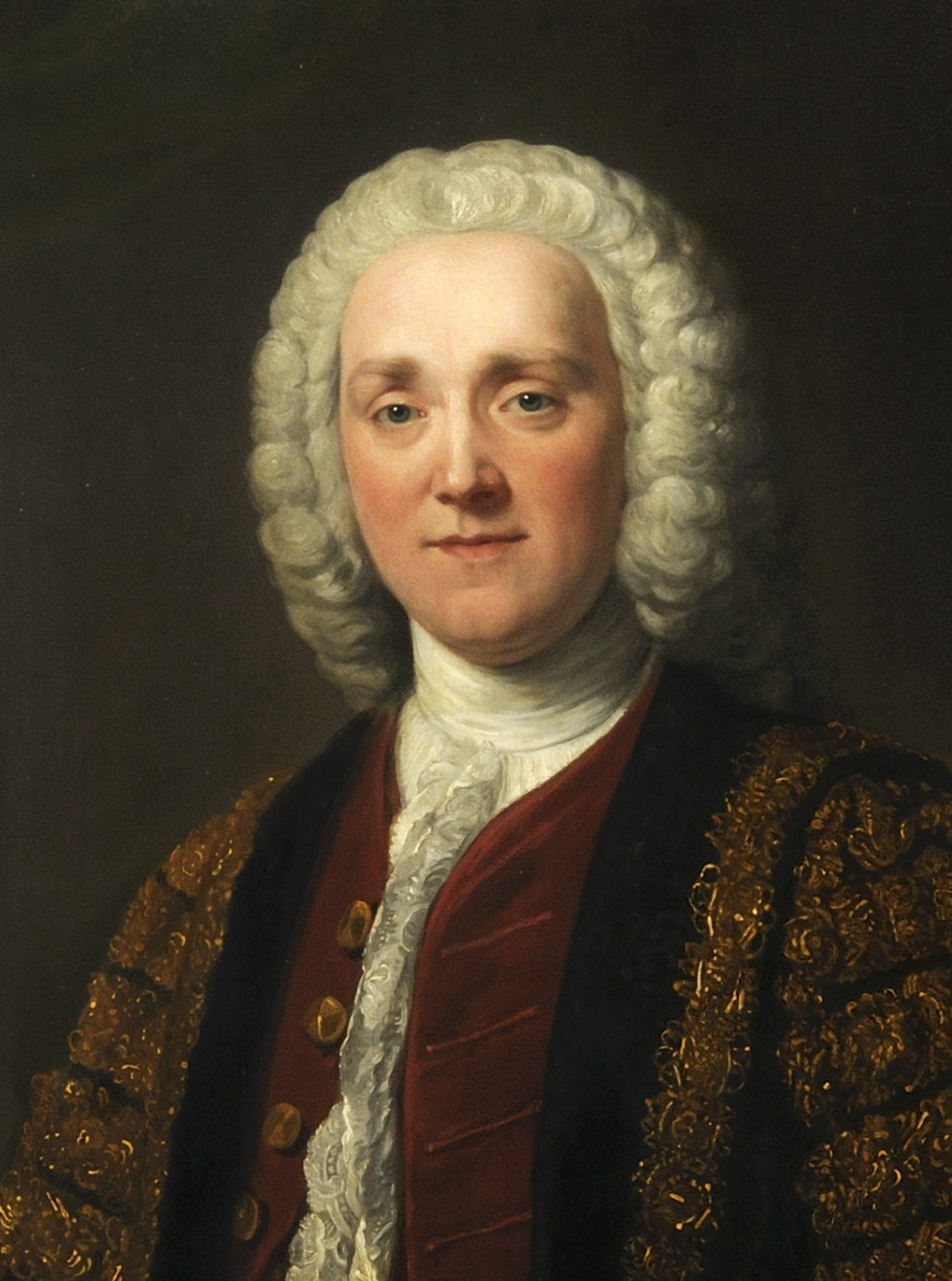
George Grenville born 14 October

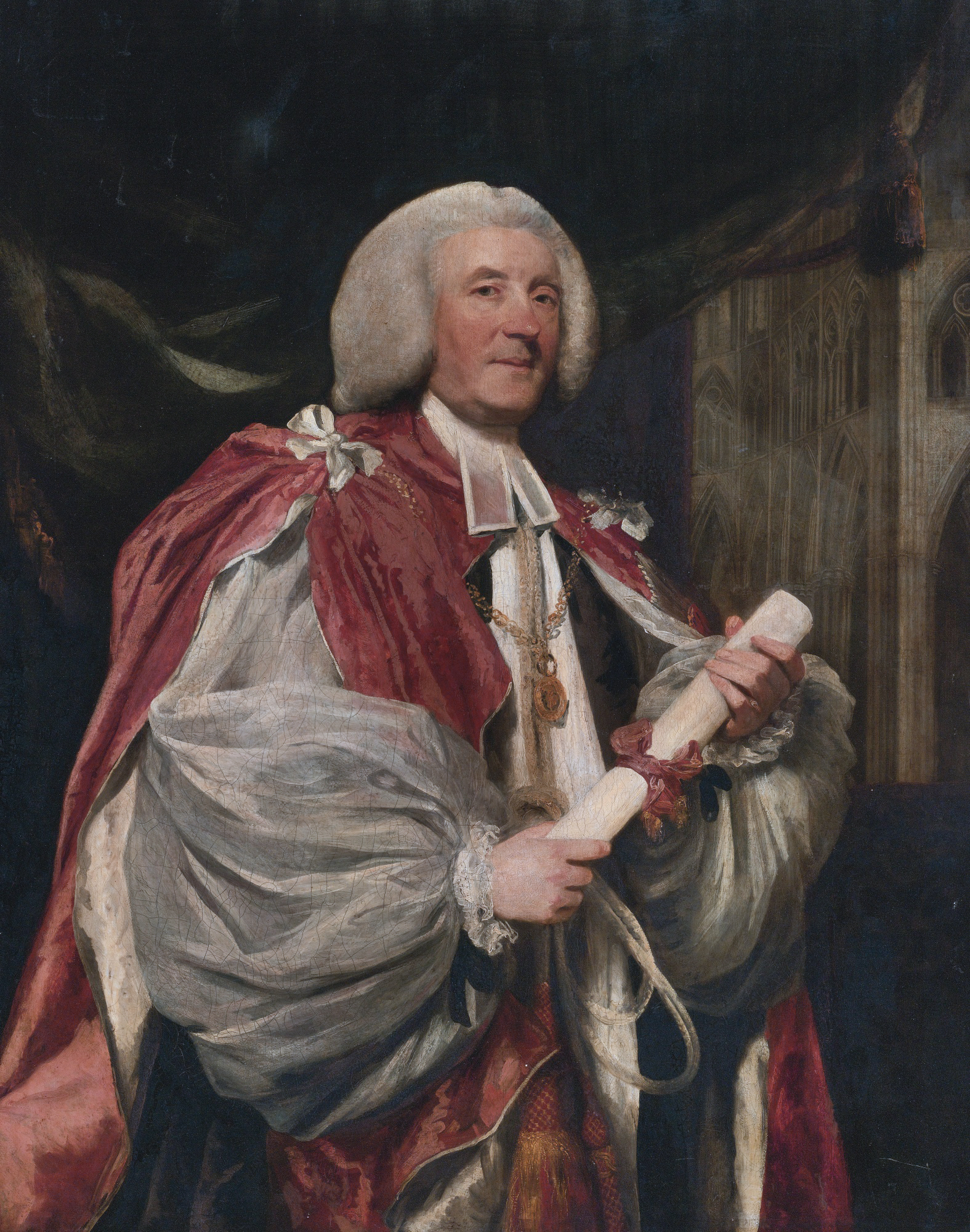
John Thomas (bishop of Rochester) born 14 October

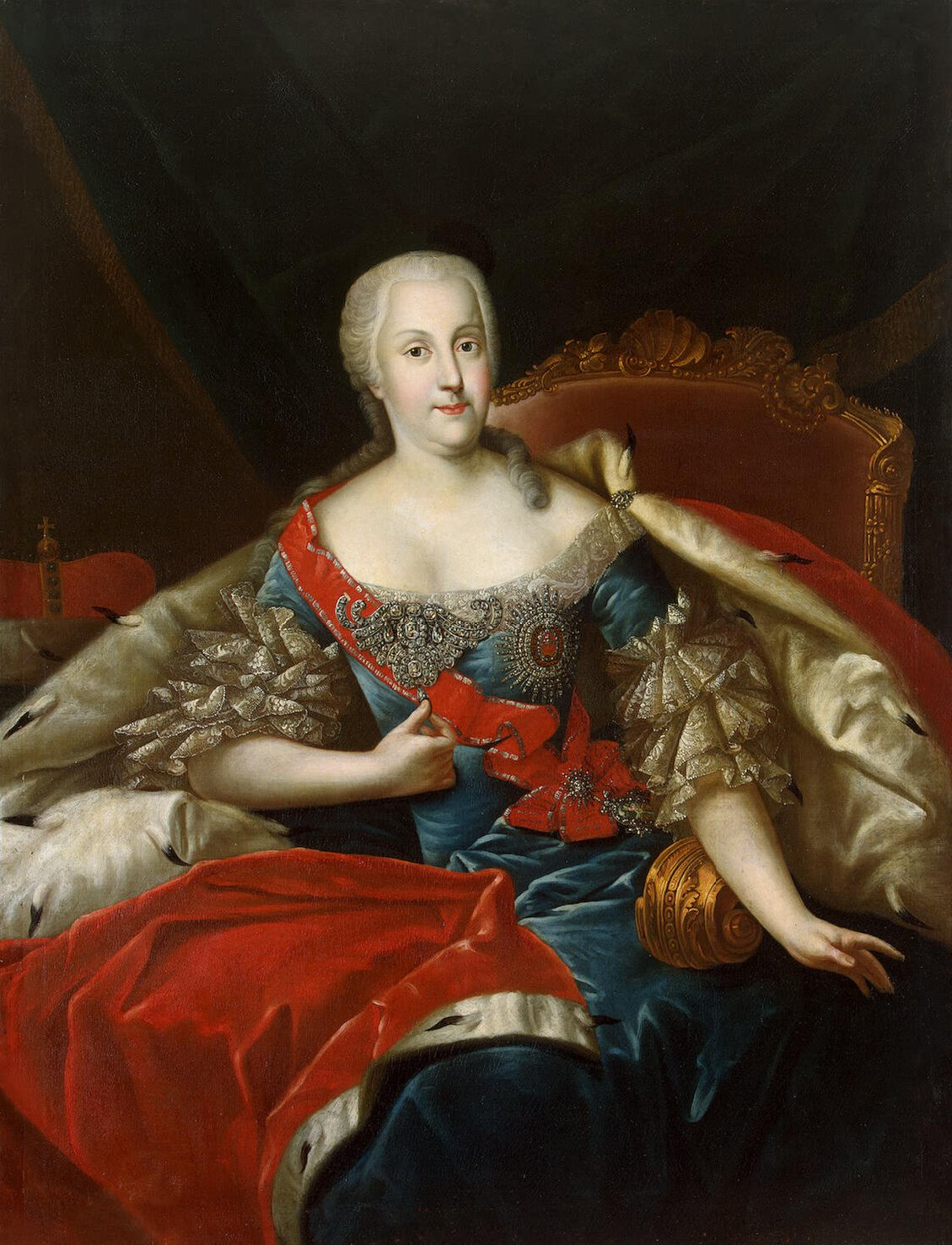
Joanna Elisabeth of Holstein-Gottorp born 24 October

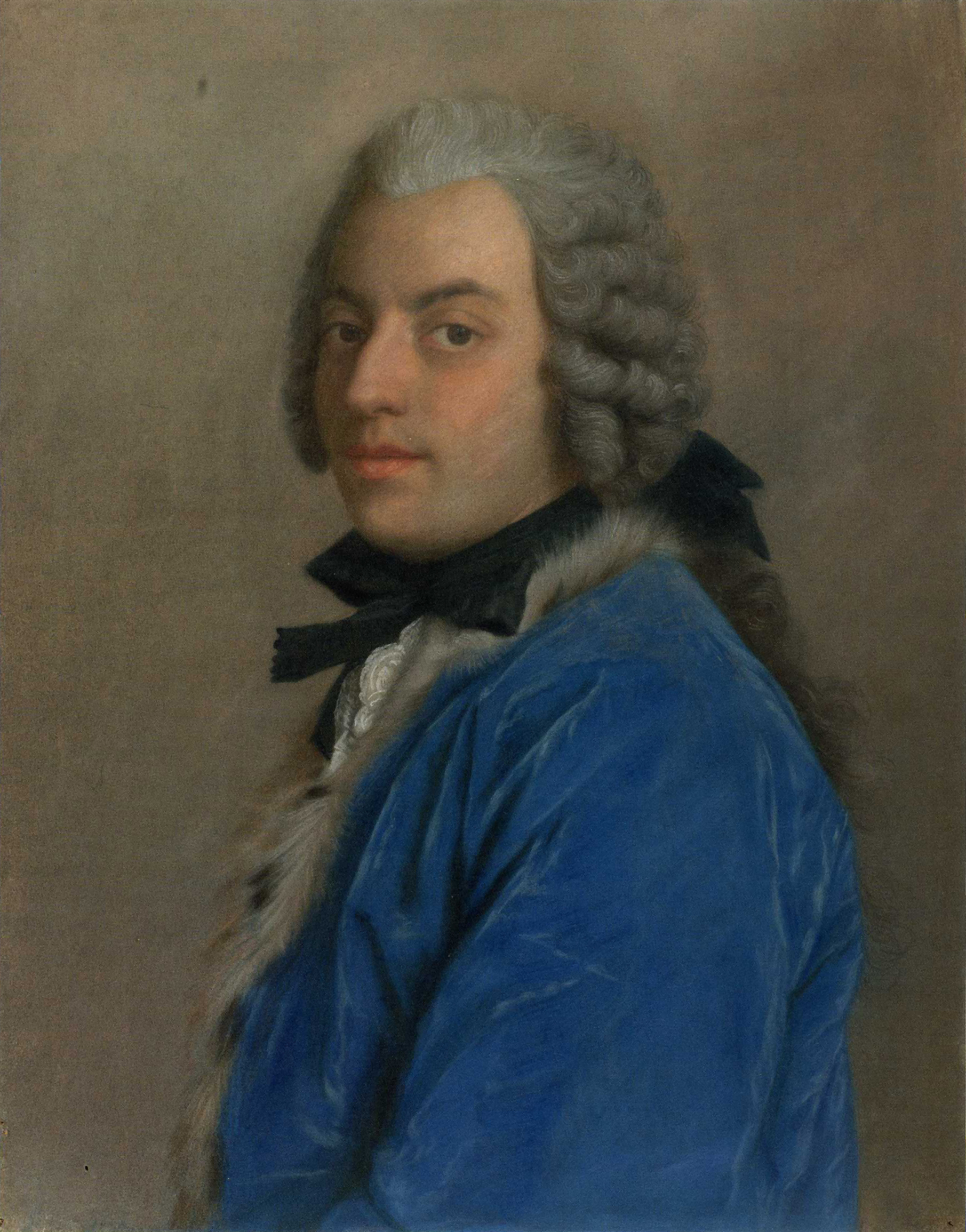
Francesco Algarotti born 11 December

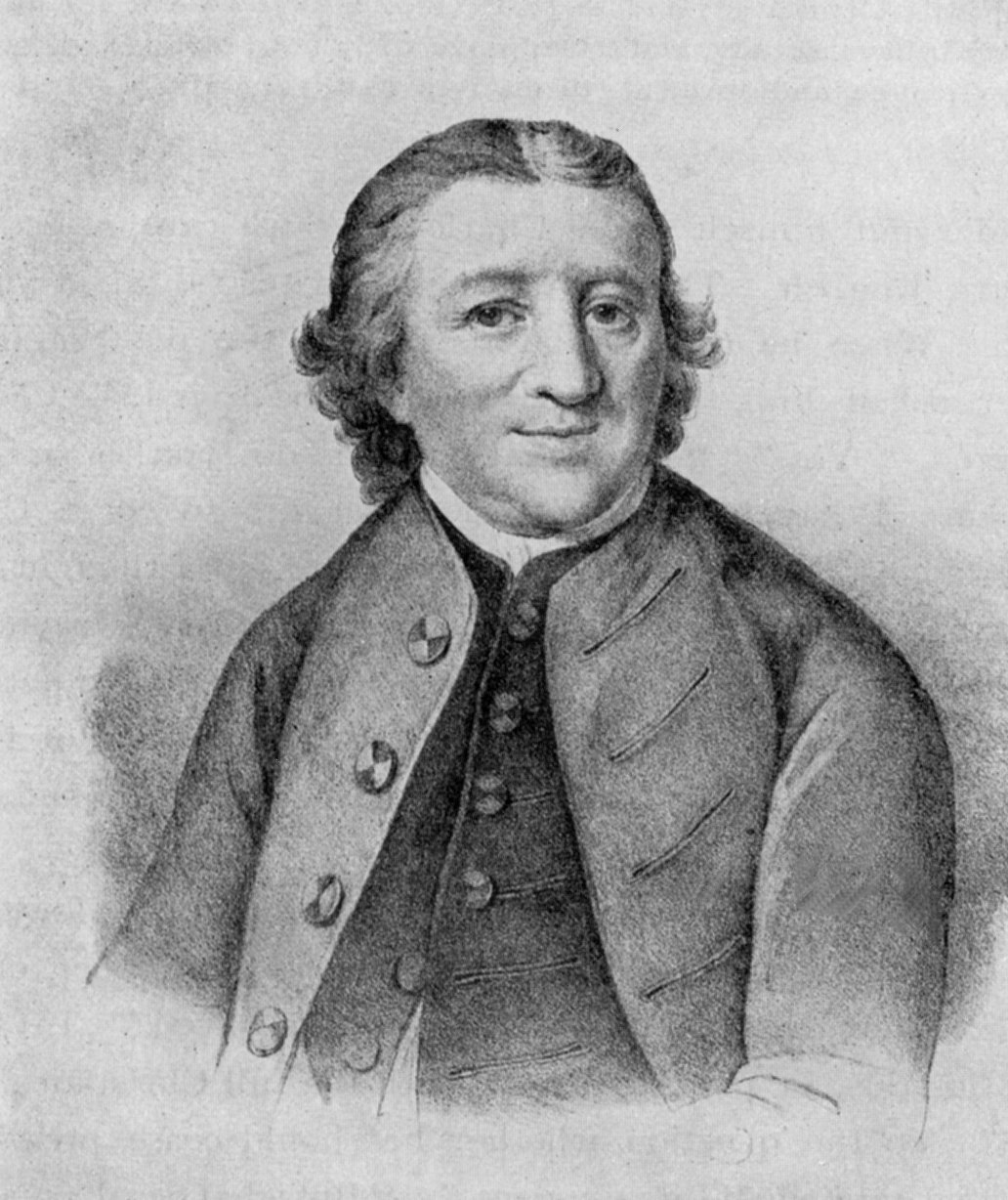
Peter Boehler born 31 December

- January 1 – Sir Richard Acton, 5th Baronet, English baronet (d. 1791)
- January 2 – Marie-Angélique Memmie Le Blanc, French feral child (d. 1775)
- January 5
  - Ludwig van Beethoven, Flemish-born German professional singer and music director, grandfather of the well known composer of the same name (d. 1773)
  - Hongzhou, Manchu prince of the Qing dynasty (d. 1770)
- January 17 – John Stanley, English composer and organist (d. 1786)
- January 24
  - Frederick the Great, King of Prussia (1740–1786) (d. 1786)
  - Charles Moore, 1st Earl of Charleville, Irish peer (d. 1764)
  - Georg Friedrich Schmidt, German engraver and designer (d. 1775)
- January 26 – James Habersham, merchant and statesman in the British North American colony of Georgia (d. 1775)
- January 28 – Tokugawa Ieshige, ninth shōgun of the Tokugawa shogunate of Japan (d. 1761)
- January 29 – Ralph Bigland, English officer of arms (d. 1784)
- February 2 – Lydia Taft, American suffragist (d. 1778)
- February 12 – Felton Hervey, aristocratic English politician (d. 1773)
- February 19 – Arthur Devis, English painter (d. 1787)
- February 20 – Sir Cordell Firebrace, 3rd Baronet, English landowner and politician (d. 1759)
- February 22 – Péter Bod, Hungarian theologian and historian (d. 1768)
- February 26 – Nasir Jung, Nizam of Hyderabad State (d. 1750)
- February 28 – Louis-Joseph de Montcalm, French general (d. 1759)
- March 4 – Joachim Friedrich Henckel, Prussian surgeon at Charité hospital in Berlin (d. 1779)
- March 8 – John Fothergill, British botanist (d. 1780)
- March 12
  - Sir Hew Dalrymple, 2nd Baronet, Scottish politician and MP for Haddington Burghs on two occasions (d. 1790)
  - Ioan II Mavrocordat, prince of Moldva (d. 1747)
- March 14 – Charles-Antoine Jombert, French bookseller and publisher (d. 1784)
- March 15 – Lambert Krahe, German history painter and art collector (d. 1790)
- March 19
  - Joseph Frye, American general (d. 1794)
  - Henry Gervais, Anglican priest in Ireland (d. 1790)
- March 22 – Edward Moore, English dramatist (d. 1757)
- March 27
  - Claude Bourgelat, French veterinary surgeon (d. 1779)
  - Jane Mecom, American correspondent, youngest sister of Benjamin Franklin and one of his closest confidants (d. 1794)
- March 28 – Empress Xiaoxianchun, empress consort of Qing dynasty China (d. 1748)
- March 31 – Anders Johan von Höpken, Swedish politician (d. 1789)
- April 8 – Pierre Pouchot, French military engineer officer (d. 1769)
- April 23 – Devasahayam Pillai, beatified Indian Catholic (d. 1752)
- April 28 – James Hewitt, 1st Viscount Lifford, Lord Chancellor of Ireland (d. 1789)
- May 2 – Thomas Bond, American physician and surgeon (d. 1784)
- May 5 – Janusz Aleksander Sanguszko, magnate in the Polish-Lithuanian Commonwealth (d. 1775)
- May 9 – William Pitcairn, Scottish physician and botanist (d. 1791)
- May 12 – Charles William Frederick, Margrave of Brandenburg-Ansbach (d. 1757)
- May 13 – Count Johann Hartwig Ernst von Bernstorff, German-Danish statesman (d. 1772)
- May 17 – Jean-Baptiste Greppo, French canon and archaeologist (d. 1767)
- May 18 – Increase Moseley, American politician (d. 1795)
- May 27 – Sir Thomas Cave, 5th Baronet of England (d. 1778)
- May 28 – Jacques Claude Marie Vincent de Gournay, French economist (d. 1759)
- May 29 – Thomas Dimsdale, English physician, banker (d. 1800)
- June 4 – Thomas Cotes, British Royal Navy officer, Commander-in-Chief of the Jamaica Station (d. 1767)
- June 7 – Infante Philip of Spain, Spanish infante (d. 1719)
- June 11 – Benjamin Ingham, American missionary (d. 1772)
- June 14
  - Samuel Blair, Ulster-born American pastor (d. 1751)
  - Sayat-Nova, Armenian musician and poet (d. 1795)
- June 15 – Andrew Gordon, Scottish Benedictine monk (d. 1751)
- June 21 – Luc Urbain de Bouëxic, comte de Guichen, French admiral (d. 1790)
- June 22 – Michael Heltzen, Norwegian mining engineer (d. 1770)
- June 25 – Exupere Joseph Bertin, French anatomist (d. 1781)
- June 26 – Johann Andreas Silbermann, German organ-builder (d. 1783)
- June 28 – Jean-Jacques Rousseau, Genevan philosopher (d. 1778)
- July 4 – George Hadow, British historian (d. 1780)
- July 9 – Charles-Étienne Pesselier, French playwright and librettist (d. 1763)
- July 12
  - Sir Francis Bernard, 1st Baronet, British Colonial governor of New Jersey and Massachusetts Bay (d. 1779)
  - Thomas Estcourt Cresswell, English politician (d. 1788)
- July 18 – Karl Frederick, Duke of Saxe-Meiningen, German noble (d. 1743)
- July 19 – Carl Fredrik Mennander, Swedish bishop (d. 1786)
- July 21 – Johann Karl Philipp von Cobenzl, Habsburg politician (d. 1770)
- July 24 – Richard Handcock, Irish priest (d. 1791)
- July 25 – Vincenzo Miotti, Italian physicist and astronomer (d. 1787)
- July 26
  - George Montagu, 1st Duke of Montagu, English peer (d. 1790)
  - William Pery, 1st Baron Glentworth, Anglican bishop (d. 1794)
- July 31 – Johann Samuel König, German mathematician (d. 1757)
- August 2 – Prince George of Kartli, Georgian prince (d. 1786)
- August 12
  - Jonas Hanway, English traveller and philanthropist (d. 1786)
  - Karl Jakob Weber, Italian archaeologist (d. 1764)
- August 15 – César Gabriel de Choiseul, French officer (d. 1785)
- August 24 – Michel-Barthélémy Ollivier, French painter and engraver (d. 1784)
- August 26 – Tadeusz Franciszek Ogiński, Polish noble (d. 1783)
- August 27 – William Graham, 2nd Duke of Montrose, member of the peerage of Scotland, son of James Graham (d. 1790)
- August 30 – George Montgomerie, British Member of Parliament (d. 1766)
- September 4 – Jan Verbruggen, Dutch master gun-founder in the Netherlands and later at the Royal Arsenal in Woolwich (d. 1781)
- September 11 – Giovanni Targioni Tozzetti, Italian naturalist (d. 1783)
- September 15 – Pierre Simon Fournier, French punch-cutter (d. 1768)
- September 22 – François-Joseph-Gaston de Partz de Pressy, French cleric (d. 1789)
- September 25 – James Veitch, Lord Elliock, Scottish politician (d. 1793)
- September 26
  - Alexander Hamilton, Scottish-born doctor and writer in colonial Maryland (d. 1756)
  - Dominique de La Rochefoucauld, French Catholic cardinal (d. 1800)
- October 1 – William Shippen Sr., American physician, anatomist and public figure (d. 1801)
- October 5 – Francesco Guardi, Italian painter (d. 1793)
- October 8 – Alison Cockburn, Scottish poet (d. 1794)
- October 14
  - George Grenville, Prime Minister of Great Britain (1763–1765) (d. 1770)
  - John Thomas, English churchman (Dean of Westminster, Bishop of Rochester) (d. 1793)
- October 15 – Leslie Corry, Irish politician (d. 1741)
- October 17
  - Landgravine Eleonore of Hesse-Rotenburg, countess (d. 1759)
  - Age Wijnalda, Dutch Mennonite minister (d. 1792)
- October 18 – Jeremias van Riemsdijk, Dutch colonial governor (d. 1777)
- October 19
  - Pedro, Prince of Brazil, second child of John V of Portugal and Maria Ana of Austria (d. 1714)
  - Zenobia Revertera, Italian noble and courtier (d. 1779)
- October 20 – Gregor Zallwein, Bavarian-born expert on canon law (d. 1766)
- October 21 – James Steuart, Scottish economist (d. 1780)
- October 22 – James Hamilton, 8th Earl of Abercorn, member of the peerage of Scotland and landowner in Ireland (d. 1789)
- October 24
  - Joanna Elisabeth of Holstein-Gottorp, German duchess (d. 1760)
  - Jonathan Nichols Jr., Rhode Island colonial deputy governor (d. 1756)
- October 29 – Paolo Gamba, Italian painter (d. 1782)
- October 30
  - Christian Wilhelm Ernst Dietrich, German painter and art administrator (d. 1774)
  - Giovanni Pietro Francesco Agius de Soldanis, Maltese linguist, historian and cleric (d. 1770)
- October 31 – Prince Moritz of Anhalt-Dessau, German prince of the House of Ascania (d. 1760)
- November 4
  - Charles de Fitz-James, Marshal of France (d. 1787)
  - Charles Louis de Marbeuf, French general (d. 1786)
- November 7 – Antoine Choquet de Lindu, French architect (d. 1790)
- November 11 – Hugolín Gavlovič, Slovak Franciscan priest, author of religious, moral and educational writings (d. 1787)
- November 20 – Guillaume Voiriot, French portrait painter (d. 1799)
- November 24
  - Ali II ibn Hussein, fourth leader of the Husainid Dynasty, ruler of Tunisia (d. 1782)
  - Charles-Michel de l'Épée, French priest and educator of the deaf (d. 1789)
- November 27 – Fernando de Sousa e Silva, fourth Patriarch of Lisbon (d. 1786)
- December 1 – George Boscawen, British Army general and politician (d. 1775)
- December 3
  - Joseph Relph, English poet (d. 1743)
  - William Sawyer, English professional cricketer (d. 1761)
- December 9 – Alexander Murray of Elibank, Scottish Jacobite intriguer, fourth son of Alexander Murray (d. 1778)
- December 11 – Francesco Algarotti, Venetian philosopher (d. 1764)
- December 12
  - Prince Charles Alexander of Lorraine, Lorraine-born Austrian general and soldier (d. 1780)
  - François-Antoine Devaux, Lorraine-born poet and man of letters (d. 1796)
  - John Turner, Massachusetts politician and delegate from Pembroke (d. 1794)
- December 25 – Pietro Chiari, Italian playwright (d. 1785)
- December 31
  - Peter Boehler, German-English Moravian bishop and missionary (d. 1775)
  - Charles, Prince of Nassau-Usingen (1718–1775) and Nassau-Saarbrücken (1728–1735) (d. 1775)

1713

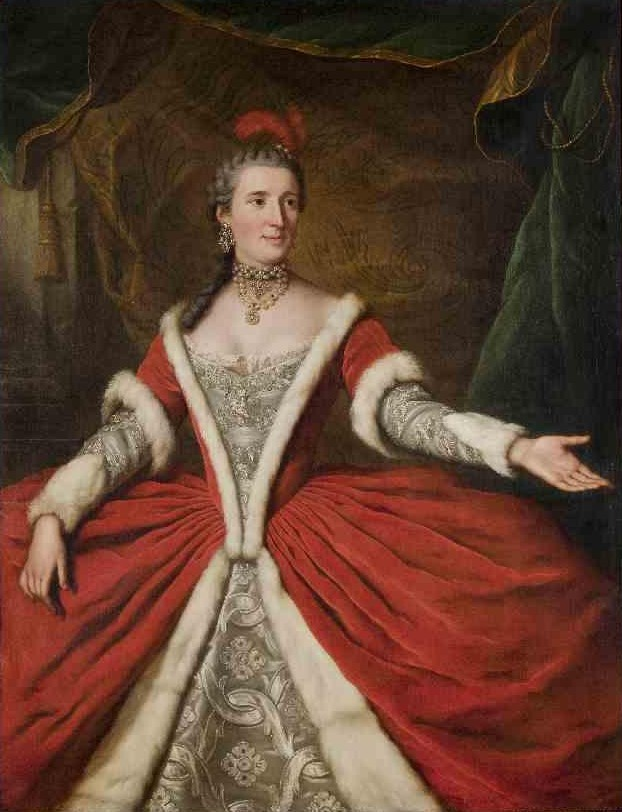
Marie Dumesnil born 2 January

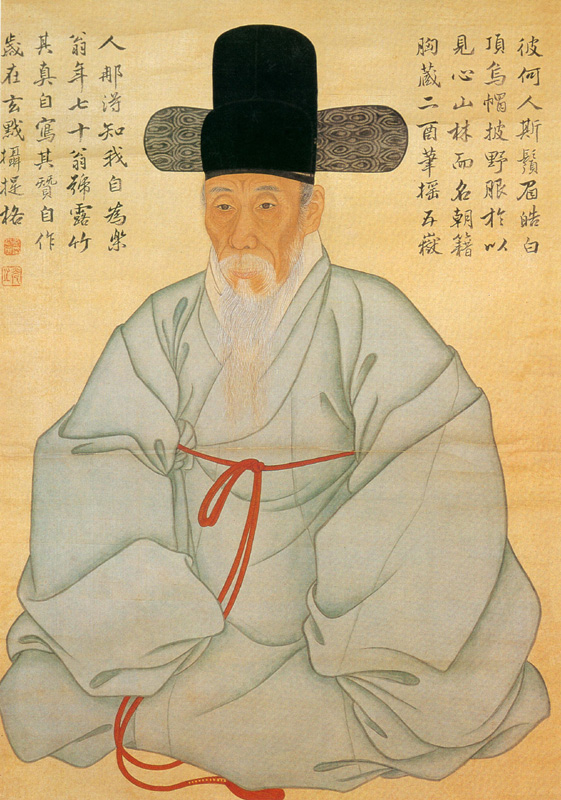
Gang Se-hwang born 25 January

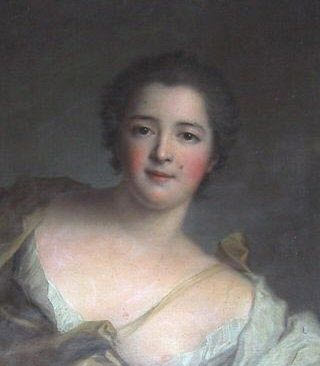
Diane Adélaïde de Mailly-Nesle born 11 February

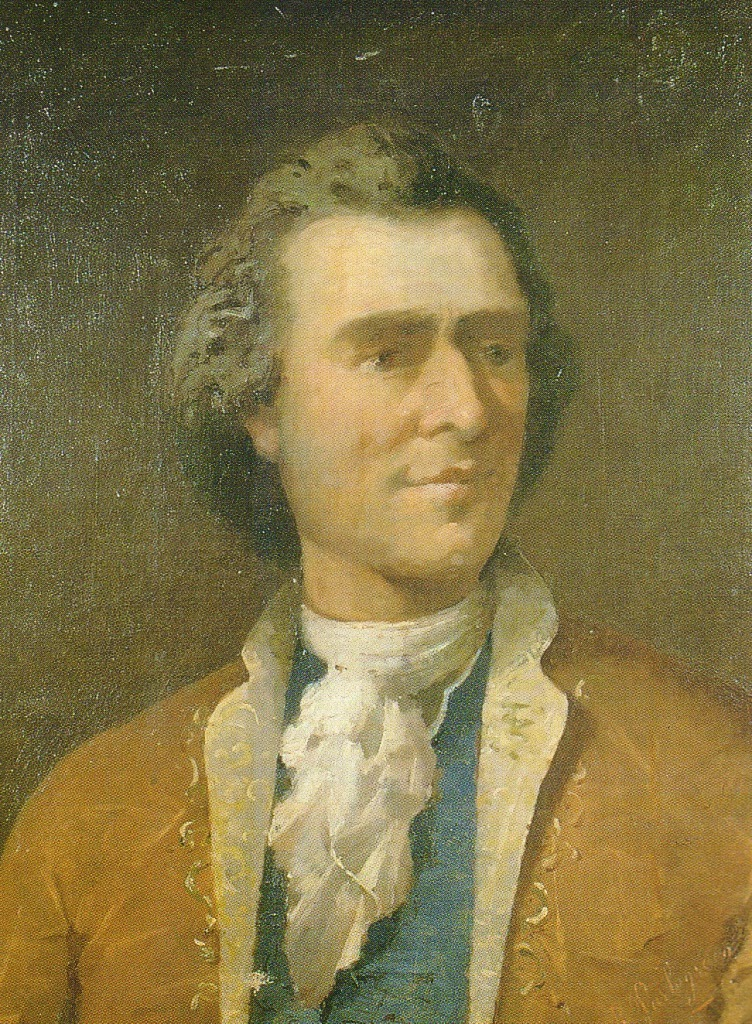
Domènec Terradellas born 13 February

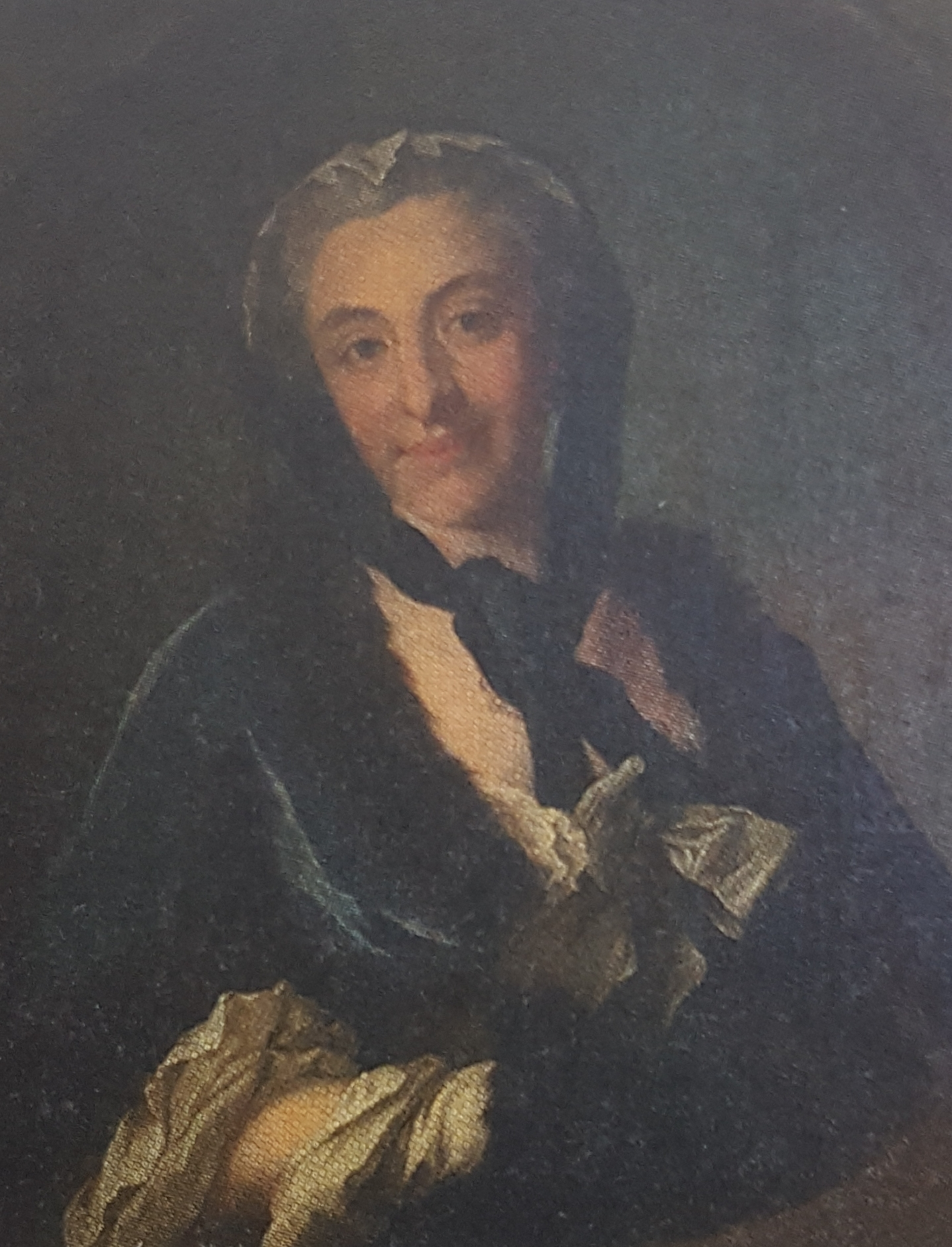
Anna Maria Elvia born 20 February

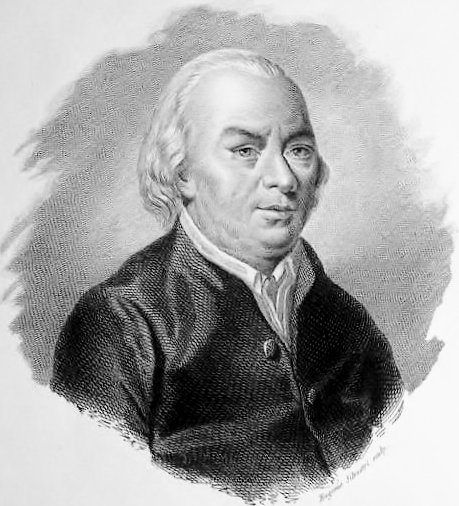
Gian Carlo Passeroni born 8 March

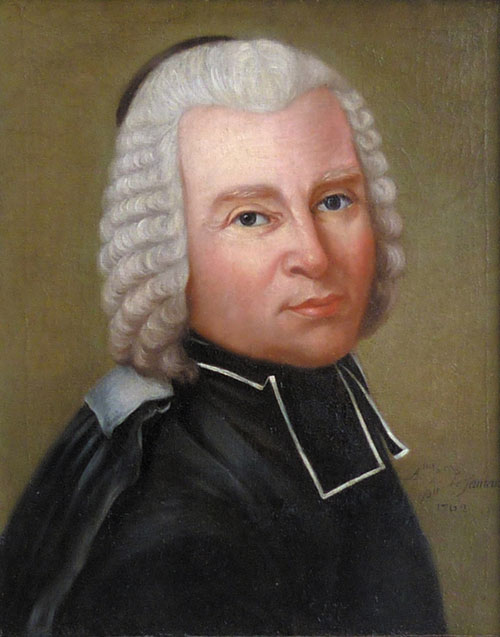
Nicolas-Louis de Lacaille born 15 March

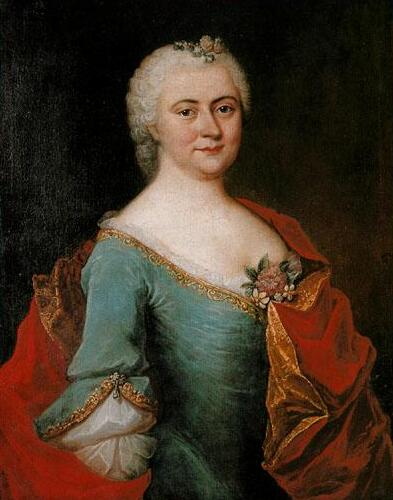
Luise Gottsched born 11 April

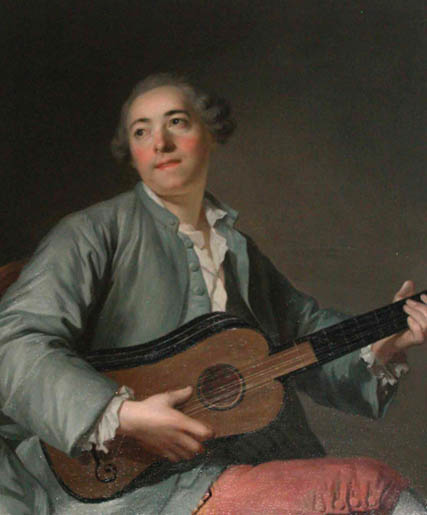
Pierre Jélyotte born 13 April

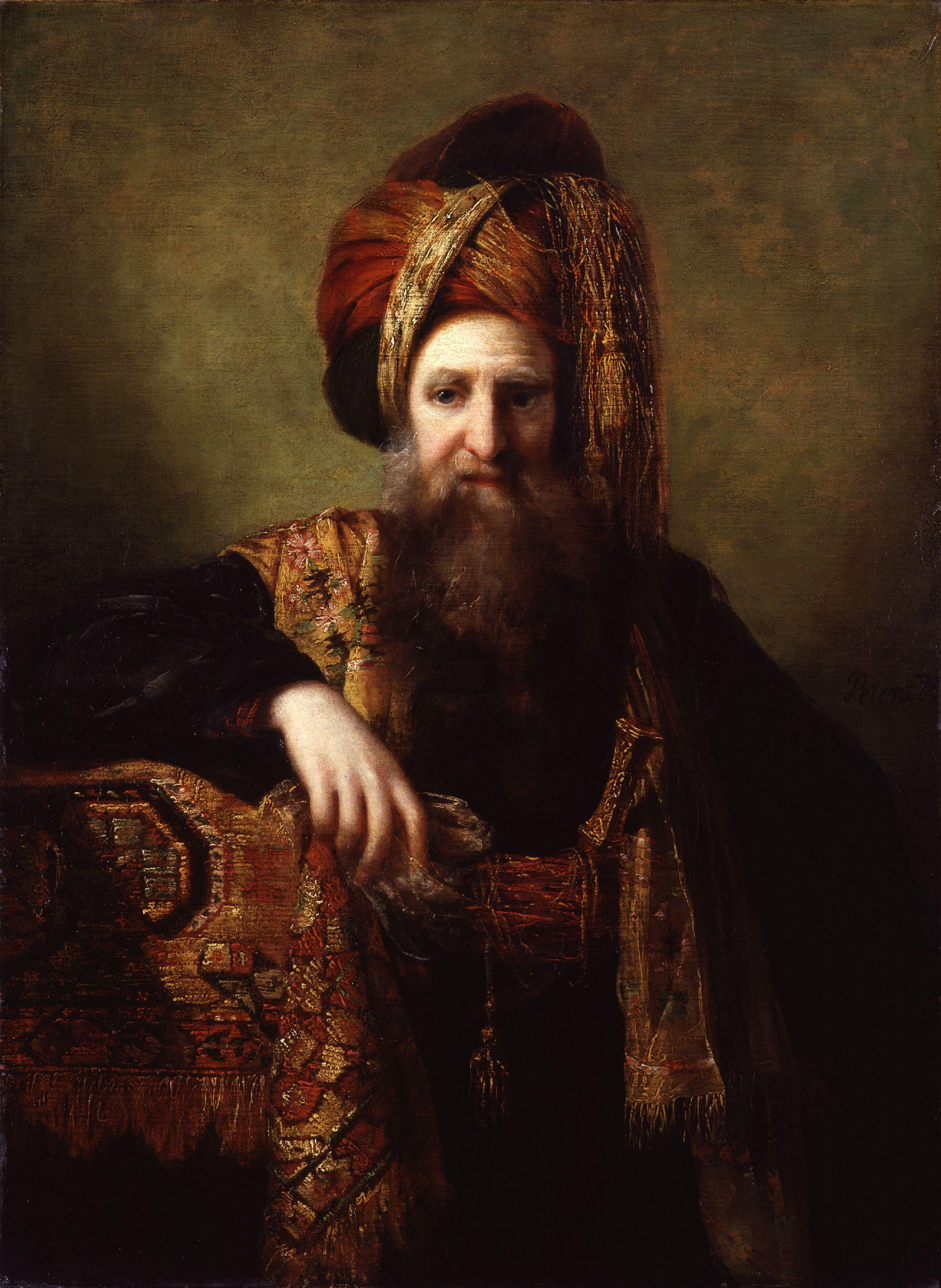
Edward Wortley Montagu born 15 May

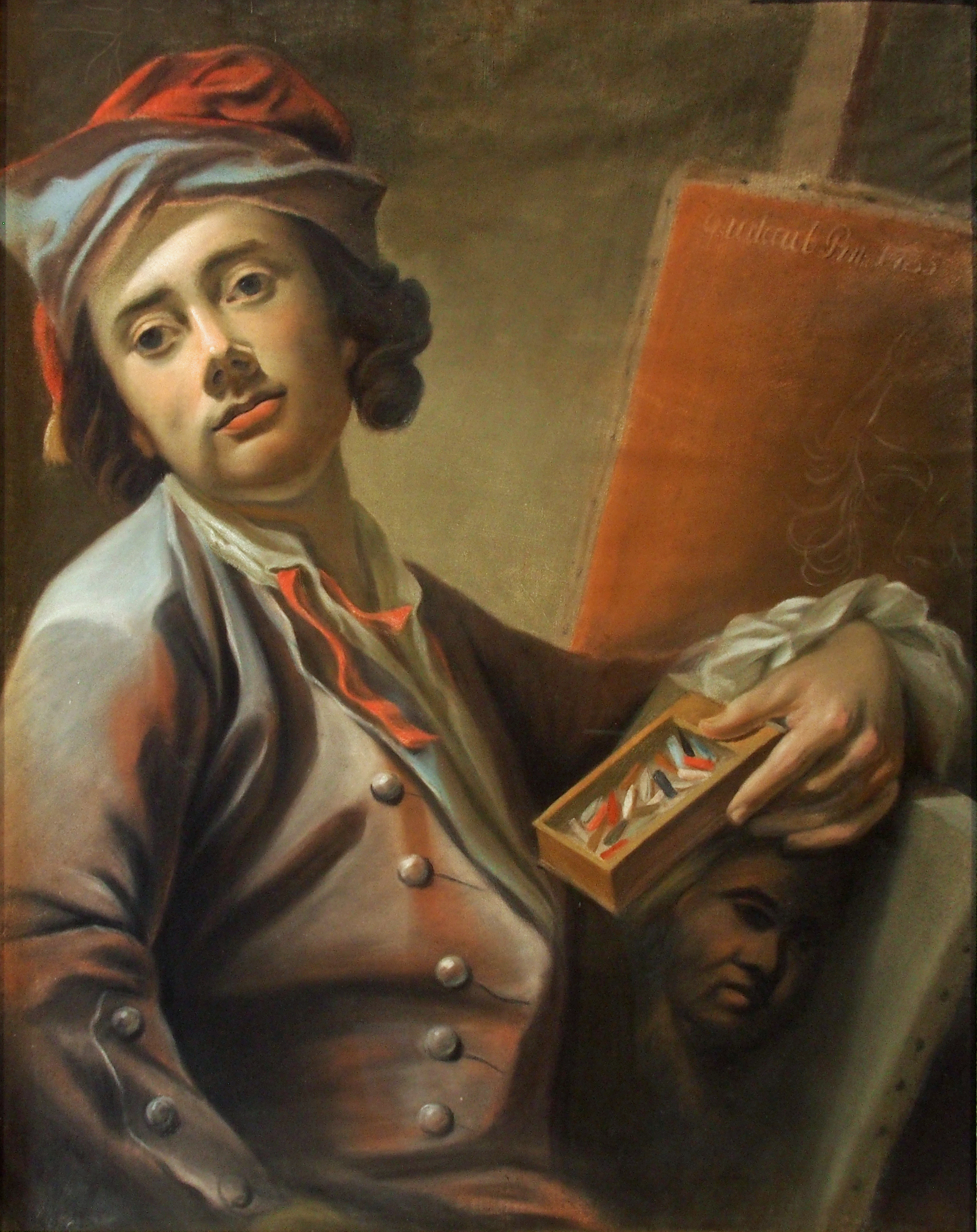
Georg Anton Urlaub born 20 June

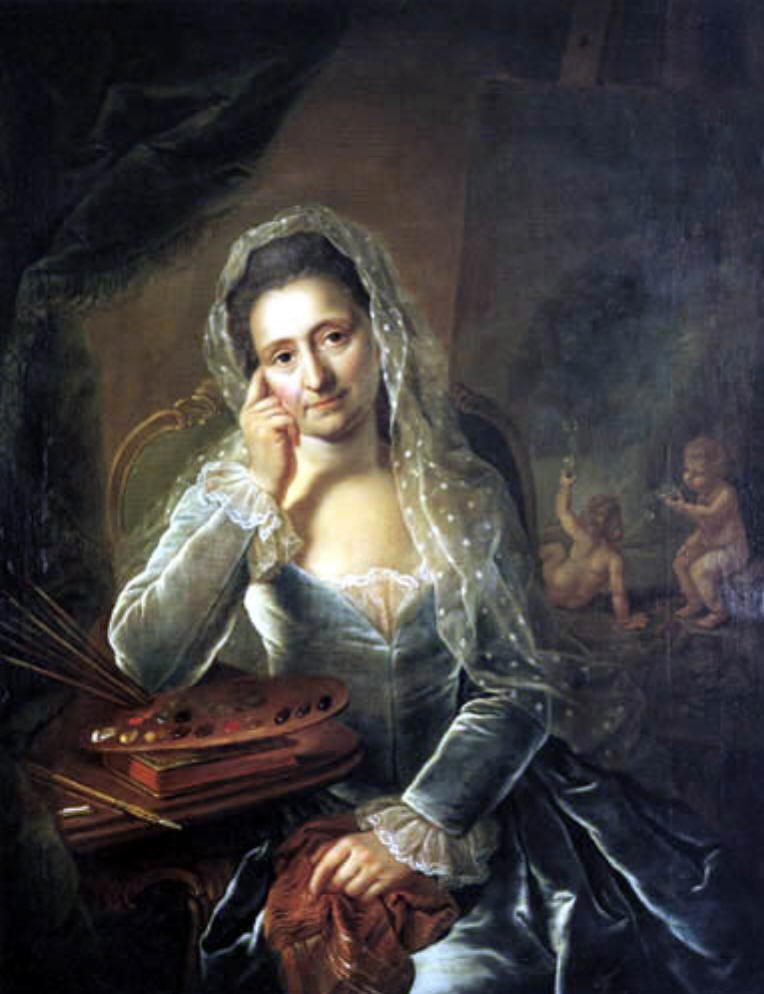
Anna Rosina de Gasc born 10 July

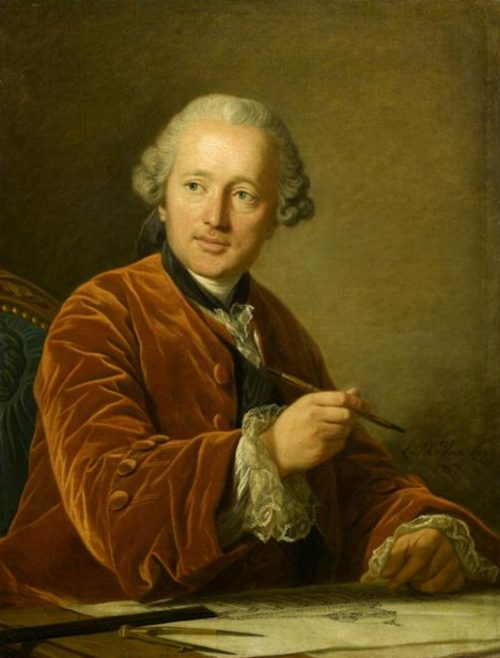
Jacques-Germain Soufflot born 22 July

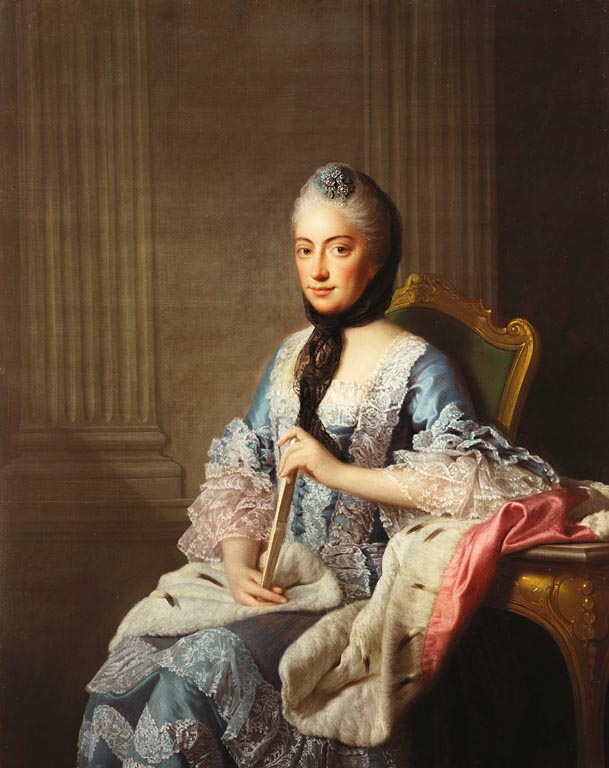
Princess Elisabeth Albertine of Saxe-Hildburghausen born 4 August

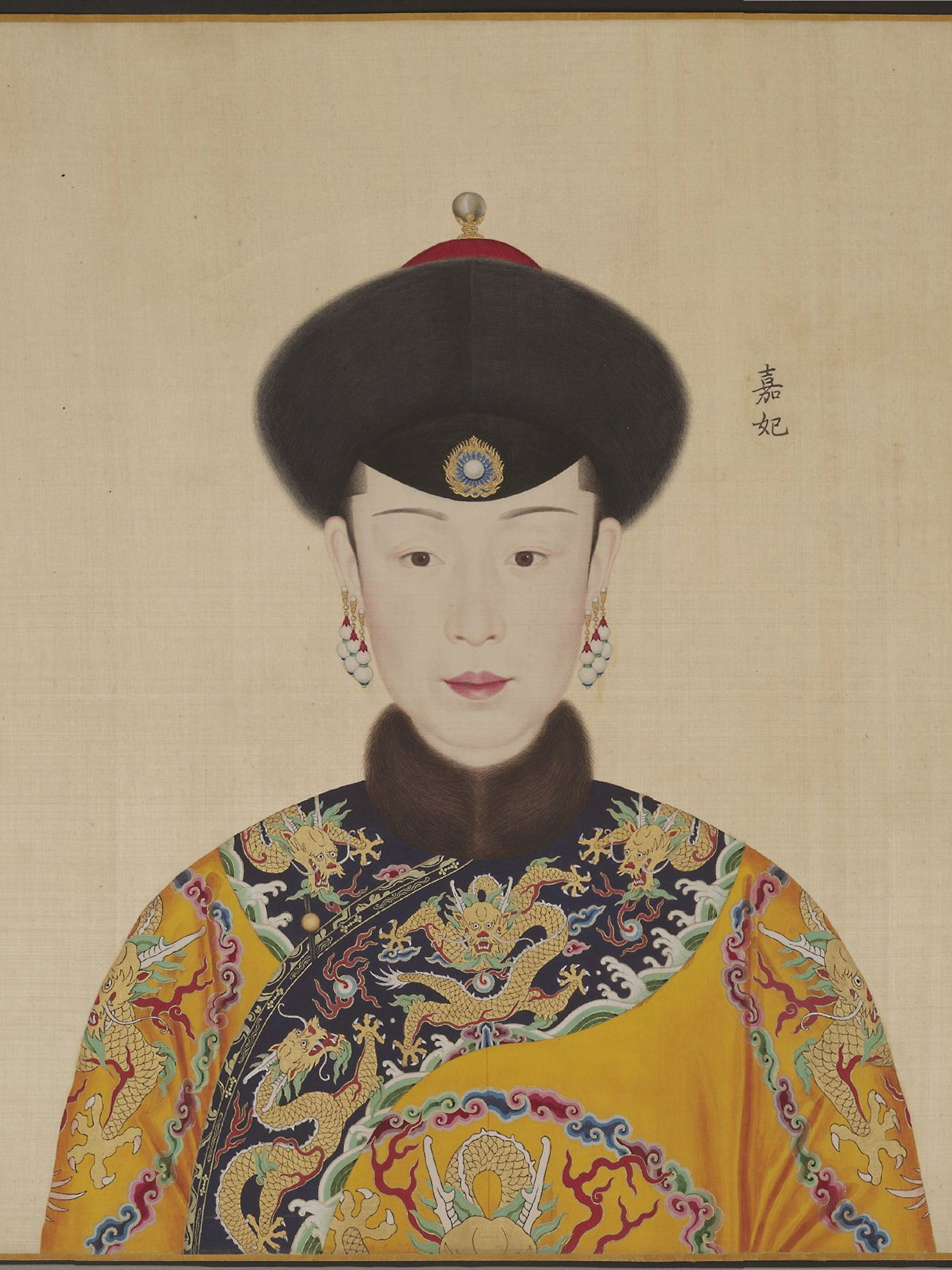
Imperial Noble Consort Shujia born 14 September

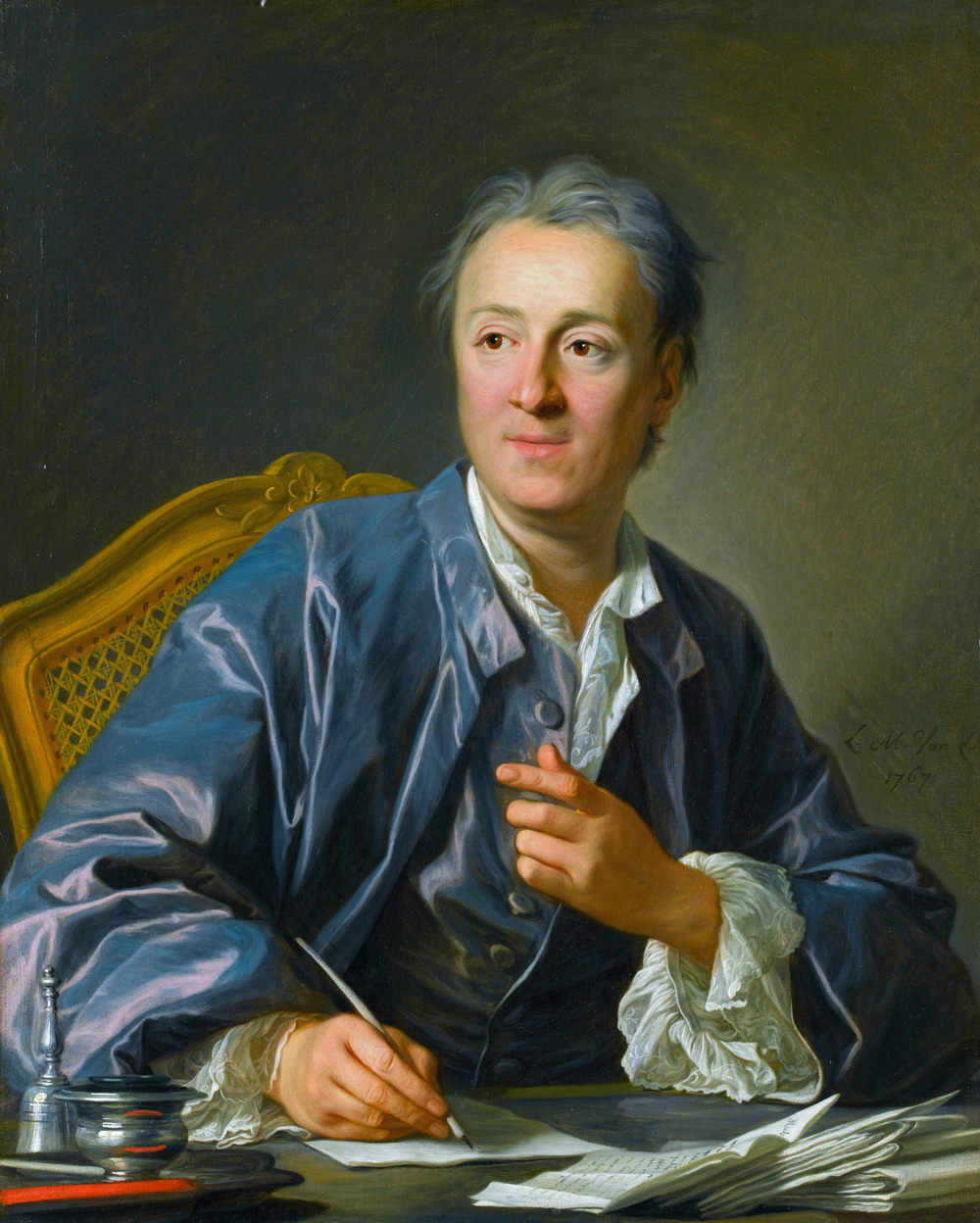
Denis Diderot born 5 October

Marie Fel born 24 October

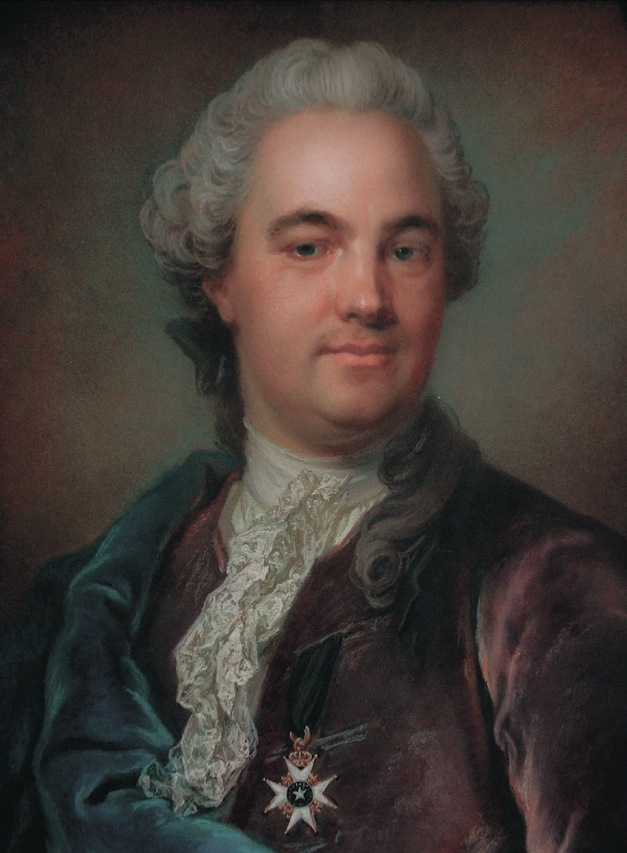
Abraham Bäck born 9 December

- January 1 – Carl Gustaf Warmholtz, Swedish writer (d. 1785)
- January 2 – Marie Dumesnil, French actress (d. 1803)
- January 5 – Jorge Juan y Santacilia, Spanish mathematician and naval officer (d. 1773)
- January 7 – Giovanni Battista Locatelli, Italian impresario and librettist (d. 1785)
- January 13 – Charlotte Charke, British actor and writer (d. 1760)
- January 17 – Jean Chrétien Fischer, French general (d. 1762)
- January 18 – Grigory Spiridov, Russian admiral (d. 1790)
- January 22 – Marc-Antoine Laugier, French Jesuit priest and architectural theorist (d. 1769)
- January 25 – Gang Se-hwang, Joseon Dynasty painter (d. 1791)
- January 29 – Edmé-François Mallet, French writer (d. 1755)
- January 31
  - Anthony Benezet, French-born American abolitionist and educator (d. 1784)
  - Adam Drummond, Scottish merchant banker and politician (d. 1786)
- February 2 – Maria Margarida de Lorena, 2nd Duchess of Abrantes, Portuguese noblewoman and courtier (d. 1780)
- February 5 – Edwin Lascelles, 1st Baron Harewood, British Baron (d. 1795)
- February 7 – Sir Henry Moore, 1st Baronet, Governor of Jamaica and New York (d. 1769)
- February 11 – Diane Adélaïde de Mailly-Nesle, Mistress of Louis XV (d. 1769)
- February 12 – Kenrick Clayton, British politician (d. 1769)
- February 13 – Domènec Terradellas, Spanish opera composer (d. 1751)
- February 14
  - Jan ten Compe, painter from the Northern Netherlands (d. 1761)
  - Vittoria Ligari, Italian painter (d. 1783)
- February 20 – Anna Maria Elvia, Swedish feminist writer (d. 1784)
- February 26 – Pyotr Sheremetev, Russian noble (d. 1788)
- February 28 – Louis-Auguste-Augustin d'Affry, French diplomat (d. 1793)
- March 2 – Giammaria Ortes, Italian composer and academic (d. 1790)
- March 5
  - Edward Cornwallis, British military officer, first Governor of Nova Scotia (d. 1776)
  - Frederick Cornwallis, Archbishop of Canterbury (d. 1783)
- March 8 – Gian Carlo Passeroni, Italian writer (d. 1803)
- March 9 – Daniel Fones, American military commander (d. 1790)
- March 12 – Johann Adolph Hass, German clavichord maker (d. 1771)
- March 15 – Nicolas-Louis de Lacaille, French astronomer (d. 1762)
- March 17 – Sir Charles Asgill, 1st Baronet, British politician (d. 1788)
- March 21 – Francis Lewis, Signatory of the US Declaration of Independence, from Wales (d. 1803)
- March 23 – Bowen Southwell, Irish politician (d. 1796)
- March 26 – Peter Oliver, Massachusetts loyalist colonial judge (d. 1791)
- March 28 – Juan Nentvig, German anthropologist (d. 1768)
- March 29 – John Ponsonby, Irish politician (d. 1787)
- April 2 – Pier Francesco Foggini, Italian writer (d. 1783)
- April 3 – William Inglis, Scottish surgeon (d. 1792)
- April 7 – Nicola Sala, Italian opera composer and music theorist (d. 1801)
- April 10 – John Whitehurst, English clockmaker (d. 1788)
- April 11 – Luise Gottsched, German poet, playwright, essayist and translator (d. 1762)
- April 12
  - Sir Edward Crofton, 4th Baronet, Anglo-Irish politician (d. 1745)
  - Guillaume Thomas François Raynal, French writer, man of letters (d. 1796)
- April 13 – Pierre Jélyotte, French operatic tenor (d. 1797)
- April 17 – Samuel Graves, British Royal Navy admiral (d. 1787)
- April 21
  - Anna Maria Hilfeling, Swedish artist (d. 1783)
  - Louis de Noailles, French peer and Marshal of France (d. 1793)
- April 22
  - Brita Sophia De la Gardie, Swedish actress (d. 1797)
  - Peter Du Cane Sr., British businessman (d. 1803)
- May 6 – Charles Batteux, French philosopher, writer on aesthetics (d. 1780)
- May 7 – Charles Townley, British Officer of Arms (d. 1774)
- May 11 – James Drummond, 3rd Duke of Perth, Scottish Jacobite army officer (d. 1746)
- May 13
  - Alexis Clairaut, French mathematician, astronomer, and geophysicist (d. 1765)
  - Louis François de Monteynard, French soldier, statesman (d. 1791)
- May 15
  - József Károly Hell, Hungarian mining engineer (d. 1789)
  - Edward Wortley Montagu, British politician, traveller and author (d. 1776)
- May 17 – Élie Bertrand, Swiss scientist (d. 1797)
- May 25
  - Andrzej Mokronowski, Polish general (d. 1783)
  - John Stuart, 3rd Earl of Bute, British politician, Prime Minister of Great Britain (d. 1792)
- May 31 – Giuseppe Maria Buonaparte, Corsican politician (d. 1763)
- June 3 – Robert Petre, 8th Baron Petre, British peer, renowned horticulturist (d. 1742)
- June 10 – Princess Caroline of Great Britain, fourth child and third daughter of George II (d. 1757)
- June 11
  - John Allen, 3rd Viscount Allen, Irish politician (d. 1745)
  - Edward Capell, English Shakespearean scholar; (d. 1781)
- June 13
  - Imperial Noble Consort Chunhui, Consort of Chinese Emperor (d. 1760)
  - Antonio Eugenio Visconti, Italian cardinal (d. 1788)
- June 16 – Meshech Weare, First Governor of New Hampshire (d. 1786)
- June 17 – Hongjiao, Chinese Qing dynasty imperial prince (d. 1764)
- June 20 – Georg Anton Urlaub, German painter (d. 1759)
- June 22 – Lord John Sackville, English gentleman and cricketer (d. 1765)
- June 25 – Marie-Marguerite Brun, French poet (d. 1794)
- June 29 – Johannes de Bosch, painter from the Northern Netherlands (d. 1785)
- July 1 – Benjamin Green, Nova Scotian merchant, judge, and political figure (d. 1772)
- July 5
  - Stanhope Aspinwall, British diplomat (d. 1771)
  - Jean Godin des Odonais, French cartographer and naturalist (d. 1792)
- July 9 – John Newbery, English publisher and bookseller (d. 1767)
- July 10 – Anna Rosina de Gasc, German portrait painter (d. 1783)
- July 14 – Nicole du Hausset, French memoirist (d. 1801)
- July 16 – Carlo Murena, architect (d. 1764)
- July 18
  - Robert Dundas of Arniston, the younger, Scottish judge (d. 1787)
  - Gaetano Matteo Pisoni, Swiss-Italian architect (d. 1782)
- July 22 – Jacques-Germain Soufflot, French architect in neoclassicism (d. 1780)
- July 23
  - Juan de Miralles, Spanish diplomat (d. 1780)
  - Luís António Verney, Portuguese philosopher and pedagogue (d. 1792)
- July 27 – Princess Sophie Charlotte of Brandenburg-Bayreuth, duchess consort of Saxe-Weimar (d. 1746)
- August 1 – Charles I, Duke of Brunswick-Wolfenbüttel, Duke of Brunswick-Wolfenbüttel (d. 1780)
- August 3 – Johan Georg Lillienberg, Swedish count and politician (d. 1798)
- August 4
  - Bernardo de Miera y Pacheco, Spanish cartographer (d. 1785)
  - Princess Elisabeth Albertine of Saxe-Hildburghausen, Duchess consort of Mecklenburg-Strelitz (d. 1761)
- August 6 – Marie Sophie de Courcillon, French noblewoman and Duchess of Rohan-Rohan, Princess of Soubise by marriage (d. 1756)
- August 9 – James Murray, loyalist during the American Revolution (d. 1781)
- August 11 – Lebbeus Harris, Canadian politician (d. 1792)
- August 13 – David Franco Mendes, Dutch poet (d. 1792)
- August 17 – Antoine de Montazet, French archbishop (d. 1788)
- August 18 – Arthur Champagne, Irish Anglican priest (d. 1799)
- August 25 – Vijaya Raghunatha Raya Tondaiman I, Raja of Pudukkottai (d. 1769)
- August 27 – Anton August Beck, German engraver (d. 1787)
- September 3 – Jean Baptiste de La Vérendrye, one of the founders of the present province of Manitoba (d. 1736)
- September 9 – Robert Bremner, British music publisher (d. 1789)
- September 10
  - Gowin Knight, British physicist (d. 1772)
  - John Needham, English biologist and Roman Catholic priest (d. 1781)
- September 13 – Giuseppe Maria Buondelmonti, Italian philosopher (d. 1757)
- September 14
  - Johann Kies, German astronomer and mathematician (d. 1781)
  - Imperial Noble Consort Shujia, consort of the Qianlong Emperor (d. 1755)
- September 16 – Charles Lucas, Irish apothecary, physician and politician (d. 1771)
- September 20 – Louis Du Pont Duchambon de Vergor, French military officer (d. 1775)
- September 21 – Domingo de Bonechea, Spanish explorer (d. 1775)
- September 22 – Ferenc Farkas de Boldogfa, Hungarian nobleman, jurist, landowner, vice-ispán of the county of Zala (d. 1770)
- September 23 – Ferdinand VI of Spain, king of Spain, lived (d. 1759)
- October 2 – Henry Tucker of The Grove, Bermudian merchant, politician and Militia officer (d. 1787)
- October 3 – Antoine Dauvergne, French composer and violinist (d. 1797)
- October 5 – Denis Diderot, French philosopher (d. 1784)
- October 7 – Granville Elliott, Army General, British military expert, working for Britain and Palatine forces (d. 1759)
- October 8 – Yechezkel Landau, influential Polish authority on halakha (Jewish law) (d. 1793)
- October 9 – Mikhail Volkonsky, Russian statesman and military figure from the House of Volkonsky (d. 1788)
- October 12 – Khawaja Muhammad Zaman of Luari, Sindhi Sufi poet (d. 1775)
- October 13
  - Allan Ramsay, Scottish portrait painter (d. 1784)
  - Jacques de Romas, French physicist (d. 1776)
- October 20
  - Benjamin Andrew, American politician (d. 1790)
  - James Cecil, 6th Earl of Salisbury, English noble (d. 1780)
  - Joseph Redlhamer, Austrian physicist (d. 1761)
- October 23 – Pieter Burman the Younger, Dutch lawyer and philologist (d. 1778)
- October 24 – Marie Fel, French opera singer (d. 1794)
- October 30 – Giuseppe Antonio Landi, Italian architect and painter (d. 1791)
- November 1 – Antonio Genovesi, Italian economist (d. 1769)
- November 5 – Gorges Lowther, Member of the Irish House of Commons (d. 1792)
- November 6 – Thomas Osborne, 4th Duke of Leeds, British politician (d. 1789)
- November 13 – Nicolas Luton Durival, French historian (d. 1795)
- November 14 – Blasius Columban, Baron von Bender, Luxembourgish politician (d. 1798)
- November 17 – August de la Motte, German general (d. 1788)
- November 24
  - Junípero Serra, Spanish Christian missionary (d. 1784)
  - Laurence Sterne, Anglo-Irish novelist and Anglican cleric (d. 1768)
- November 28 – Georg Friedrich Brander, German precision mechanic and mathematician (d. 1783)
- November 30 – Johann Balthasar Bullinger, Swiss landscape painter (d. 1793)
- December 4 – Gasparo Gozzi, Venetian critic and dramatist (d. 1786)
- December 9 – Abraham Bäck, physician (d. 1795)
- December 10 – Johann Nicolaus Mempel, German composer and musician (d. 1747)
- December 13 – John Baptist Caryll, third Jacobite Baron Caryll of Durford (d. 1788)
- December 14 – Martin Knutzen, German philosopher (d. 1751)
- December 15 – Welbore Ellis, 1st Baron Mendip, English politician (d. 1802)
- December 17 – Antoine-Noé de Polier de Bottens, Swiss theologian (d. 1783)
- December 19 – Jonathan Toup, British philologist (d. 1785)
- December 23 – Maruyama Gondazaemon, Japanese sumo wrestler (d. 1749)
- December 27 – Giovanni Battista Borra, Italian architect and engineer (d. 1770)
- December 29
  - André-Joseph Blavier, Belgian composer (d. 1782)
  - Nicolas Louis de Lacaille, French astronomer (d. 1762)
  - Herman Petersen, Swedish merchant (d. 1765)

1714

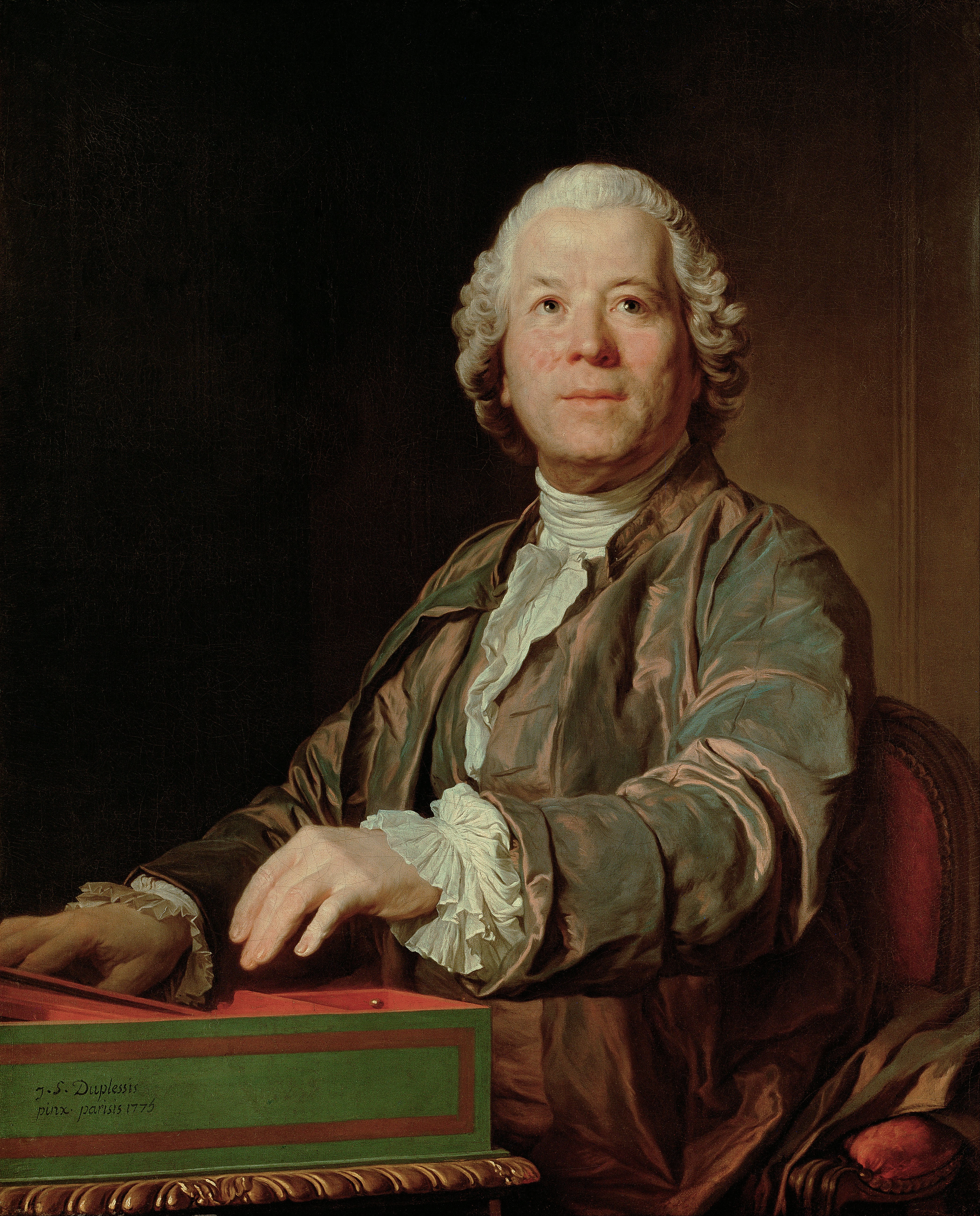
Christoph Willibald Gluck

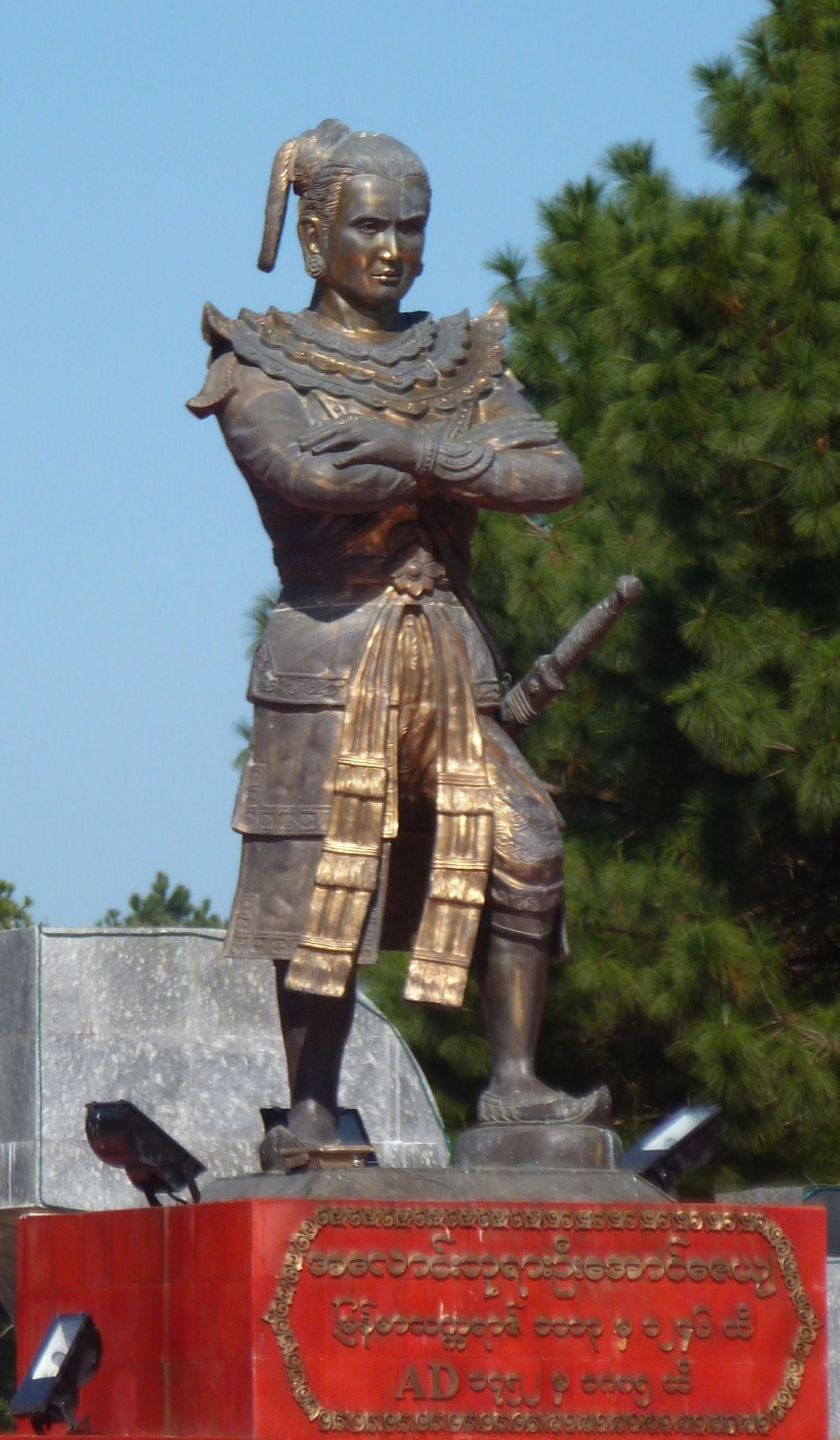
Alaungpaya

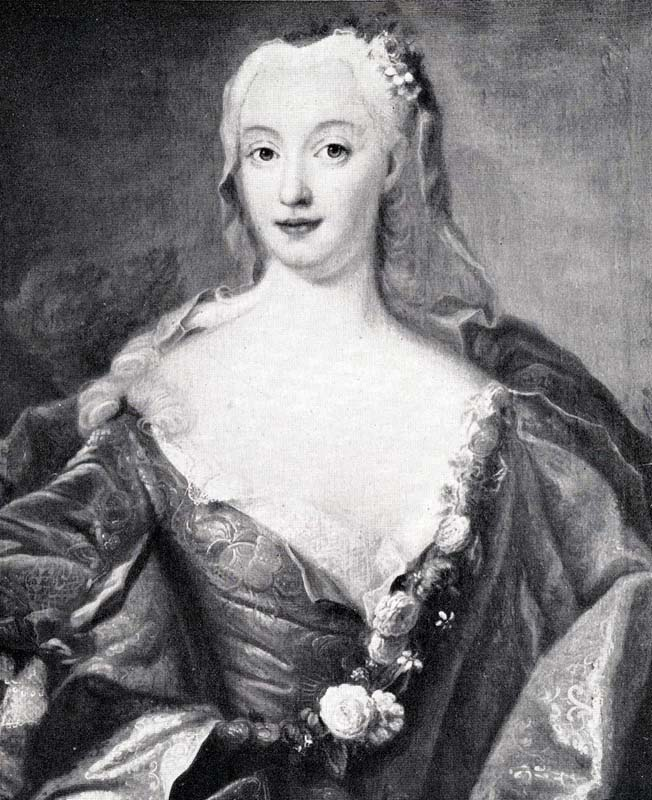
Hedvig Taube

- January 1
  - Kristijonas Donelaitis, Prussian-Lithuanian Lutheran pastor, poet, author of The Seasons (d. 1780)
  - Giovanni Battista Mancini, Italian soprano castrato, voice teacher and author of books on singing (d. 1800)
- January 6
  - John Christopher Hartwick, Lutheran minister in Colonial America, founder of Hartwick College (d. 1796)
  - Percivall Pott, English surgeon (d. 1788)
- January 9 – Elisabeth Stierncrona, Swedish noble (d. 1769)
- January 10 – Johann Georg Dominicus von Linprun, German scientist (d. 1787)
- January 16
  - Francis V de Beauharnais, French nobleman, soldier, politician, colonial governor and admiral (d. 1800)
  - Carl Jesper Benzelius, Swedish bishop (d. 1793)
- January 20 – Hugh Farmer, British theologian (d. 1787)
- January 21 – Anna Morandi Manzolini, internationally known Italian anatomist and anatomical wax modeler (d. 1774)
- January 24 – Henri Joseph Bouchard d'Esparbès de Lussan d'Aubeterre, Marshal of France (d. 1788)
- January 26 – Jean-Baptiste Pigalle, French sculptor (d. 1785)
- February 1
  - Nicolaus Christian Friis, Norwegian priest and writer (d. 1777)
  - Ralph Verney, 2nd Earl Verney of Ireland (d. 1791)
- February 2 – Gottfried August Homilius, German composer, cantor and organist (d. 1785)
- February 5 – Johann Gottlieb Gleditsch, German botanist (d. 1786)
- February 11 – Count Karl-Wilhelm Finck von Finckenstein, German-Prussian diplomat and later Prime Minister of Prussia (d. 1800)
- February 12 – Sebastian Sailer, German Premonstratensian preacher, writer (d. 1777)
- February 14 – William Vane, 2nd Viscount Vane of Ireland (d. 1789)
- February 18 – John Howe, 2nd Baron Chedworth of England, eldest son of John Howe (d. 1762)
- February 22
  - Louis-Georges de Bréquigny, French scholar (d. 1795)
  - Sarah Osborn, American writer (d. 1796)
- February 25
  - René Nicolas Charles Augustin de Maupeou, Chancellor of France (d. 1792)
  - Sir Hyde Parker, 5th Baronet, Royal Navy vice admiral (d. 1782)
- February 26 – James Hervey, English clergyman and writer (d. 1758)
- February 28 – Gioacchino Conti, Italian opera singer (d. 1761)
- March 1 – Aleksandr Aleksandrovich Menshikov, Russian army officer (d. 1764)
- March 2 – John Hamilton, Royal Navy officer (d. 1755)
- March 6 – Jean-Baptiste Marie Pierre, French painter (d. 1789)
- March 7 – Charles Thomas, Prince of Löwenstein-Wertheim-Rochefort, German nobleman, head of the House of Löwenstein-Wertheim-Rochefort (d. 1789)
- March 8 – Carl Philipp Emanuel Bach, German Classical composer (d. 1788)
- March 11 – Cornelis Elout, Dutch regent (d. 1779)
- March 17 – Maximilian Reichsgraf von Hamilton, German-born Czech Catholic bishop (d. 1776)
- March 19 – Aymar Joseph de Roquefeuil et du Bousquet, French admiral (d. 1782)
- March 21 – Charles Pratt, 1st Earl Camden, British judge (d. 1794)
- March 25
  - Friedrich Christian Glume, German artist (d. 1752)
  - Matthew Griswold (governor), 17th Governor of Connecticut (1784–1786) (d. 1799)
- March 27 – Francesco Antonio Zaccaria, Italian theologian (d. 1795)
- March 29 – Mahadhammaraza Dipadi, last Toungoo Dynasty king of Burma (Myanmar) (1733–1752) (d. 1754)
- April 1 – Jean-François de Neufforge, Flemish architect and engraver (d. 1791)
- April 7 – John Elwes (politician), British politician (d. 1789)
- April 14 – Adam Gib, Scottish religious leader (d. 1788)
- April 15 – Claude Yvon, French encyclopedist (d. 1791)
- April 16 – Pedro António Avondano, Italian composer (d. 1782)
- April 18 – Jacques-Nompar III de Caumont, duc de La Force, French nobleman (d. 1755)
- April 25 – Emer de Vattel, Swiss philosopher (d. 1767)
- May 6
  - Anton Raaff, German opera tenor (d. 1797)
  - James Townley, British dramatist (d. 1778)
- May 10 – Sophie Charlotte Ackermann, German actress from Berlin (d. 1792)
- May 12 – Johan Daniel Berlin, Norwegian composer and organist (d. 1787)
- May 14 – William Whitmore, British general (d. 1771)
- May 17 – Princess Anne Charlotte of Lorraine, French royal (d. 1773)
- May 20 – Henry Bathurst, 2nd Earl Bathurst, British lawyer and politician (d. 1794)
- June 6 – Joseph I of Portugal, Prince of Brazil (d. 1777)
- June 17 – César-François Cassini de Thury, French astronomer and cartographer (d. 1784)
- June 23 – Giovanni Sarnelli, Italian painter (d. 1793)
- July 1 – Michael Lally (brigadier-general), Irish-born French brigadier-general (d. 1773)
- July 2 – Christoph Willibald Gluck, German composer (d. 1787)
- July 8
  - Friedrich Gottfried Abel, German physician (d. 1794)
  - Pieter van Reede van Oudtshoorn, Dutch administrator of the Cape Colony (d. 1773)
- July 12 – Mikhail Illarionovich Vorontsov, Russian noble, politician (d. 1767)
- July 16 – Marc René, marquis de Montalembert, French military engineer and writer (d. 1800)
- July 17
  - Alexander Gottlieb Baumgarten, German philosopher (d. 1762)
  - John Forbes (Royal Navy officer), British admiral of the fleet (d. 1796)
- July 21 – Grand Duchess Natalya Alexeyevna of Russia (1714–1728), Russian grand duchess (d. 1728)
- August 1
  - Edward Penny, British painter (d. 1791)
  - Richard Wilson (painter), Welsh landscape painter (d. 1782)
- August 14 – Claude Joseph Vernet, French painter (d. 1789)
- August 15 – Philip Stanhope, 2nd Earl Stanhope of Great Britain (d. 1786)
- August 18 – Landgravine Caroline of Hesse-Rotenburg, German noble (d. 1741)
- August 23 – Hans Jacob Scheel, Norwegian general (d. 1774)
- August 28
  - Duke Anthony Ulrich of Brunswick, Russian general (d. 1774)
  - Jean-Baptiste Descamps, Flemish painter and art historian (d. 1791)
- August 29 – Princess Friederike Luise of Prussia, Prussian princess (d. 1784)
- September 1 – Samuel Martin (Secretary to the Treasury), British politician (d. 1788)
- September 10 – Niccolò Jommelli, Italian composer (d. 1774)
- September 17 – Gottlieb Rabener, German writer of prose satires (d. 1771)
- September 19 – Charles Humphreys, miller and statesman from Haverford Township, Pennsylvania (d. 1786)
- September 23 – Eugene Jean, Count of Soissons, Prince of Savoy (d. 1734)
- September 24 – Alaungpaya, King of Burma (d. 1760)
- September 29
  - Petrus Albertus van der Parra, Dutch colonial governor (d. 1775)
  - Johann Joachim Schwabe, German poet (d. 1784)
- September 30 – Étienne Bonnot de Condillac, French academic (d. 1780)
- October 1
  - Georg David Anthon, Danish architect (d. 1781)
  - António of Braganza, Child of Palhavã, Portuguese nobleman (d. 1800)
- October 3 – Joseph Spencer, American general (d. 1789)
- October 14 – Christoph Anton Migazzi, Austrian Catholic bishop (d. 1803)
- October 16 – Giovanni Arduino (geologist), Italian geologist (d. 1795)
- October 19 – Joseph von Petrasch, German philologist (d. 1772)
- October 25 – James Burnett, Lord Monboddo, Scottish judge, scholar of language evolution and philosopher (d. 1799)
- October 26 – Princess Marie Victoire d'Arenberg, Margravine of Baden-Baden as consort of Augustus George (d. 1793)
- October 27 – Fernando de Silva, 12th Duke of Alba, Spanish duke (d. 1776)
- October 31 – Hedvig Taube, Swedish courtier (d. 1744)
- November 1 – Johann Joachim Spalding, German theologian (d. 1804)
- November 2 – Camillo Almici, Italian priest (d. 1779)
- November 3 – Anica Bošković, Ragusan writer (d. 1804)
- November 4 – John Boyle, 3rd Earl of Glasgow, Scottish nobleman (d. 1775)
- November 10 – Mathieu Tillet, French botanist (d. 1791)
- November 18 – William Shenstone, English poet and landscape gardener (d. 1763)
- November 24 – Thomas Zebrowski, Lithuanian Jesuit scientist (d. 1758)
- November 26 – Pierre-François Brice, French artist (d. 1794)
- November 27 – Jean Philippe Goujon de Grondel, French general (d. 1807)
- December 1 – Pierre Gaultier de La Vérendrye, French-Canadian explorer (d. 1755)
- December 3 – Edward Pickard, British minister (d. 1778)
- December 4 – Israel Acrelius, Swedish missionary and clergyman (d. 1800)
- December 14 – Leonard Lispenard, American politician (d. 1790)
- December 15 – Étienne Mignot de Montigny, French engineer, geographer (d. 1782)
- December 16 – George Whitefield, English Anglican priest (d. 1770)
- December 18
  - Philippine Élisabeth d'Orléans, French princess (d. 1734)
  - Nikolaus I, Prince Esterházy, Hungarian prince (d. 1790)
- December 19 – John Winthrop (educator), 2nd Hollis Professor of Mathematics and Natural Philosophy in Harvard College (d. 1779)
- December 21
  - John Bradstreet, British Army officer during King George's War (d. 1774)
  - Paschen von Cossel, German lawyer (d. 1805)
- December 23
  - Ranieri de' Calzabigi, Italian poet and librettist (d. 1795)
  - William Howard, Viscount Andover, British MP (d. 1756)
- December 31
  - Michel Ferdinand d'Albert d'Ailly, French astronomer (d. 1769)
  - Arima Yoriyuki, Japanese daimyō (d. 1783)

1715

- January 9 – Robert-François Damiens, French domestic servant, executed for the attempted assassination of Louis XV of France (d. 1757)
- January 10
  - Christian August Crusius, German philosopher, Protestant theologian (d. 1775)
  - Johan Sparre af Söfdeborg, Swedish general, nobleman (d. 1791)
- January 12 – Jacques Duphly, French composer (d. 1789)
- January 23 – Jean-Olivier Briand, French-born Catholic bishop of Quebec (d. 1794)
- January 24 – Ōkubo Tadaoki, Japanese daimyō (d. 1764)
- January 25
  - George Hay, British politician (d. 1778)
  - Thomas Walker, distinguished Virginia physician, explorer (d. 1794)
- January 29 – Georg Christoph Wagenseil, Austrian composer (d. 1777)
- January 30 – Jean-Baptiste Lestiboudois, French botanist (d. 1804)
- January 31
  - Giovanni Fagnano, Italian mathematician (d. 1797)
  - John Wayles, American lawyer and planter (d. 1773)
- February 4 – John Hamilton, British politician (d. 1796)
- February 5 – Baltazar Adam Krčelić, Croatian historian and theologian (d. 1778)
- February 11 – Margaret Bentinck, Duchess of Portland, British duchess (d. 1785)
- February 12 – James Grenville, British Member of Parliament (d. 1783)

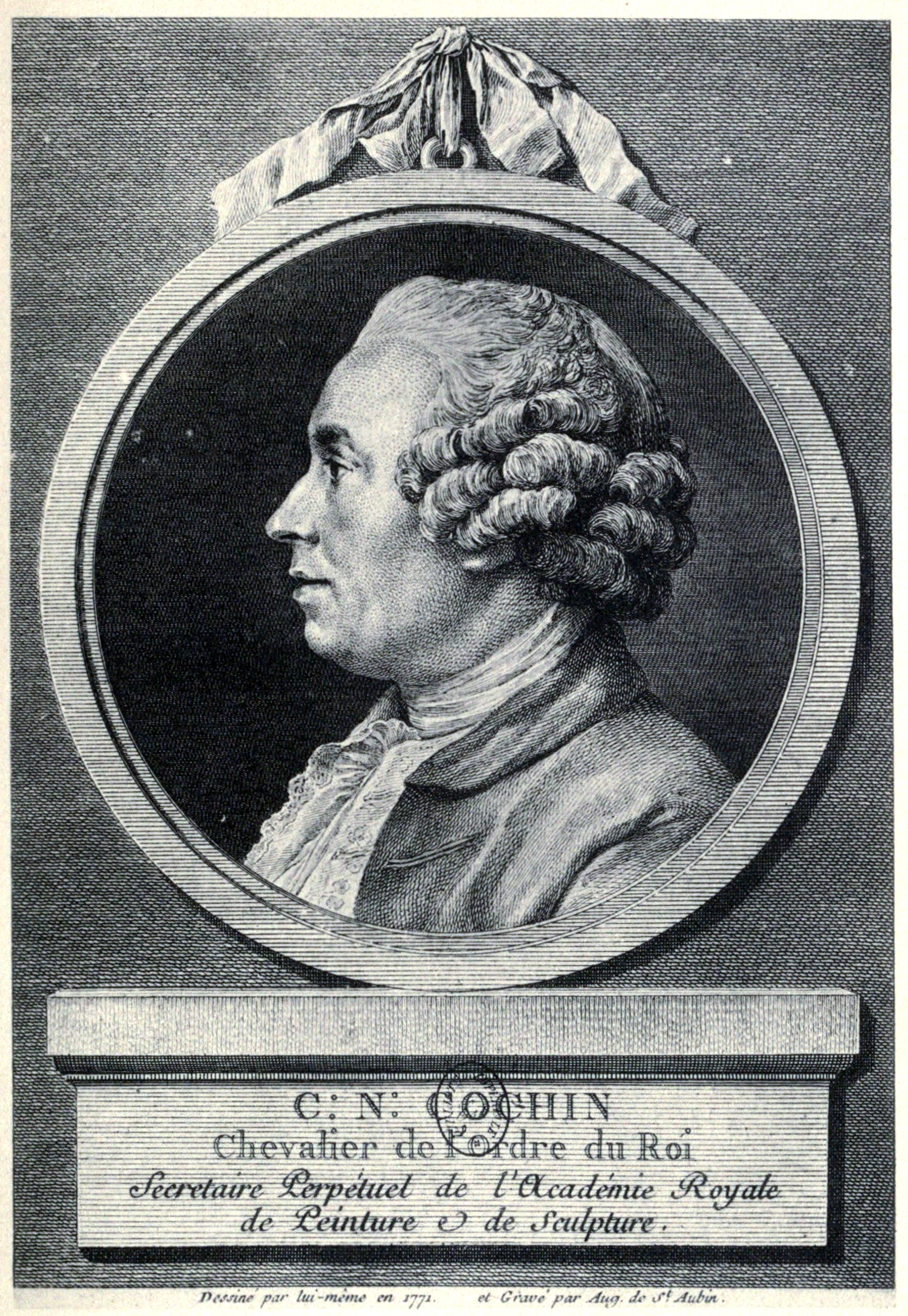
Charles-Nicolas Cochin

- February 22
  - Charles-Nicolas Cochin, French artist (d. 1790)
  - Jean Georges Lefranc de Pompignan, Roman Catholic archbishop (d. 1790)

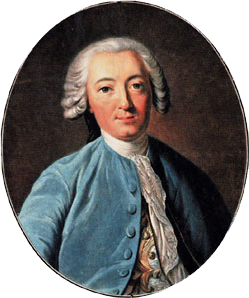
Claude Adrien Helvétius

- February 26 – Claude Adrien Helvétius, French philosopher (d. 1771)
- February 27 – Mateo Aimerich, Spanish philologist (d. 1799)
- March 4 – James Waldegrave, 2nd Earl Waldegrave of Great Britain (d. 1763)
- March 7
  - Ewald Christian von Kleist, German poet and officer (d. 1759)
  - Ephraim Williams, English benefactor of Williams College, soldier in the French and Indian War (d. 1755)
- March 14 – Johan Martin Preisler, German artist (d. 1794)
- March 18 – John Bushell, first (Massachusetts-born) Canadian printer (d. 1761)
- March 24 – William Strahan, British politician (d. 1785)
- March 25 – Mary Frances of the Five Wounds, Italian Franciscan saint (d. 1791)
- March 28 – Margrave Frederick William of Brandenburg-Schwedt, Prussian major general and titular Margrave of Brandenburg-Schwedt (d. 1744)
- March 31 – Johan Samuel Augustin, German-Danish astronomical writer, civil servant (d. 1785)
- April 3 – William Watson, English scientist (d. 1787)
- April 9 – Giovanni Carlo Boschi, Italian Catholic cardinal (d. 1788)
- April 11
  - John Alcock, English composer and organist (d. 1806)
  - Jacob Rodrigues Pereira, academic, first teacher of deaf-mutes in France (d. 1780)
- April 13 – John Martin Mack, American missionary (d. 1784)
- April 19 – James Nares, English composer of mostly sacred vocal works (d. 1783)
- April 20
  - James Brudenell, 5th Earl of Cardigan, English noble and politician (d. 1811)
  - Saliha Sultan, daughter of Ottoman Sultan (d. 1778)
- April 23
  - Johann Friedrich Doles, German composer (d. 1797)
  - John Hicks, Canadian politician (d. 1790)
  - Auguste de Keralio, French nobleman (d. 1805)
  - Carl Tersmeden, Swedish admiral (d. 1797)
- April 28
  - Carl Fredrik Scheffer, Swedish politician (d. 1786)
  - Franz Sparry, Austrian composer (d. 1767)
- May 4
  - Richard Graves, English minister (d. 1804)
  - Hieronim Florian Radziwiłł, Polish-Lithuanian noble (d. 1760)
- May 7 – Charles Roe, English businessman (d. 1781)
- May 11
  - Johann Gottfried Bernhard Bach, fourth child of Johann Sebastian Bach and Maria Barbara Bach to reach adulthood (d. 1739)
  - Ignazio Fiorillo, Italian composer (d. 1787)
- May 12 – Otto William Schwartz, Canadian politician (d. 1785)
- May 20 – William Whitfield II, American Army officer (d. 1795)
- May 22 – François-Joachim de Pierre de Bernis, French cardinal and statesman (d. 1794)
- June 7 – Lodewijk Caspar Valckenaer, Dutch classical scholar (d. 1785)
- June 12
  - Nicolas Thyrel de Boismont, French abbot (d. 1786)
  - Charles-René Dejordy de Villebon, French-Canadian explorer (d. 1761)
- June 13 – Anna Wilhelmine of Anhalt-Dessau, German noblewoman (d. 1780)
- June 15 – John Blennerhassett, Anglo-Irish politician (d. 1763)
- June 18 – Harry Grey, 4th Earl of Stamford, British earl, politician (d. 1768)
- June 25 – Joseph Foullon de Doué, French politician and a Controller-General of Finances under Louis XVI (d. 1789)
- June 29 – Pedro Antonio de Cevallos, Spanish military Governor of Buenos Aires between 1757 and 1766 (d. 1778)
- July 2 – Samuel Finley, American clergyman and educator (d. 1766)
- July 4
  - Christian Fürchtegott Gellert, German author (d. 1769)
  - Charles François Hutin, French painter (d. 1776)
- July 11 – Jean-Joseph Balechou, French artist (d. 1765)
- July 14 – Caterina Sagredo Barbarigo, Venetian aristocrat and salon holder (d. 1772)
- July 16 – Charles, Prince of Soubise, Marshal of France (d. 1787)
- July 17 – Fredericka of Saxe-Gotha-Altenburg, German noblewoman member of the House of Wettin and by marriage Duchess of Saxe-Weissenfels (d. 1775)
- July 26 – Jakob van der Schley, Dutch engraver (d. 1779)
- August 5 – Charlotte Sophie of Aldenburg, German sovereign (d. 1800)
- August 6 – Luc de Clapiers, marquis de Vauvenargues, French writer (d. 1747)
- August 18 – Cyrus Trapaud, British Army general (d. 1801)
- August 25 – Luis González Velázquez, Spanish painter (d. 1763)
- September 5 – Ignác Raab, Czech artist (d. 1787)
- September 15 – Jean-Baptiste Vaquette de Gribeauval, French artillery officer and engineer who revolutionized French cannon (d. 1789)
- September 19
  - Emmanuel-Félicité de Durfort de Duras, Marshal of France, politician (d. 1789)
  - Ferenc Esterházy, Hungarian politician (d. 1785)
- September 22 – Jean-Étienne Guettard, French scientist (d. 1786)
- September 25 – Princess Victoria Charlotte of Anhalt-Zeitz-Hoym, Margravine of Brandenburg-Bayreuth (d. 1772)
- September 26 – Lord George Graham, Royal Navy officer and MP (d. 1747)
- October 1 – Richard Jago, English clergyman poet and minor landscape gardener from Warwickshire (d. 1781)
- October 2 – Domenico Caracciolo, Italian politician (d. 1789)
- October 5
  - John Hustler, English Quaker industrialist (d. 1790)
  - Victor de Riqueti, marquis de Mirabeau, French economist of the Physiocratic school (d. 1789)
- October 6 – Antoine-Gabriel-François Benoist, soldier in the French army, served in North America (d. 1776)
- October 16 – Joseph Allegranza, Historian, archaeologist, antiquary (d. 1785)
- October 23 – Peter II of Russia, Emperor of Russia (d. 1730)
- October 29 – Aaron Cleveland, American clergyman (d. 1757)
- November 5
  - John Brown, English divine and author (d. 1766)
  - Felix of Nicosia, Cypriot Catholic saint (d. 1787)
  - Johann Georg Wille, German engraver (d. 1808)
- November 6 – Heneage Finch, 3rd Earl of Aylesford, Member of the Parliament of Great Britain (d. 1777)

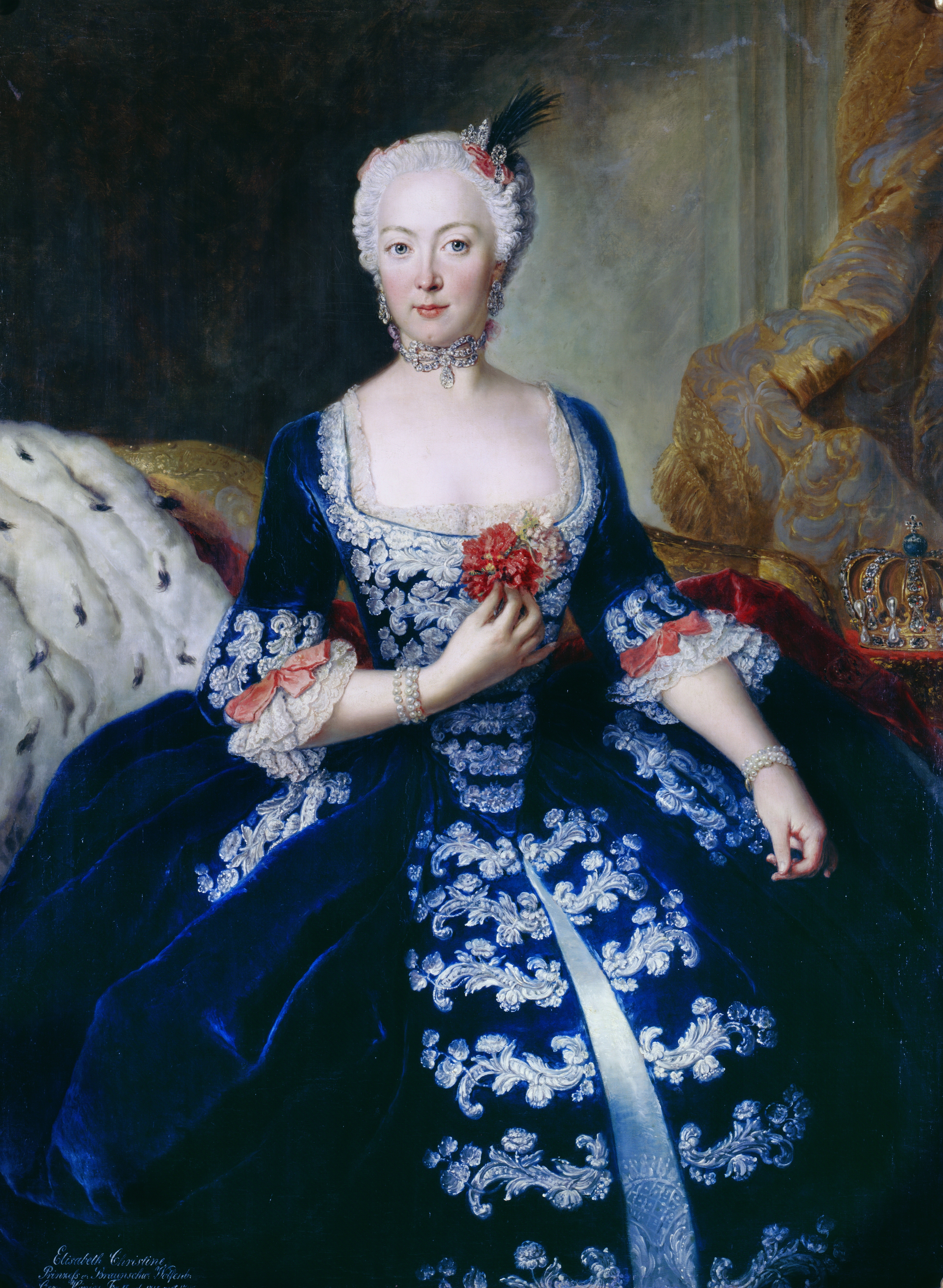
Queen Elisabeth Christine

- November 8 – Elisabeth Christine of Brunswick-Wolfenbüttel-Bevern, Crown Princess of Prussia (d. 1797)
- November 9 – Edward Bligh, 2nd Earl of Darnley, British noble (d. 1747)
- November 12 – Kajetan Sołtyk, Polish Catholic priest (d. 1788)
- November 13 – Dorothea Erxleben, first German female physician (d. 1762)
- November 16 – Girolamo Abos, Maltese-Italian composer (d. 1760)
- November 17 – Sir Danvers Osborn, 3rd Baronet, British politician and colonial governor (d. 1753)
- November 19 – Bertrand Philip, Count of Gronsveld, Dutch diplomat (d. 1772)
- November 20 – Pierre Charles Le Monnier, French astronomer (d. 1799)
- November 24 – Anna Nitschmann, German poet (d. 1760)
- November 26 – Jean-Charles Gervaise de Latouche, French writer (d. 1782)
- November 27 – Johann Gottlob Leidenfrost, German physician (d. 1794)
- November 30
  - Johann Philipp Bethmann, German merchant and banker (d. 1793)
  - Johan Jacob Bruun, Danish artist (d. 1789)
- December 4 – Abraham Drake, New Hampshire politician (d. 1781)
- December 9 – Joseph Marie Terray, Controller-General of Finances during the reign of Louis XV of France (d. 1778)
- December 11 – Johann Valentin Tischbein, German painter (d. 1768)
- December 12 – Gennaro Manna, Italian composer (d. 1779)
- December 18 – Johan Heinrich Becker, German physician and chemist who settled in Norway (d. 1761)
- December 21
  - Tommaso Gherardini, Italian painter (d. 1797)
  - Gottlieb Heinrich Totleben, German noble (d. 1773)
  - François-Vincent Toussaint, French writer most famous for Les Mœurs (The Manners) (d. 1772)
- December 27 – Philippe de Noailles, Marshal of France (d. 1794)
- December 30 – Thomas Watson, 3rd Earl of Rockingham, British politician (d. 1746)
- December 31 – Nicolas-Sylvestre Bergier, French Catholic theologian (d. 1790)

1716 * January 1 – Joshua Loring, colonial American captain in British service (d. 1781), Gaspar de Portola, Spanish California Expedition (d.1786)

- January 4 – Aaron Burr Sr., President of Princeton University (d. 1757)
- January 11 – Edmund Sheffield, 2nd Duke of Buckingham and Normanby, English nobleman (d. 1735)
- January 12 – Antonio de Ulloa, Spanish general and scientist (d. 1795)
- January 15
  - Philip Livingston, American politician (d. 1778)
  - Pierre-Marie-Jérôme Trésaguet, French scientist (d. 1796)

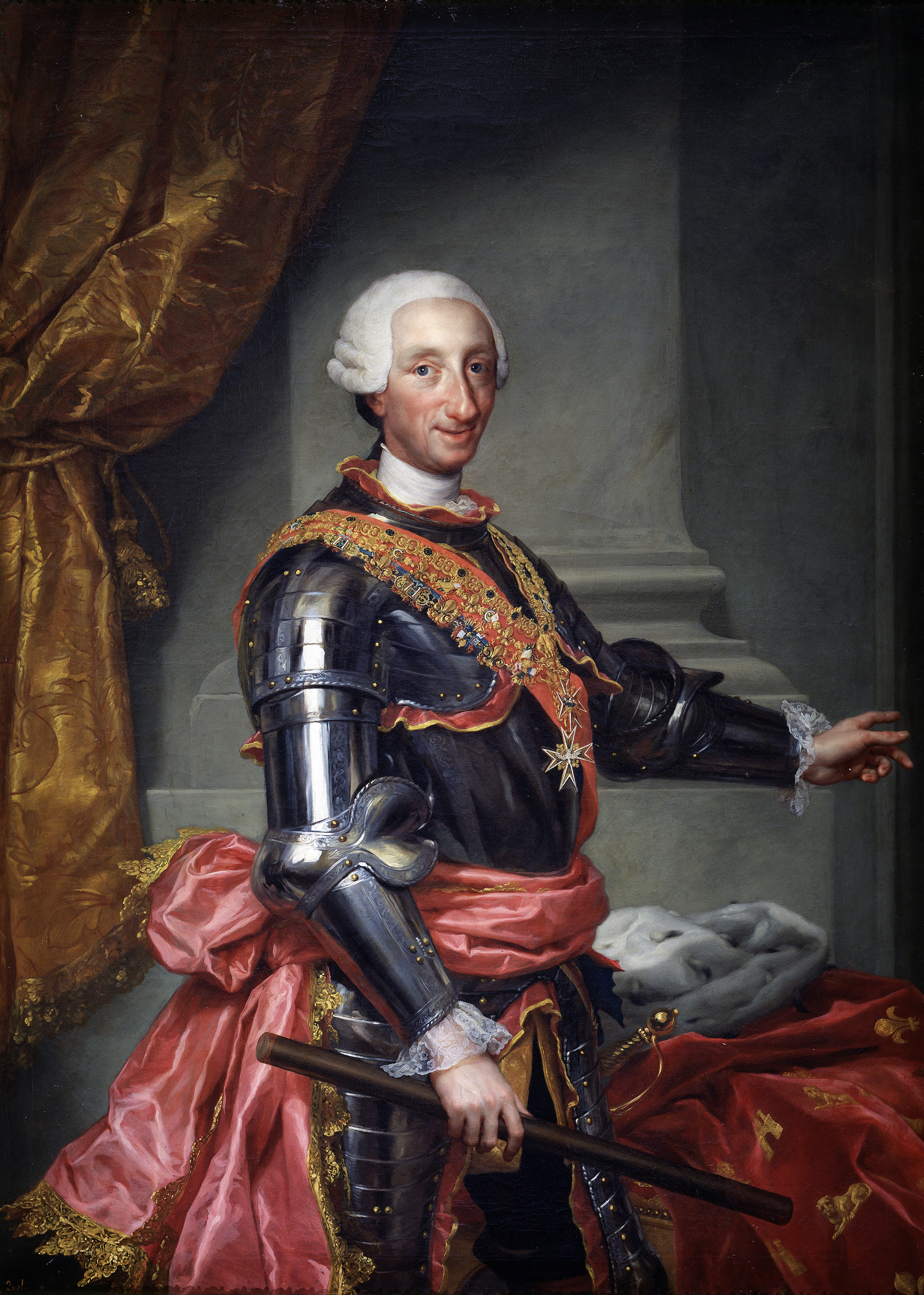
Charles III of Spain

- January 20
  - King Charles III of Spain (d. 1788)
  - Jean-Jacques Barthélemy, French writer and numismatist (d. 1795)
  - Franz Wilhelm Rabaliatti, German architect (d. 1782)
- January 26 – George Germain, 1st Viscount Sackville, British Army general (d. 1785)
- January 30 – Carl Fredrik Adelcrantz, Swedish architect and civil servant (d. 1796)
- February 2 – David Graeme, British Army general (d. 1797)
- February 4 – José Solís Folch de Cardona, Spanish colonial governor (d. 1770)
- February 8 – Pasquale Cafaro, Italian composer (d. 1787)
- February 9 – Mary Palmer, English writer (d. 1794)
- February 23 – Antoine-Joseph Pernety, French writer (d. 1796)
- March 6 – Pehr Kalm, Finnish scientist (d. 1779)
- March 13 – Princess Philippine Charlotte of Prussia (d. 1801)
- March 18 – Friedrich Wilhelm, Graf von Wylich und Lottum, Prussian army officer (d. 1774)
- March 19 – Guillaume Coustou the Younger, French artist (d. 1777)
- March 21 – Josef Seger, Czech composer and organist (d. 1782)
- April 1 – Morgan Rhys, Welsh hymn-writer (d. 1779)
- April 5 – Jeremiah Theus, American artist (d. 1774)
- April 12 – Felice Giardini, Italian composer, violinist (d. 1796)
- April 24 – Johann Georg Weishaupt, German lawyer (d. 1753)
- May 2 – Infante Carlos of Portugal, Portuguese infante (prince) (d. 1736)
- May 8 – James Wright, Governor of Georgia (d. 1785)
- May 20 – Friedrich Samuel Bock, German philosopher and theologian (d. 1785)
- May 24 – Constantine, Landgrave of Hesse-Rotenburg (d. 1778)
- May 28 – Sir Robert Burdett, 4th Baronet, British politician and member of the English gentry (d. 1797)
- May 29 – Louis-Jean-Marie Daubenton, French scientist (d. 1799)
- June 10 – Carl Gustaf Ekeberg, Swedish explorer (d. 1784)
- June 18
  - Charles Edzard, Prince of East Frisia (d. 1744)
  - Joseph-Marie Vien, French painter (d. 1809)
- June 23 – Fletcher Norton, 1st Baron Grantley (d. 1789)
- June 25 – Johann Baptist Babel, Swiss sculptor (d. 1799)
- June 26 – Charles-Nicolas d'Oultremont, Roman Catholic bishop (d. 1771)
- June 27 – Louise Diane d'Orléans, last child of Philippe II, Duke of Orleans (d. 1736)
- July 3 – Philipp Gotthard von Schaffgotsch, German Prince-Bishop (d. 1795)
- July 14 – Michael Schlatter, American clergyman (d. 1790)
- July 17 – William Errington, English priest (d. 1768)
- July 22 – Jan Jakub Zamoyski, Polish noble (d. 1790)
- August 2 – Richard Edgcumbe, 2nd Baron Edgcumbe, British baron, politician (d. 1761)
- August 4 – Sir John Dashwood-King, 3rd Baronet, English country gentleman (d. 1793)
- August 8
  - Andrea Spagni, Italian theologian (d. 1788)
  - Thomas Foley, 1st Baron Foley, British politician (d. 1777)
- August 15 – Karl Joseph von Firmian, Austrian diplomat (d. 1782)
- August 18 – Johan Maurits Mohr, Dutch-German pastor and astronomer (d. 1775)

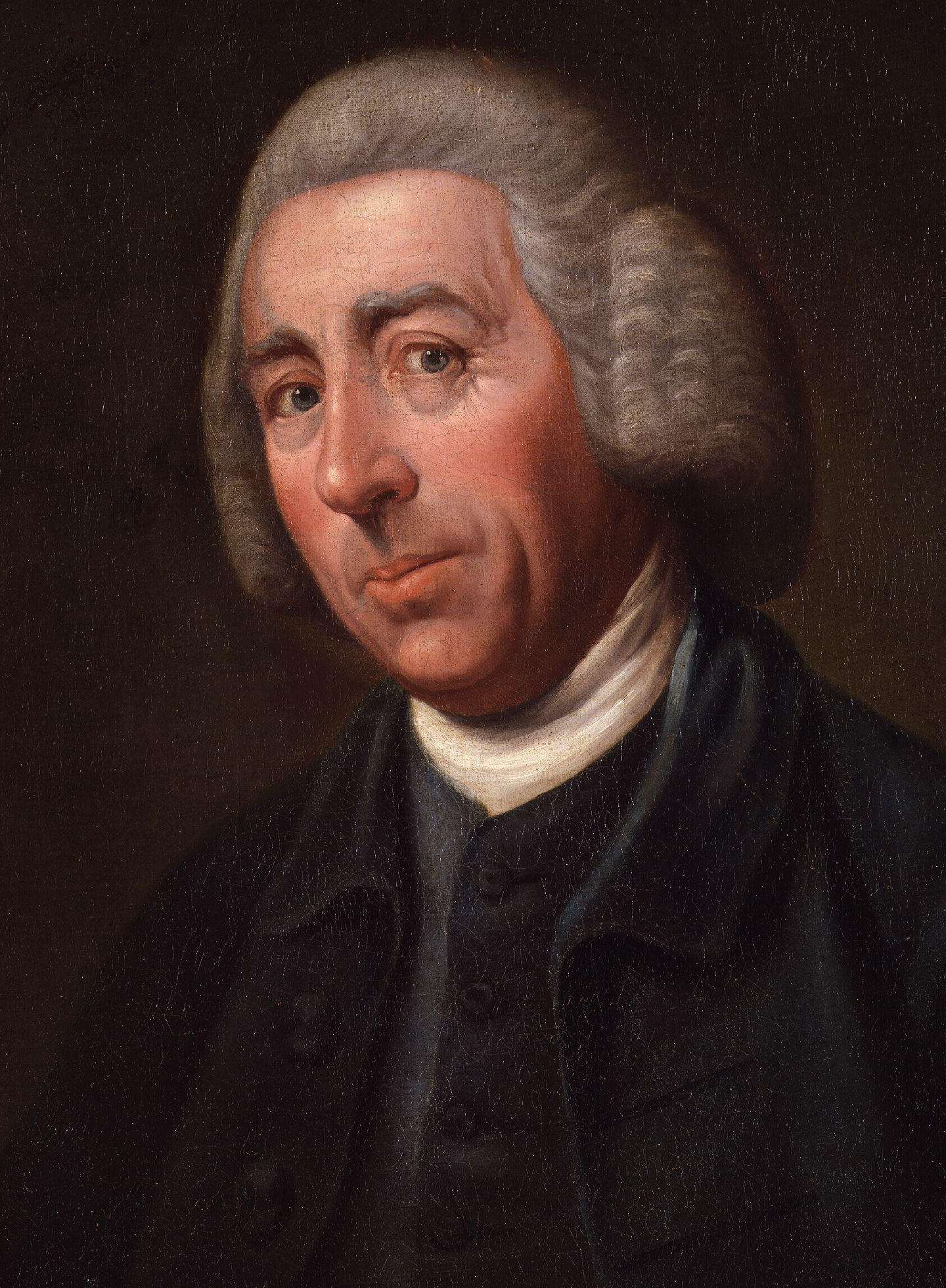
Lancelot Brown

- August 30 – Capability Brown, English landscape architect (d. 1783)
- September 2 – Jacques-Nicolas Tardieu, French engraver (d. 1791)
- September 6 – Charles Bennet, 3rd Earl of Tankerville, British Earl (d. 1767)
- September 16 – Angelo Maria Amorevoli, Italian musician (d. 1798)
- September 19 – Jan Jacob Schultens, Dutch linguist (d. 1788)
- October 1 – Benjamin Waller, American politician (d. 1786)
- October 3 – Giovanni Battista Beccaria, Italian physicist (d. 1781)
- October 4 – James Lind, Scottish physician (d. 1794)
- October 5 – Alexei Senyavin, Russian admiral (d. 1797)
- October 6 – George Montagu-Dunk, 2nd Earl of Halifax, British statesman (d. 1771)
- October 8 – Gaspar of Braganza, Archbishop of Braga, Portuguese clergyman (d. 1780)
- October 16 – Lord Augustus FitzRoy, Royal Navy officer during the War of the Austrian Succession (d. 1741)
- October 26 – Charles Christian Erdmann, Duke of Württemberg-Oels (d. 1792)
- November 1
  - William Foye, Canadian politician (d. 1771)
  - Joseph Dinouart, French preacher (d. 1786)
- November 4 – Wilhelm von Knyphausen, Prussian soldier (d. 1800)
- November 16 – John Monro, British physician of Bethlem Hospital (d. 1791)
- November 26 – Elizabeth Percy, Duchess of Northumberland, British duchess; Lady of the Bedchamber (d. 1776)
- December 1 – Étienne Maurice Falconet, French artist (d. 1791)
- December 7 – Henry Ernest of Stolberg-Wernigerode, German politician, canon, provost and author of numerous hymns (d. 1778)
- December 12 – Leopoldine Marie of Anhalt-Dessau, Margravine of Brandenburg-Schwedt (d. 1782)
- December 16
  - Johann Rudolf Tschiffeli, Swiss agronomist (d. 1780)
  - Louis Jules Mancini Mazarini, French diplomat and writer (d. 1798)
- December 23 – Johann Heinrich Rolle, German baroque composer (d. 1785)
- December 25 – Johann Jakob Reiske, German scholar (d. 1774)
- December 26
  - Thomas Gray, English poet, historian (d. 1771)
  - Jean François de Saint-Lambert, French poet, philosopher and military officer (d. 1803)
- December 27 – Leonardo Ximenes, Italian mathematician (d. 1786)
- Arnarsaq, Inuit translator, interpreter and missionary (d. after 1771)
- Catherine Théot, French visionary (d. 1794)
- Anna Margareta Salmelin, Finnish prisoner of war (d. 1789)
- Josip Kazimir Drašković, Croatian General in the Seven Years' War (1756–1763) (d. 1765)

1717

- January 2 – Edward Seymour, 9th Duke of Somerset, English nobleman, son of Edward Seymour, 8th Duke of Somerset and Mary Webb (d. 1792)
- January 5 – William Barrington, 2nd Viscount Barrington, English statesman (d. 1793)
- January 18 – Jean-François-Marie de Surville, French trader and navigator (d. 1770)
- January 21 – Antonio María de Bucareli y Ursúa, Spanish military officer (d. 1779)
- January 23 – Benjamin Beddome, English Baptist minister and hymnist (d. 1795)
- January 28 – Mustafa III, Ottoman Sultan (d. 1773)
- January 29 – Jeffrey Amherst, 1st Baron Amherst, British soldier and conqueror of Quebec (d. 1797)
- February 2 – Ernst Gideon Freiherr von Laudon, Austrian field marshal (d. 1790)
- February 3 – Nicholas Cooke, first Governor of Rhode Island (d. 1782)
- c. February 11 – William Williams Pantycelyn, Welsh hymn-writer, a key leader of the 18th century Methodist revival (d. 1791)
- February 17 – Adam Friedrich Oeser, German etcher (d. 1799)
- February 19 – David Garrick, English actor (d. 1779)
- February 27 – Johann David Michaelis, German biblical scholar and teacher (d. 1791)
- April 6 – Luis de Unzaga, American-Spanish governor (d. 1793)
- April – Pieter Barbiers, Dutch artist (d. 1780)
- April 9 – Georg Matthias Monn, Austrian composer (d. 1750)
- April 10 – Isaac de Pinto, Dutch Jew of Portuguese origin, investor and scholar (d. 1787)
- May 8 – Charles Guillaume Le Normant d'Étiolles, French official, husband of Madame de Pompadour (d. 1799)

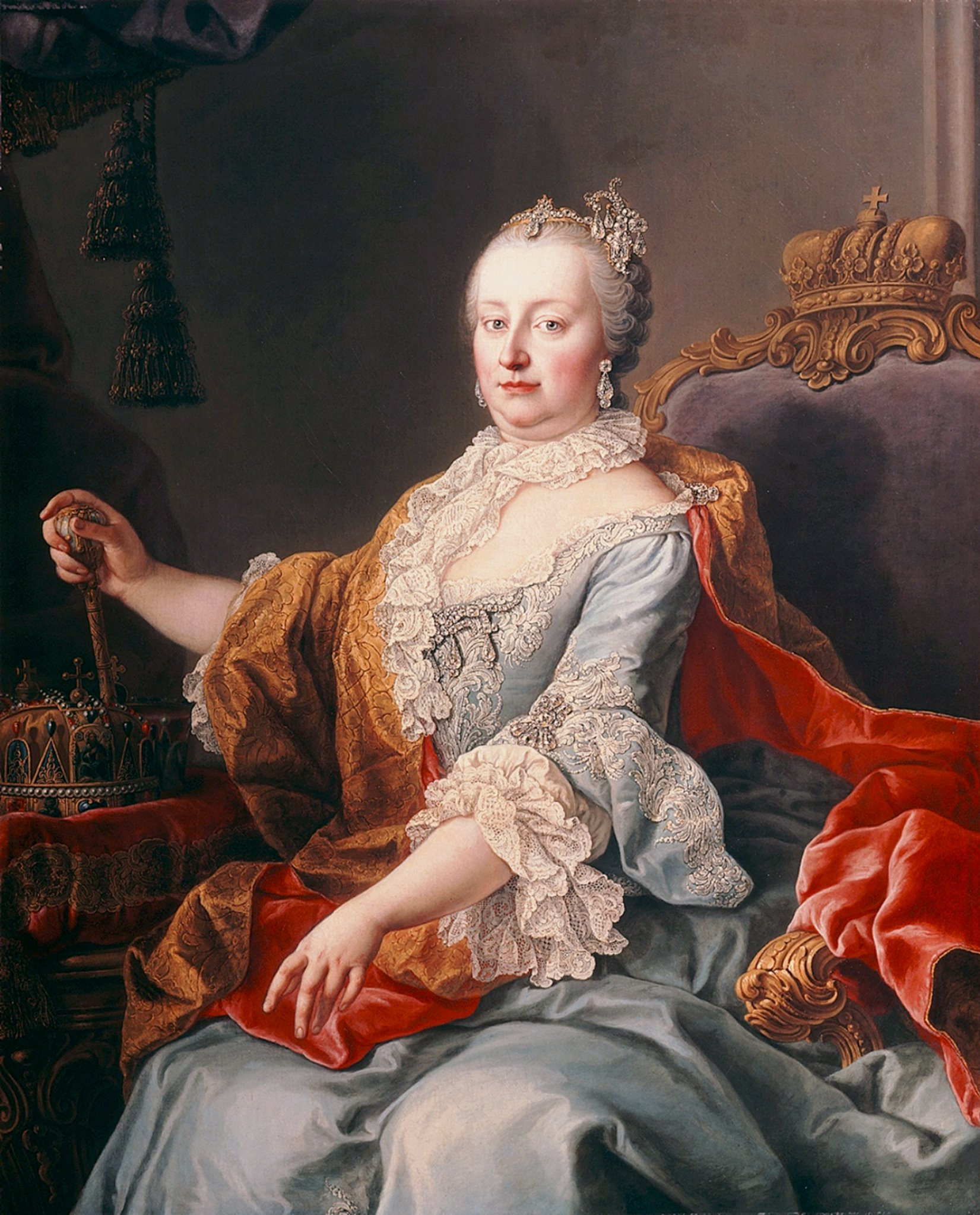
Maria Theresa of Austria

- May 13 – Maria Theresa of Austria, Archduchess of Austria and Queen of Hungary and Bohemia, consort of the Holy Roman Emperor (d. 1780)
- June 5 – Emanuel Mendes da Costa, English botanist (d. 1791)
- June 8 – John Collins, Continental Congressman, third Governor of Rhode Island (d. 1795)
- June 19 – Johann Stamitz, Czech-born composer (d. 1757)
- June 20 – Jacques Saly, French sculptor (d. 1776)
- June 27 – Louis Guillaume Lemonnier, French botanist (d. 1799)
- June 28 – Matthew Stewart, Scottish mathematician (d. 1785)
- July 5 – Peter III of Portugal, consort of Queen Maria I of Portugal (d. 1786)
- August – Sophie de Lafont, Russian educator (d. 1797)
- August 13 – Louis François, Prince of Conti, French nobleman, military leader (d. 1776)
- August 15
  - Louis Carrogis Carmontelle, French dramatist (d. 1806)
  - John Metcalf, "Blind Jack of Knaresborough", English roadbuilder (d. 1810)
- September 4 – Job Orton, English dissenting minister (d. 1783)
- September 7
  - Agui, Chinese nobleman, general for the Ch'ing dynasty (d. 1797)
  - Martin Dobrizhoffer, Austrian Jesuit missionary (d. 1791)
- September 22 – Pehr Wilhelm Wargentin, Swedish astronomer (d. 1783)
- September 24 – Horace Walpole, English art historian, man of letters, antiquarian and politician (d. 1797)
- September 28 – William Nassau de Zuylestein, 4th Earl of Rochford, British diplomat and statesman (d. 1781)
- October – James Paine, English architect (d. 1789)
- October 5 – Marie-Anne de Mailly-Nesle duchess de Châteauroux, French mistress of King Louis XV of France (d. 1744)
- October 13 – John Armstrong, American civil engineer, major general in the Revolutionary War (d. 1795)
- October 30 – Jonathan Hornblower, English pioneer of steam power (d. 1780)
- November 13 – Prince George William of Great Britain, member of the British Royal Family (d. 1718)
- November 16 – Jean le Rond d'Alembert, French mathematician and encyclopædist (d. 1783)
- November 17 – Caroline Townshend, 1st Baroness Greenwich, English peeress (d. 1794)
- November 23 – Antoine Guenée, French priest and Christian apologist (d. 1803)
- November 25 – Alexander Sumarokov, Russian poet and playwright (d. 1777)

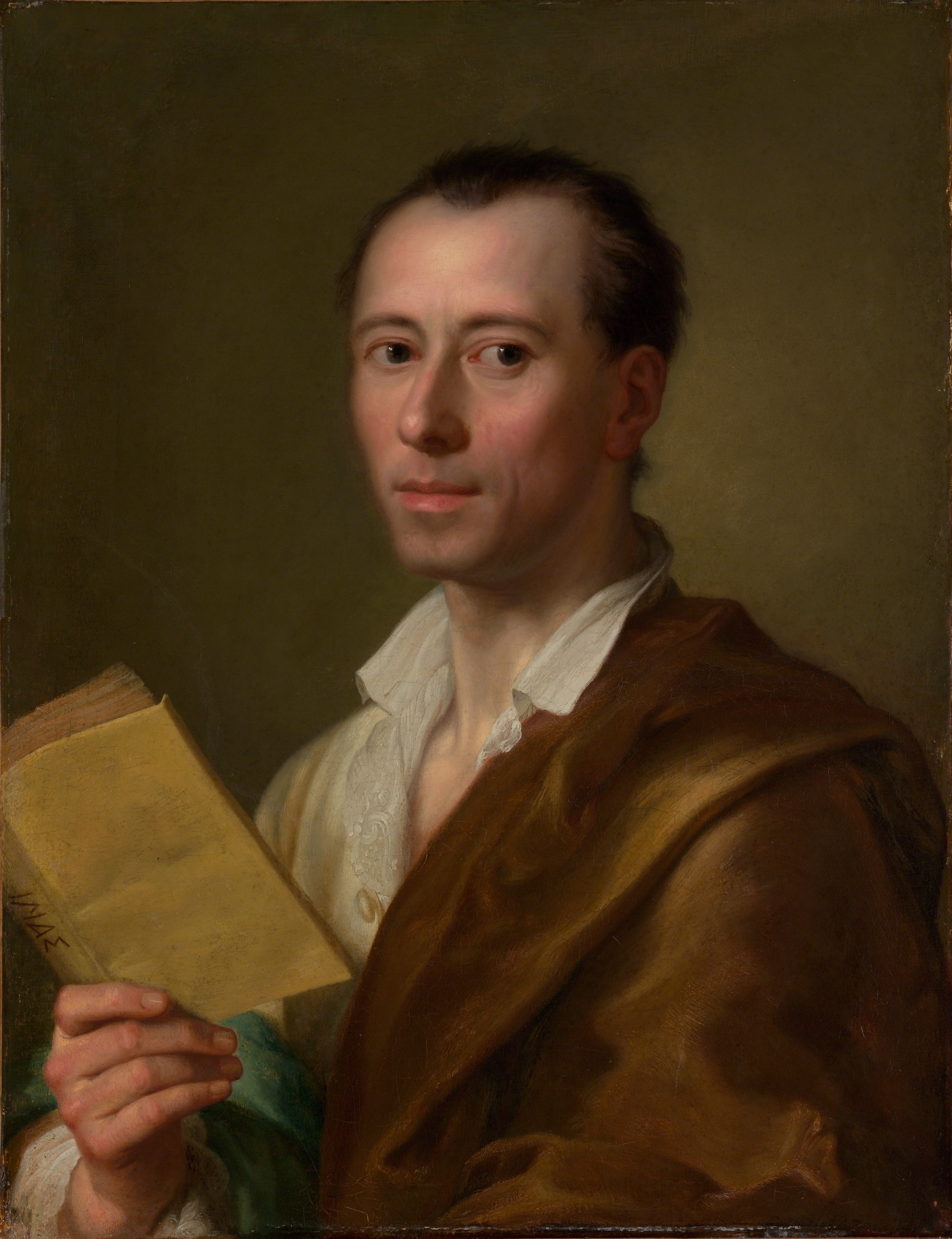
Johann Joachim Winckelmann

- December 9 – Johann Joachim Winckelmann, German classical scholar and archaeologist (d. 1768)
- December 16 – Elizabeth Carter, English writer (d. 1806)
- December 25 – George Augustus Eliott, 1st Baron Heathfield, British army officer (d. 1790)
- December 27 – Pope Pius VI, born Count Giovanni Angelo Braschi, Italian pontiff (d. 1799)
- December 28 – Johann Heinrich Gottlob Justi, leading German Kameralist in the 18th century (d. 1771)
- December 29 – Charles Gravier, comte de Vergennes, French statesman and diplomat (d. 1785)
- date unknown
  - Giambattista Almici, Italian jurist (d. 1793)
  - Claude Humbert Piarron de Chamousset, French philanthropist (d. 1773)
  - Gottlieb Sigmund Gruner, Swiss cartographer and geologist (d. 1778)
  - Elimelech of Lizhensk, Polish Orthodox Jewish rabbi, one of the great founding rebbes of Hasidic Judaism (d. 1787)
  - Henry Middleton, South Carolina plantation owner, second President of the Continental Congress (d. 1784)
  - Lewis Nicola, Irish-born officer in the American army during the American Revolutionary War (d. 1807)
  - Anne Steele ("Theodosia"), English Baptist hymn-writer (d. 1778)
  - Molla Panah Vagif, Azerbaijani poet (d. 1797)

1718

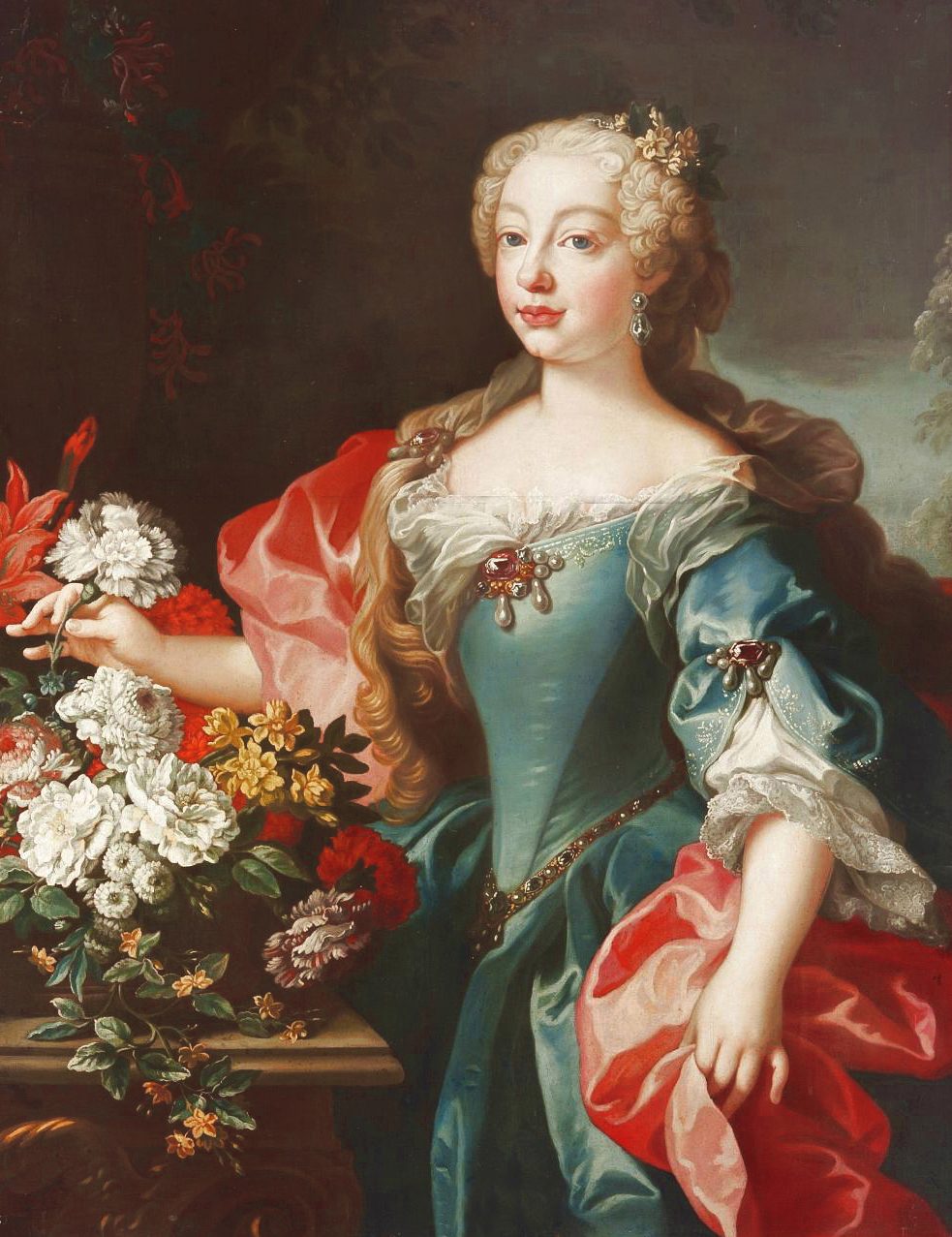
Infanta Mariana Victoria of Spain

- January 7 – Israel Putnam, American Revolutionary War general (d. 1790)
- January 29 – Paul Rabaut, French Huguenot pastor (d. 1794)
- February 17 – Matthew Tilghman, American delegate to the Continental Congress (d. 1790)
- March 31 – Infanta Mariana Victoria of Spain, queen regent of Portugal (d. 1781)
- April 4 – Benjamin Kennicott, English churchman and Hebrew scholar (d. 1783)
- April 7 – Hugh Blair, Scottish preacher and man of letters (d. 1800)
- April 20 – David Brainerd, American missionary (d. 1747)
- April 24 – Nathaniel Hone, Irish-born painter (d. 1784)
- April 26 – Esek Hopkins, American Revolutionary War admiral (d. 1802)
- April 27 – Thomas Lewis, Irish-born Virginia settler (d. 1790)
- May 16 – Maria Gaetana Agnesi, Italian mathematician (d. 1799)
- May 17 – Robert Darcy, 4th Earl of Holderness, English diplomat and politician (d. 1778)
- May 23 – William Hunter, Scottish anatomist (d. 1783)
- May 30 – Wills Hill, 1st Marquess of Downshire, English politician (d. 1793)
- May 31 – Jacob Christian Schäffer, German inventor, botanist and professor (d. 1790)
- June 5 – Thomas Chippendale, English furniture maker (d. 1779)
- June 17 – George Howard, British field marshal (d. 1796)
- July 5 – Francis Seymour-Conway, 1st Marquess of Hertford, Viceroy of Ireland (d. 1794)
- July 18 – Saverio Bettinelli, Italian writer (d. 1808)
- July 31 – John Canton, English physicist (d. 1772)
- August 11 – Frederick Haldimand, Swiss-born British colonial governor (d. 1791)
- September 18 – Nikita Ivanovich Panin, Russian statesman (d. 1783)
- October 19 – Victor-François, 2nd duc de Broglie, Marshal of France (d. 1804)
- October 2 – Louisa Catharina Harkort, German ironmaster (d. 1795)
- October 28 – Ignacije Szentmartony, Croatian Jesuit missionary and geographer (d. 1793)
- November 3 – John Montagu, 4th Earl of Sandwich, English statesman (d. 1792)
- November 28 – Hedvig Charlotta Nordenflycht, Swedish writer (d. 1763)
- date unknown
  - István Hatvani, Hungarian mathematician (d. 1786)
  - Salomée Halpir, Lithuanian oculist (year of death unknown)

1719

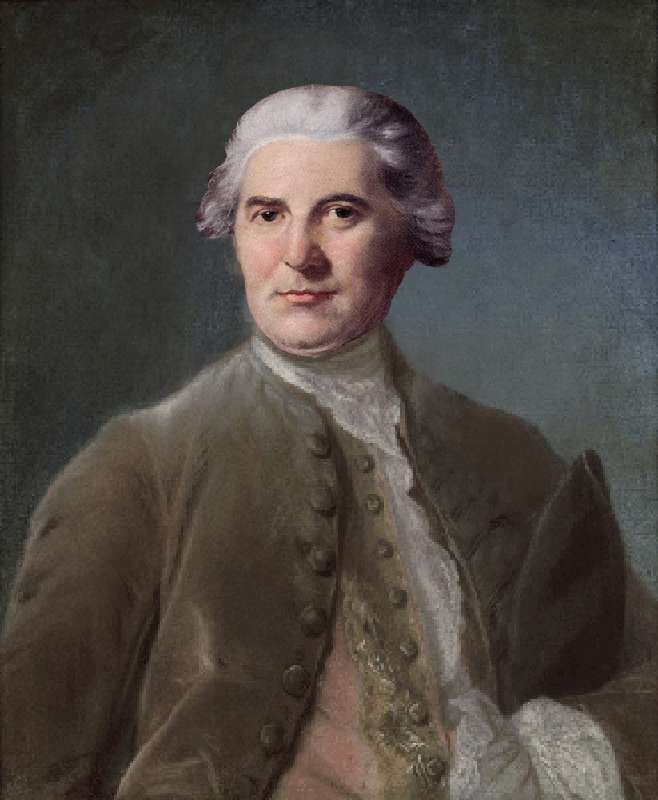
Jacques-Alexandre Laffon de Ladebat born 2 January

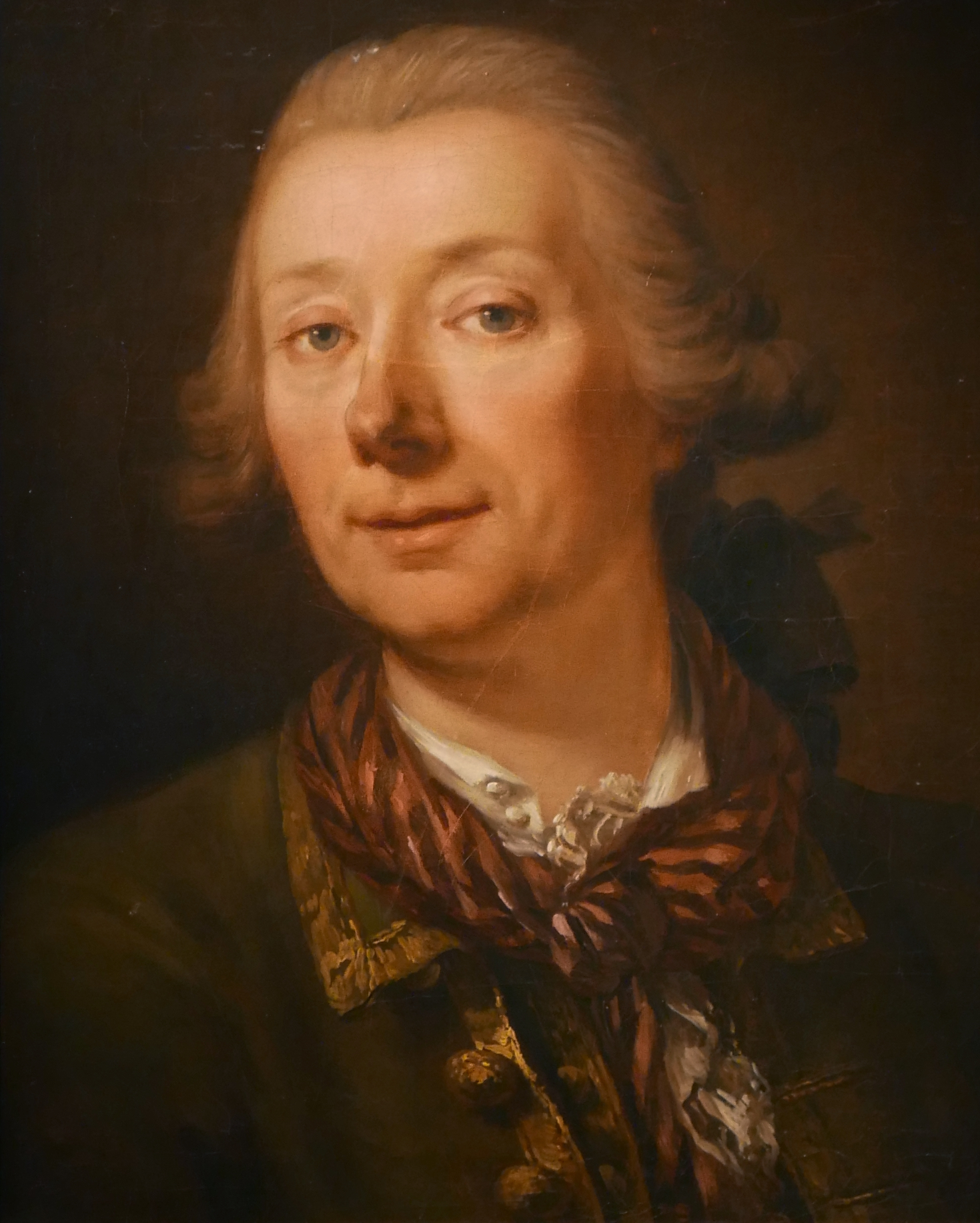
Guillaume de Barrême de Châteaufort born 6 January

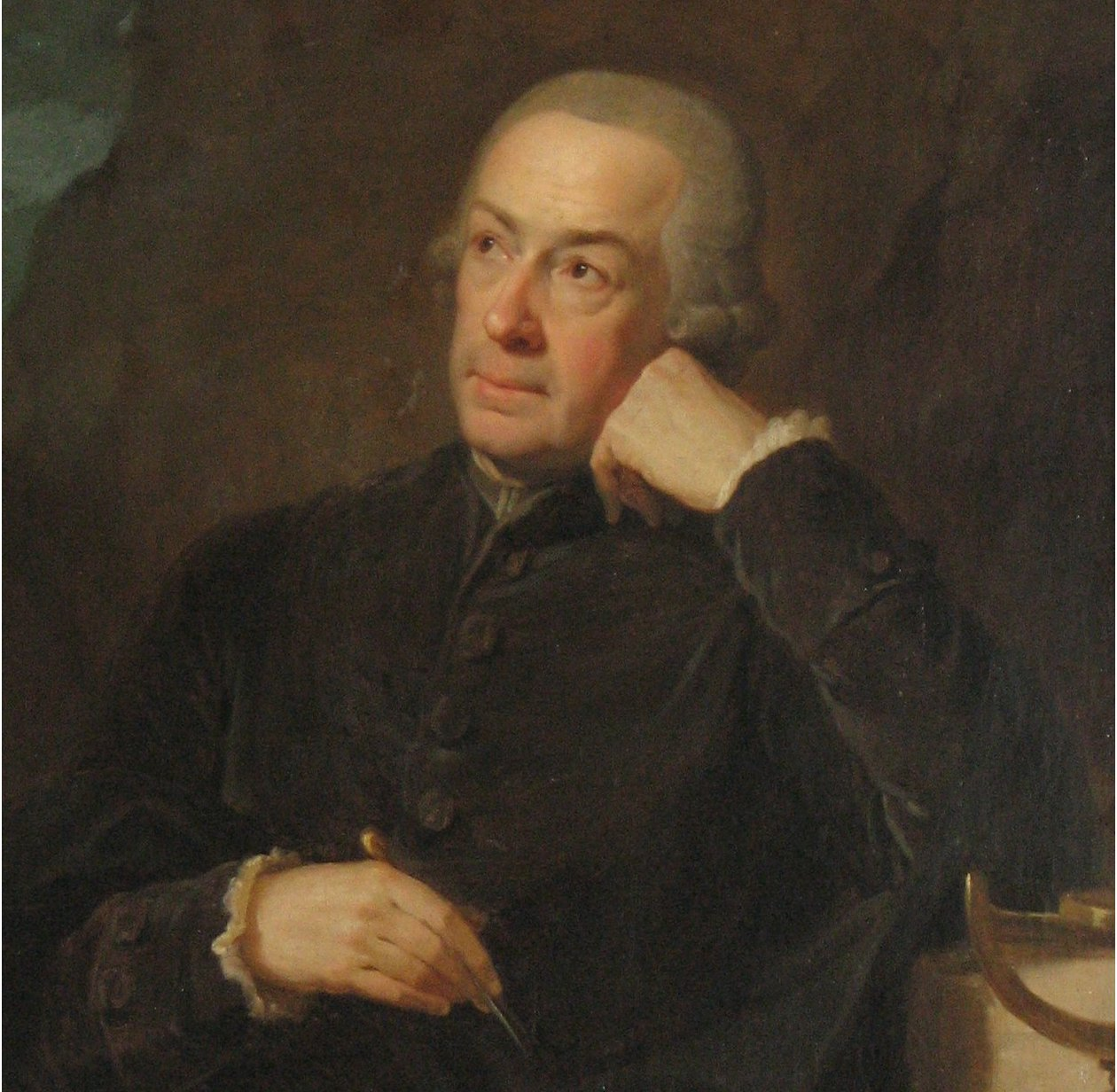
Joseph Liesganig born 13 February

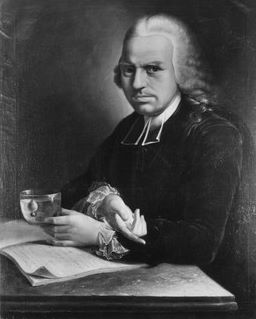
Ferdinand Christoph Oetinger born 18 February

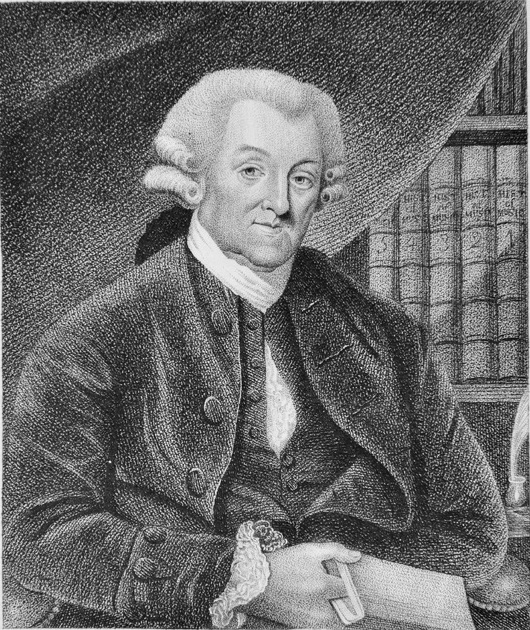
John Hawkins born 29 March

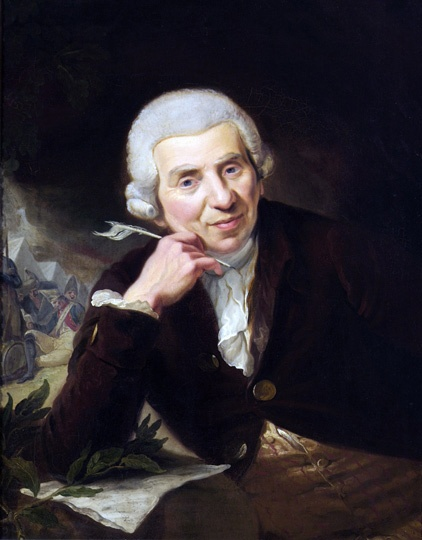
Johann Wilhelm Ludwig Gleim born 2 April

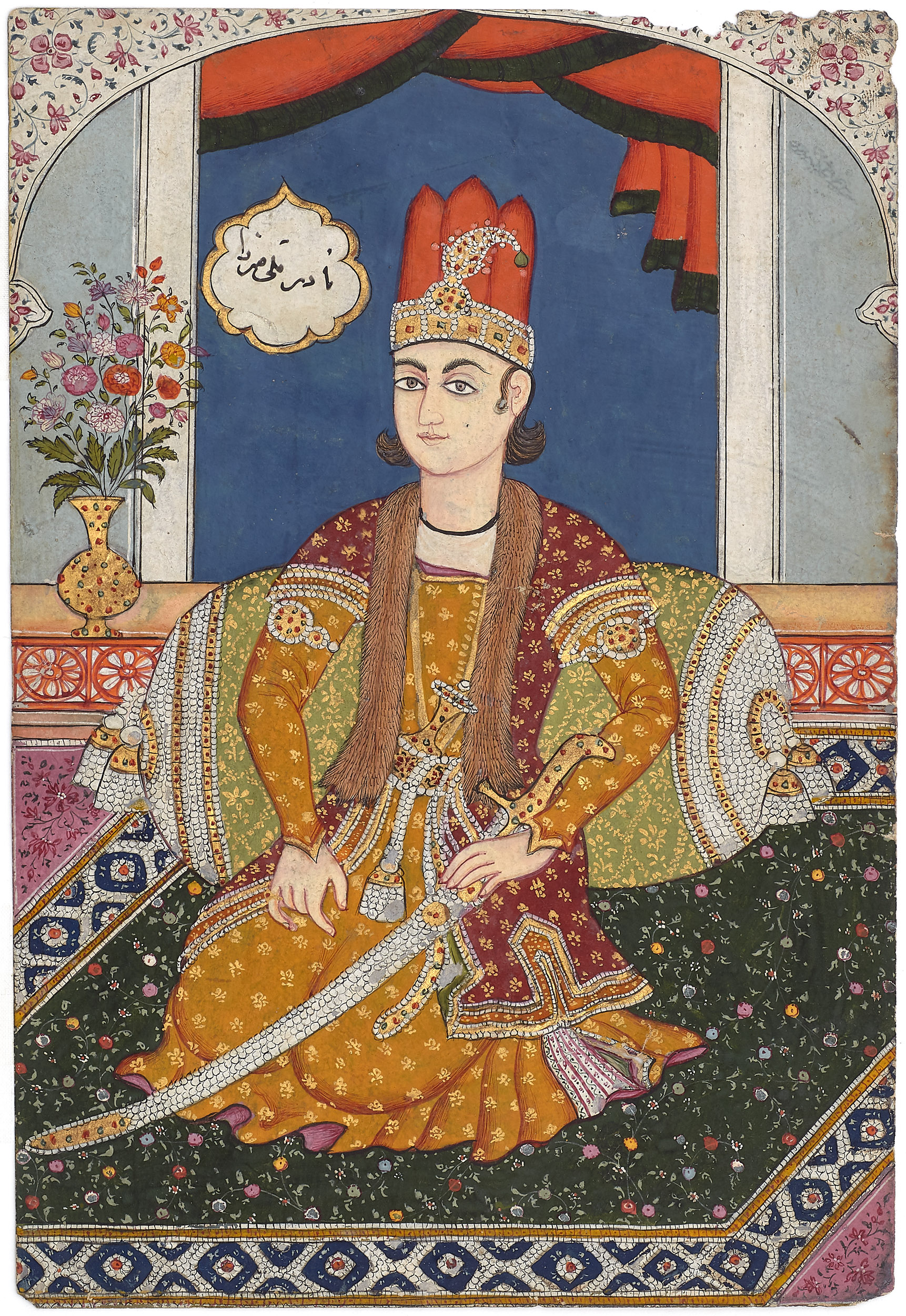
Reza Qoli Mirza Afshar born 5 April

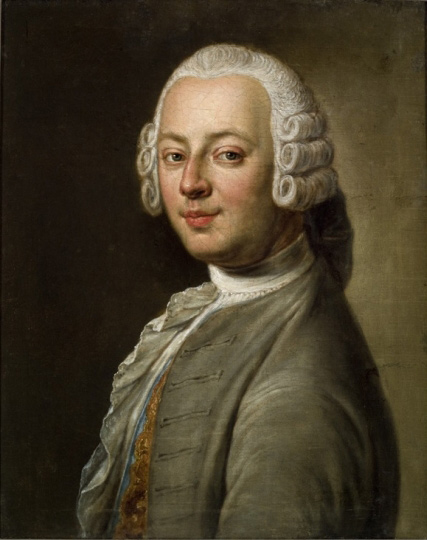
Christian Gottfried Krause born 17 April

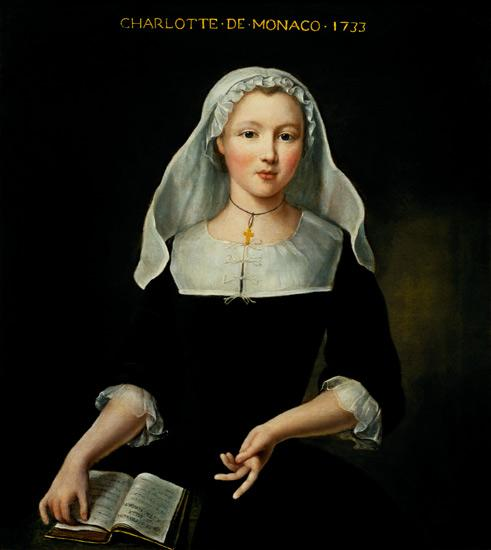
Charlotte of Monaco born 19 May

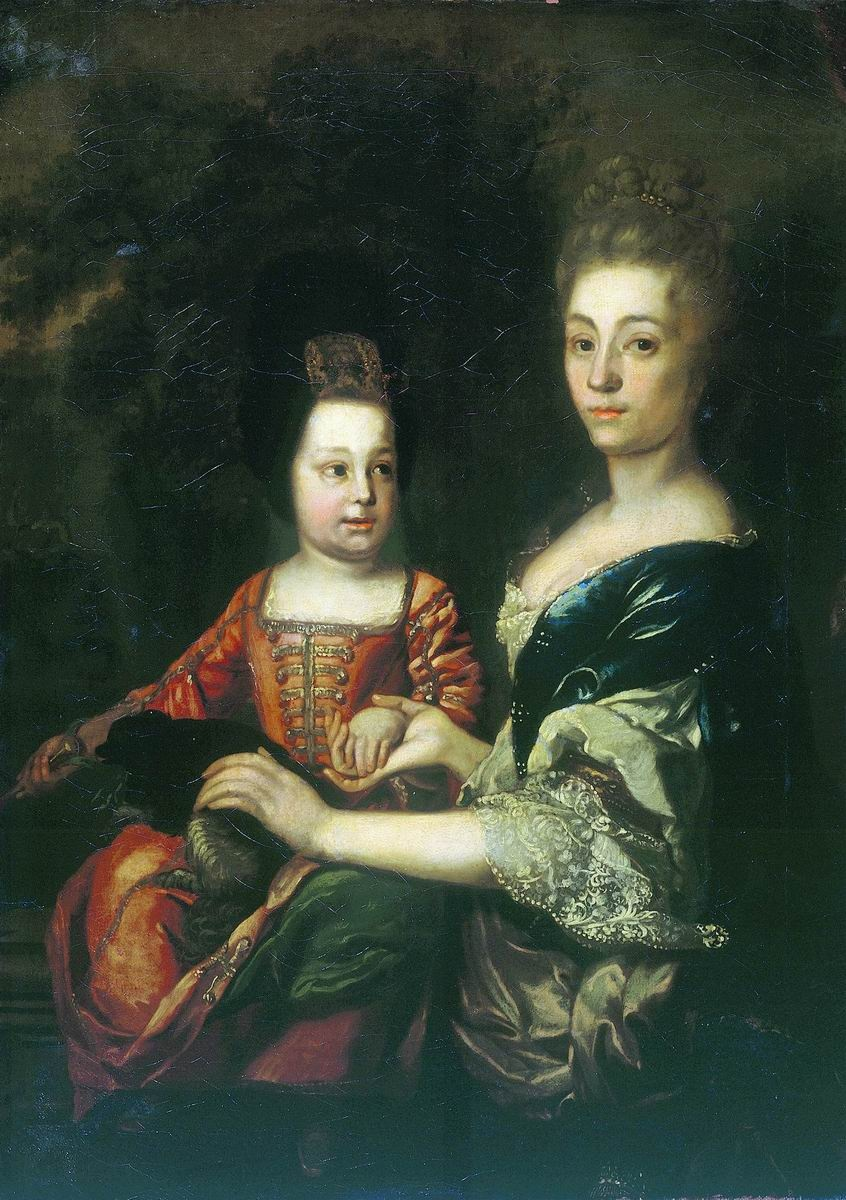
Julia von Mengden born 22 May

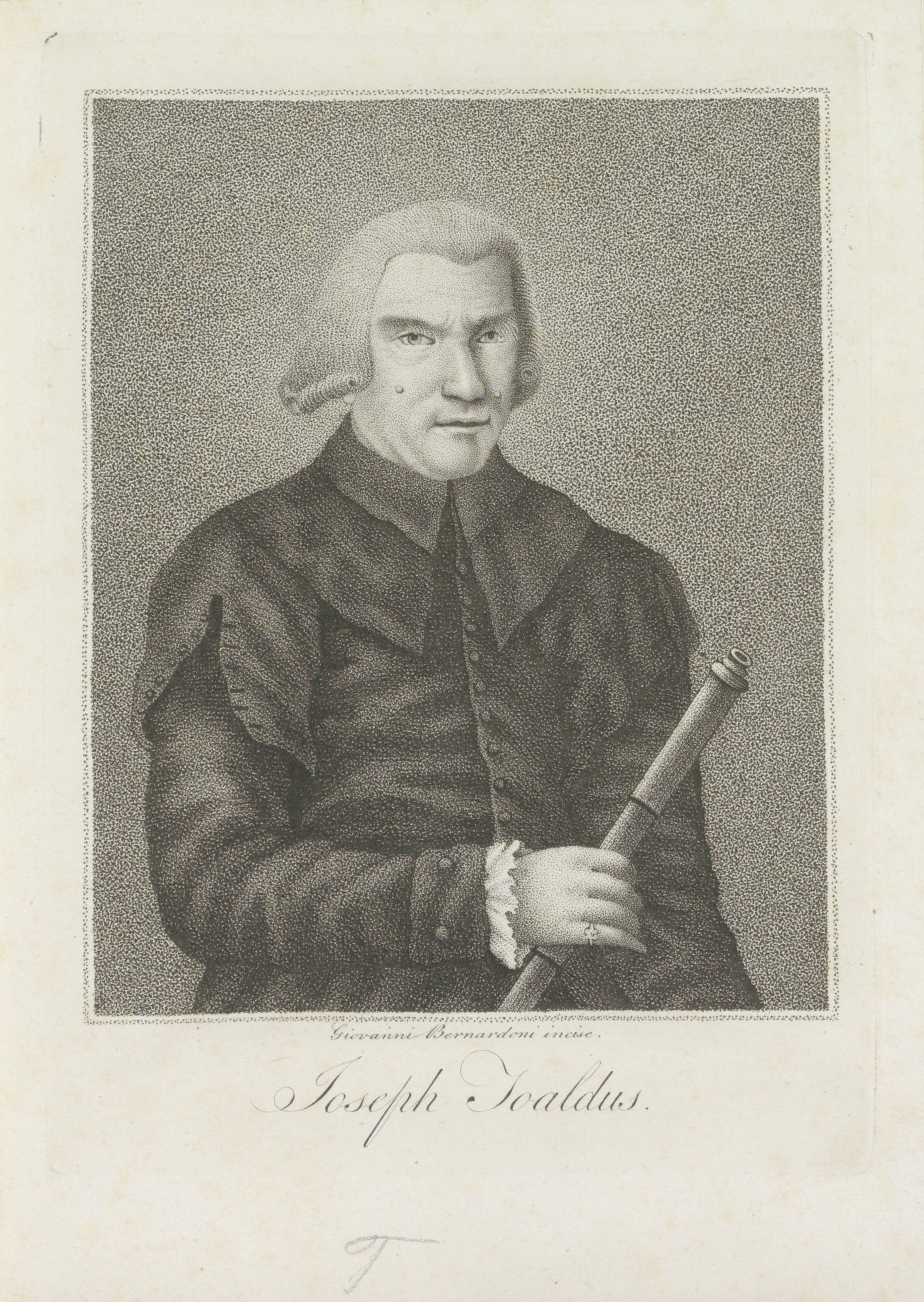
Giuseppe Toaldo born 11 July

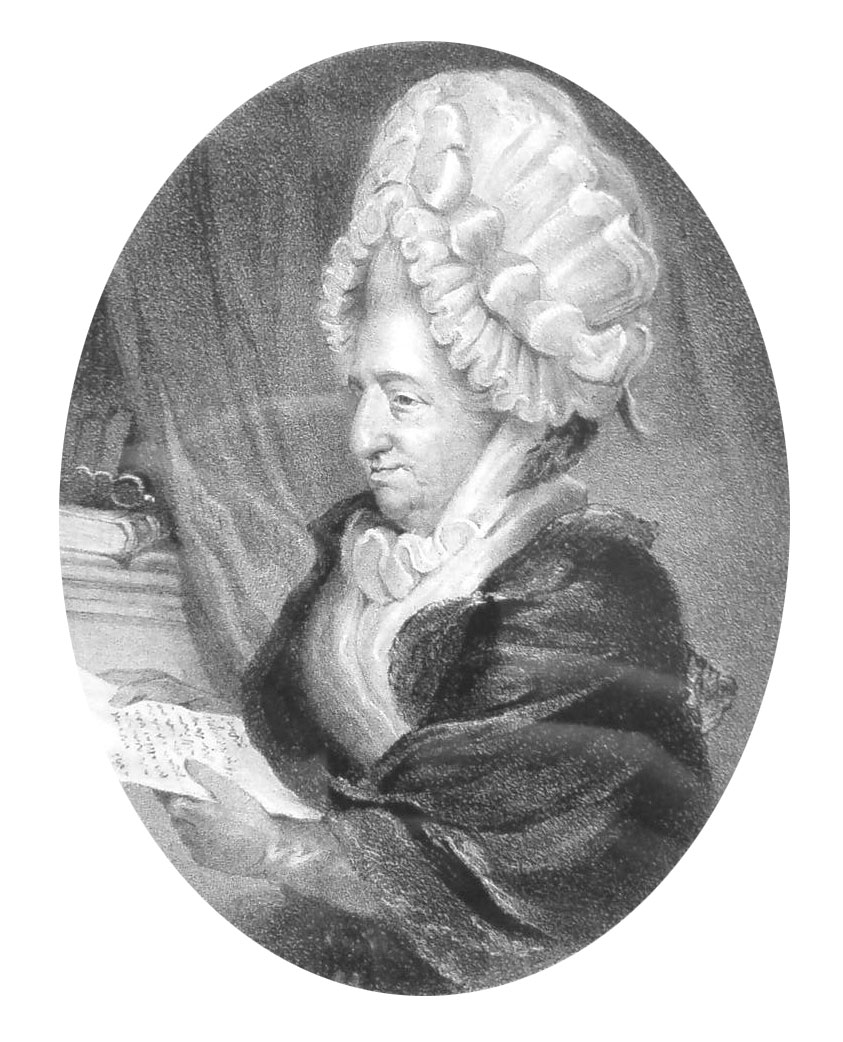
Frances Boscawen born 23 July

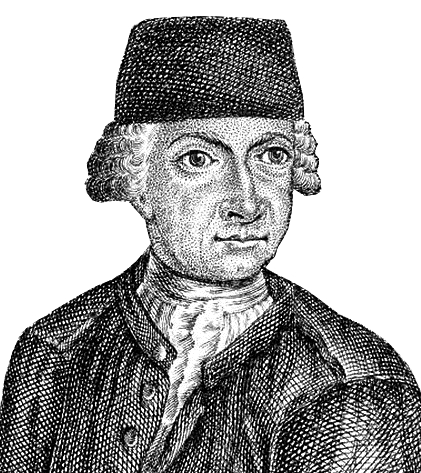
Johann Gottlob Lehmann born 4 August

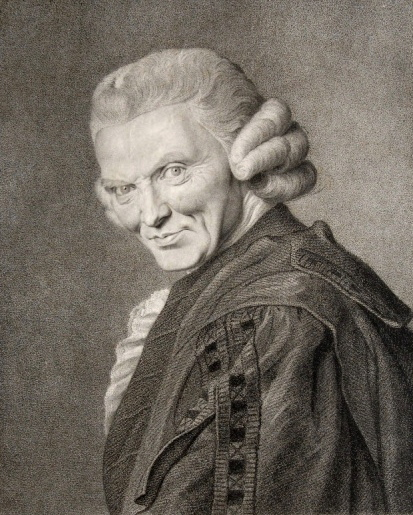
Robert Glynn born 5 August

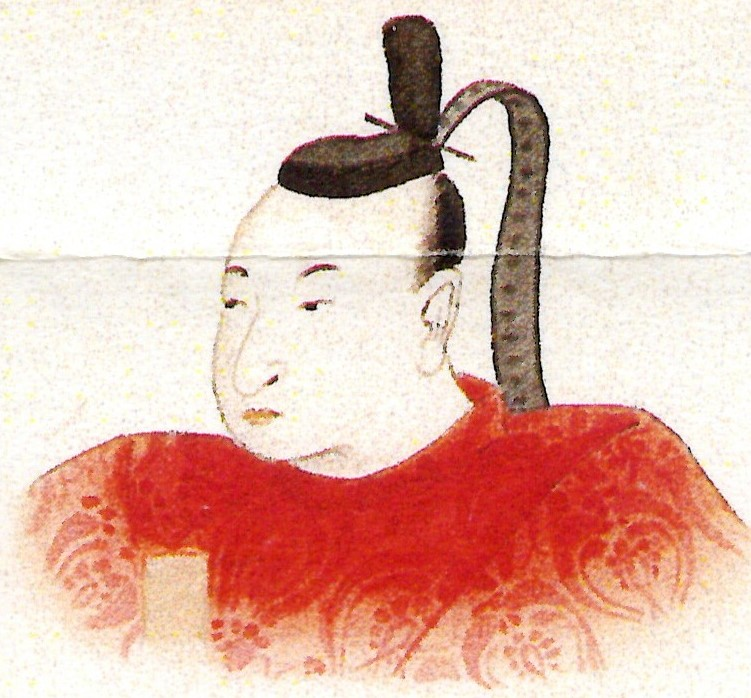
Itakura Katsuzumi born 13 August

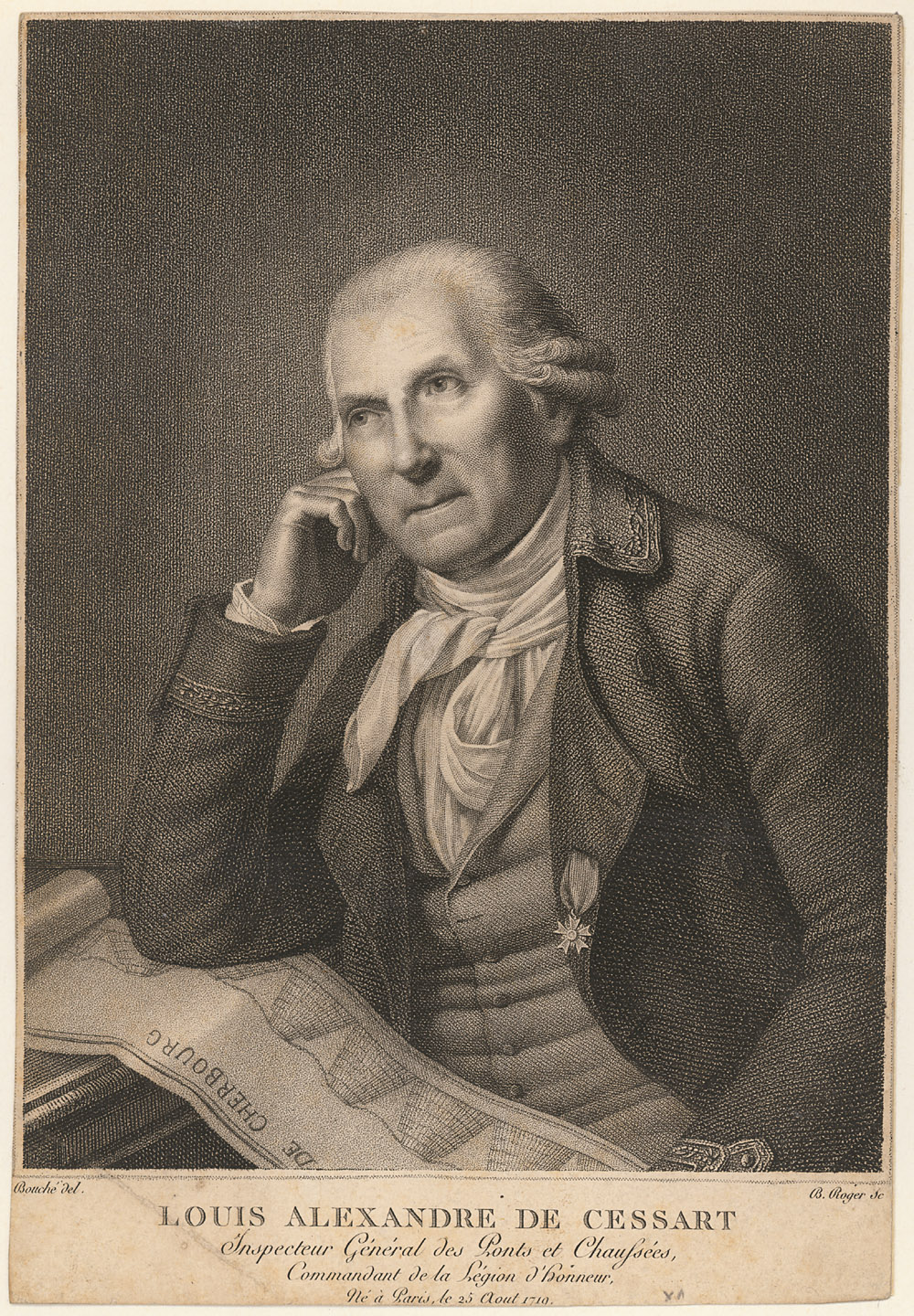
Louis-Alexandre de Cessart born 25 August

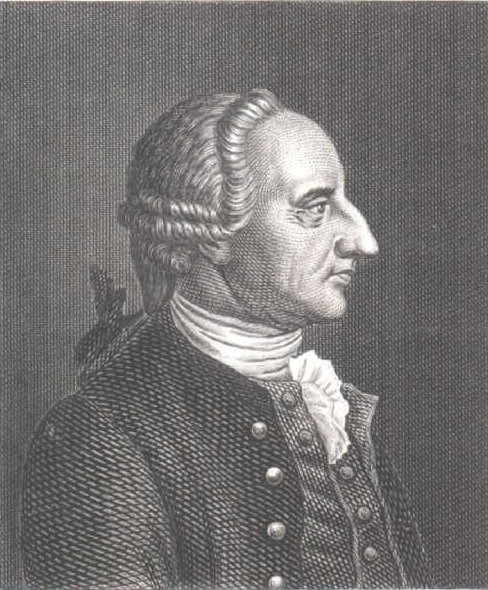
Abraham Gotthelf Kästner born 27 September

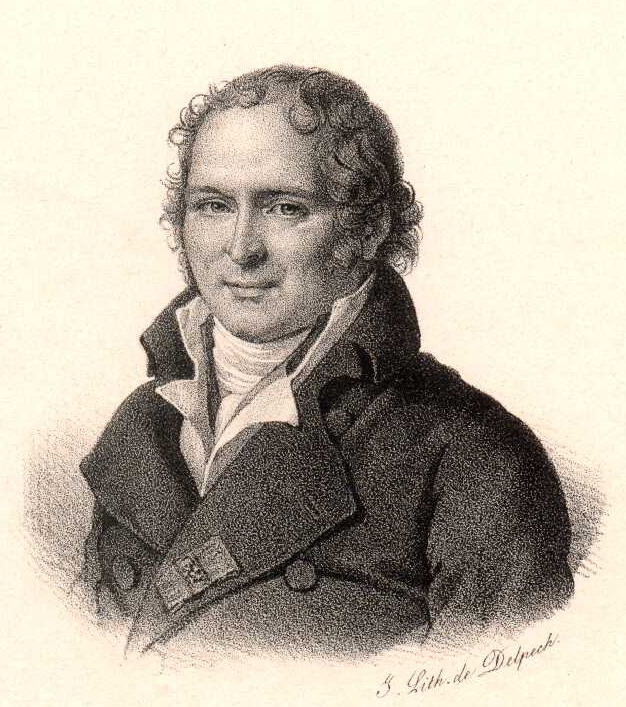
François Poulletier de la Salle born 30 September

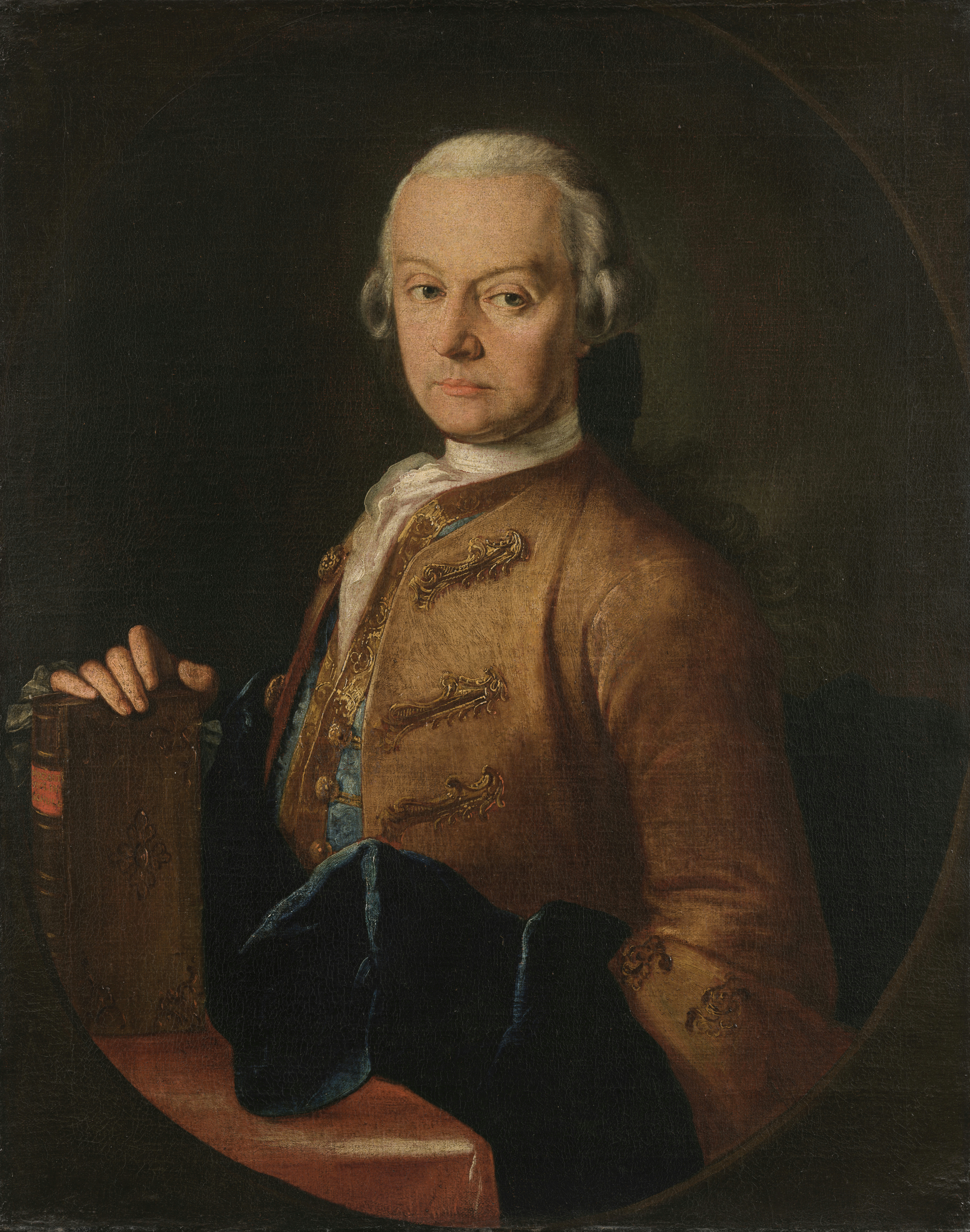
Leopold Mozart born 14 November

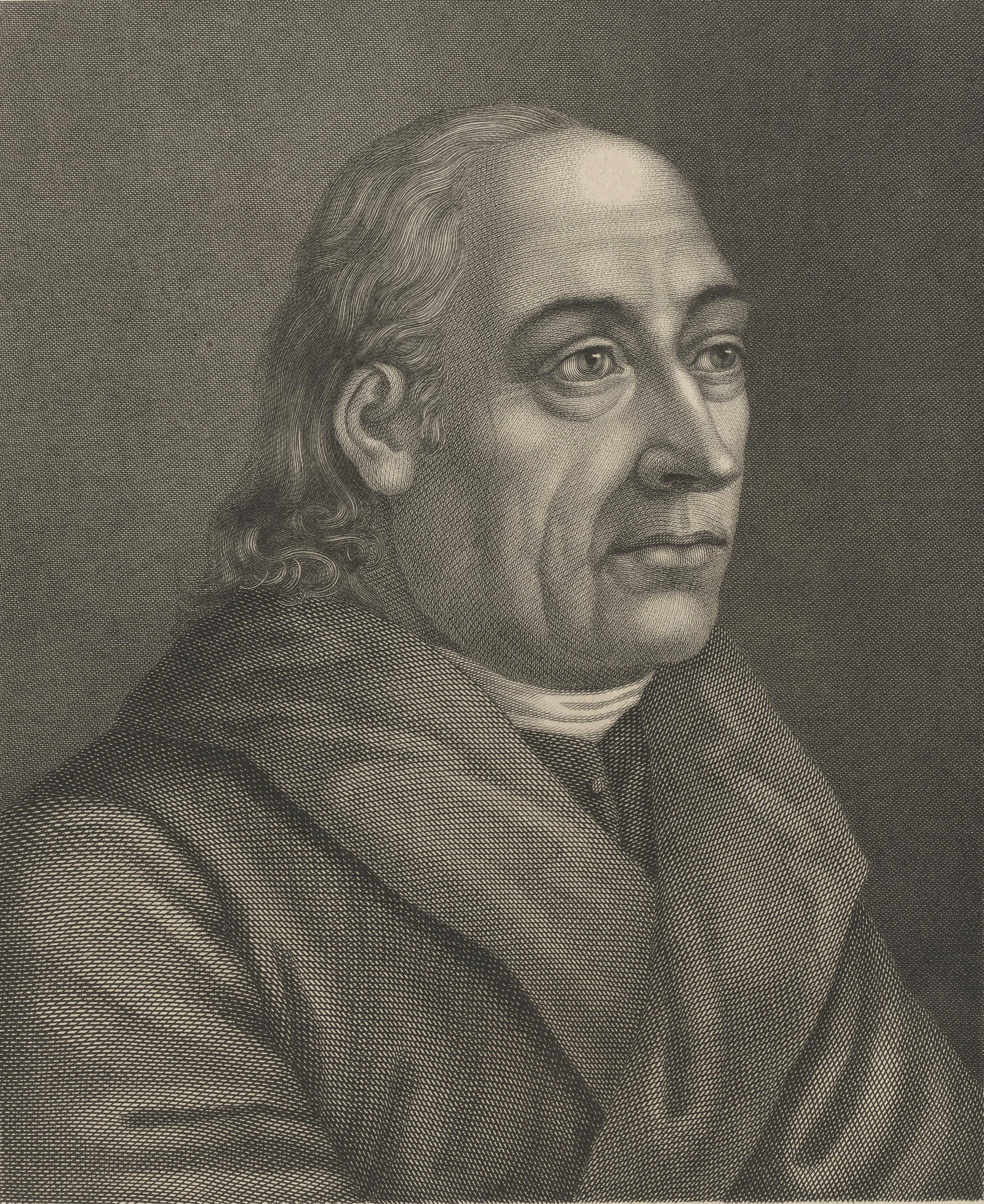
Johann Gottlob Immanuel Breitkopf born 23 November

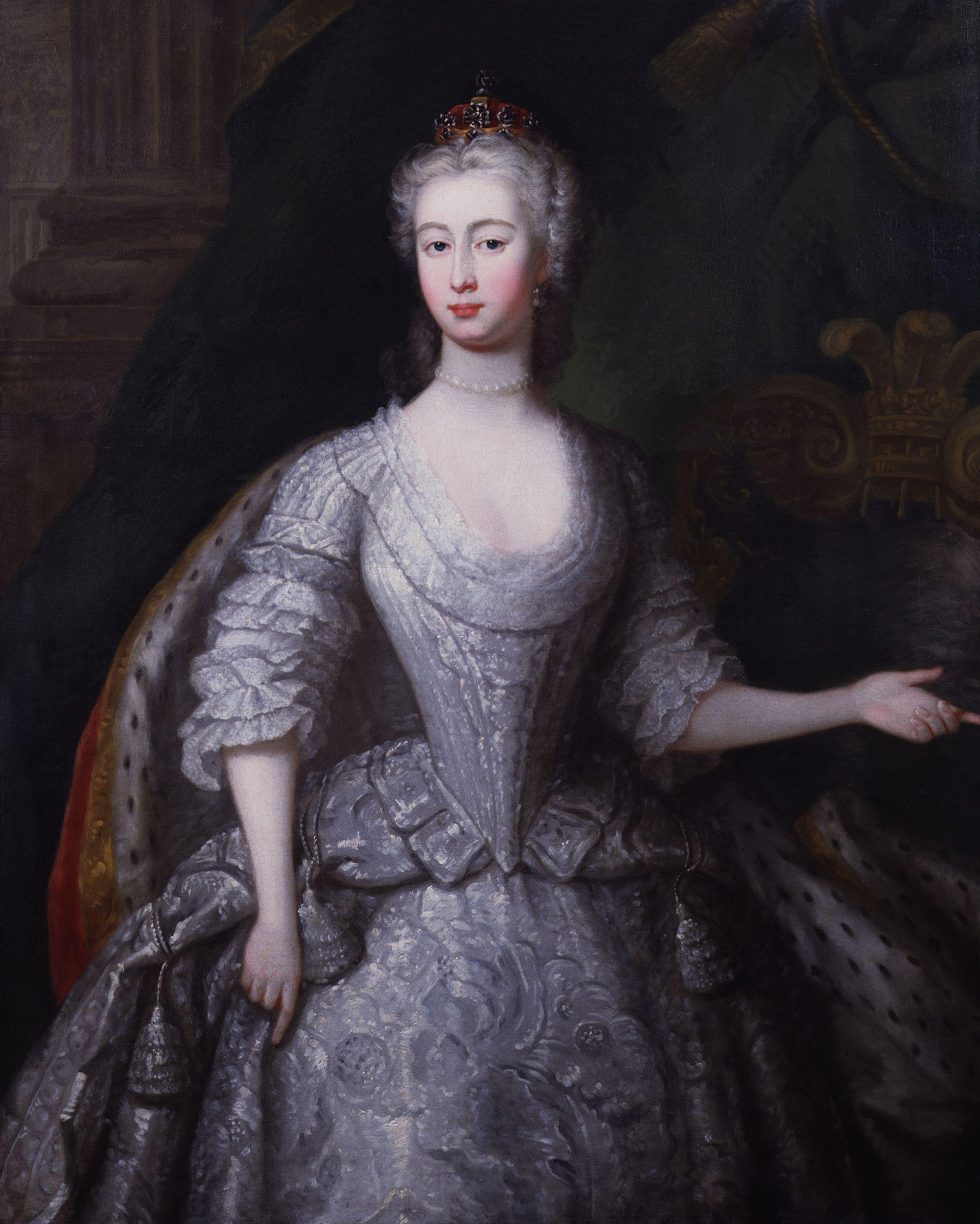
Princess Augusta of Saxe-Gotha born 30 November

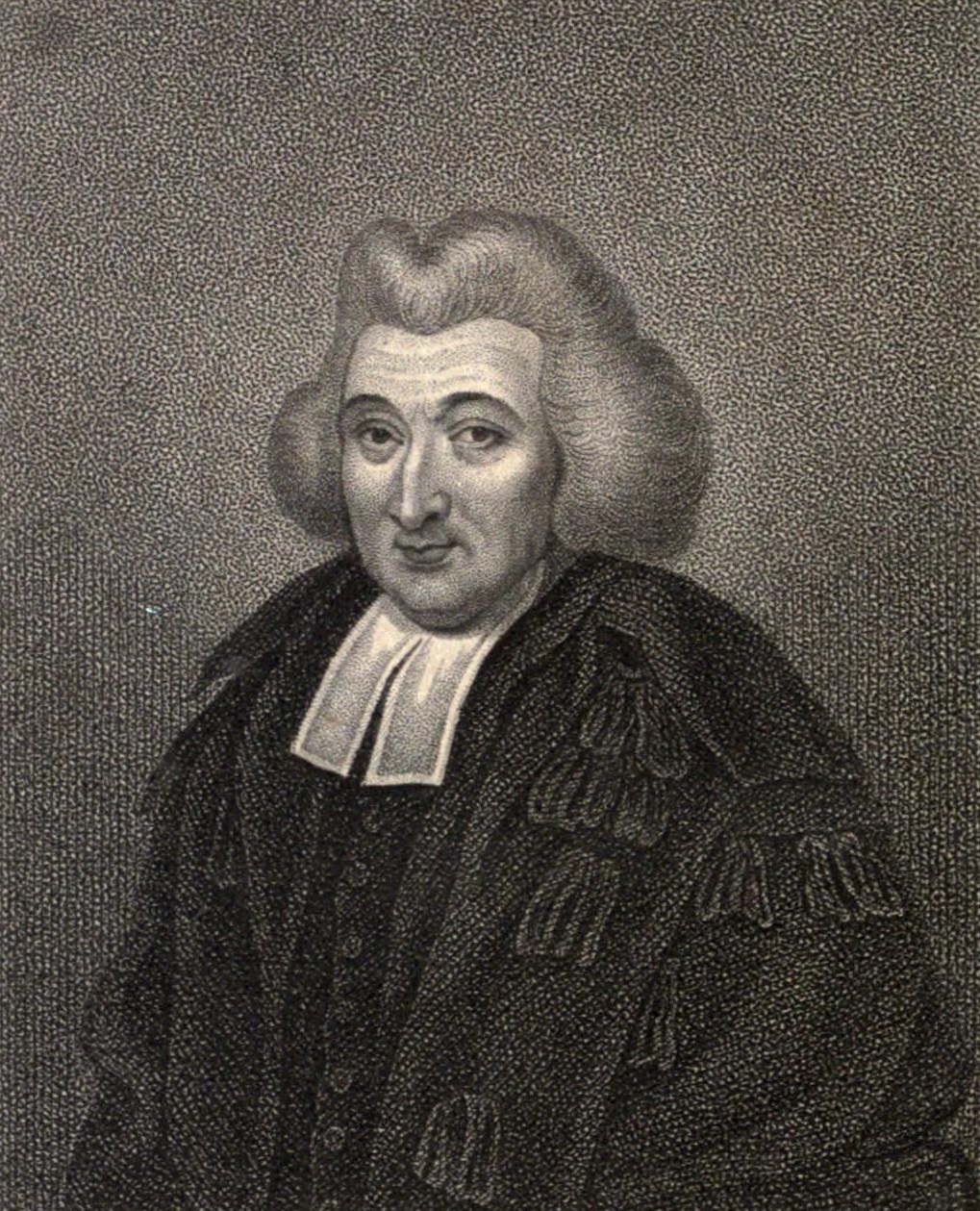
George Campbell born 25 December

- January 1 – Pierre-François Hugues d'Hancarville, art historian and historian of ideas (d. 1805)
- January 2
  - Jacques-Alexandre Laffon de Ladebat, French shipbuilder and merchant (d. 1797)
  - Friedrich Christoph von Saldern, German general (d. 1785)
- January 3
  - Friedrich Karl Joseph von Erthal, Catholic archbishop (d. 1802)
  - Basil Feilding, 6th Earl of Denbigh, Earl in the Peerage of England (d. 1800)
  - Francisco José Freire, Portuguese historian and philologist (d. 1773)
- January 6
  - Ivan Ivanovich Belsky, Russian painter (d. 1799)
  - Guillaume de Barrême de Châteaufort, French painter (d. 1775)
  - William Hammond, British hymnist (d. 1783)
  - Ignazio Marabitti, Italian artist (d. 1797)
- January 10 – Maria Dorothea Wagner, German painter (d. 1792)
- January 14 – Daniel Nettelbladt, German jurist and philosopher (d. 1791)
- January 15 – William Fitzwilliam, 3rd Earl Fitzwilliam, British peer (d. 1756)
- January 17
  - Maria van Antwerpen, soldier (d. 1781)
  - Samuel Enderby, English whale oil merchant who sponsored Arctic exploration (d. 1797)
  - Rajmundo Kunić, Croatian writer (d. 1794)
  - Johann Elias Schlegel, German critic and poet (d. 1749)
  - William Vernon, American merchant (d. 1806)
- January 22
  - Benjamin Hinman, surveyor, soldier, legislator (d. 1810)
  - Henry Paget, 2nd Earl of Uxbridge, British Earl (d. 1769)
- January 23 – John Landen, English mathematician (d. 1790)
- January 25 – Princess Sophia Dorothea of Prussia (d. 1765)
- January 30 – Magnus Gottfried Lichtwer, German writer (d. 1783)
- February 2 – Edward Coke, Viscount Coke, British politician (d. 1753)
- February 4 – Ernst Wilhelm von Schlabrendorf, German politician (d. 1769)
- February 6 – Alberto Pullicino, Maltese painter (d. 1765)
- February 10 – Clemente Sibiliato, Italian cleric (d. 1795)
- February 11 – Vasilije Božičković, Eparch of Križevci (d. 1785)
- February 13
  - Samuel Finney, English miniature-painter (d. 1798)
  - Joseph Liesganig, Austrian astronomer and Jesuit (d. 1799)
- February 14 – David Doig, writer (d. 1800)
- February 15
  - Wilhelm Sebastian von Belling, German general (d. 1779)
  - Jean Jacques Flipart, Engraver from France (d. 1782)
  - Crown Prince Hyojang, crown prince of Joseon, son of king Yeongjo of Joseon (d. 1728)
- February 18 – Ferdinand Christoph Oetinger, German physician (d. 1772)
- February 19 – Arthur Blennerhassett, Anglo-Irish politician (d. 1799)
- February 20
  - Joseph Bellamy, American pastor, author and educator (d. 1790)
  - Charles Clarke, English numismatist (d. 1780)
- February 22 – Joshua Thomas, Historian of Welsh Baptists (d. 1797)
- February 23 – Moses Mather, American clergyman (d. 1806)
- February 27 – Alejandro González Velázquez, Spanish architect and painter (d. 1772)
- March 1 – Daniel Thurston, American army officer (d. 1805)
- March 4 – George Pigot, 1st Baron Pigot, British governor of Madras (d. 1777)
- March 6
  - João Carlos de Bragança, 2nd Duke of Lafões, Portuguese politician (d. 1806)
- March 10 – Pierre-Paul Lemercier de La Rivière de Saint-Médard, French economist (d. 1801)
- March 13 – John Griffin, 4th Baron Howard de Walden, British nobleman and soldier (d. 1797)
- March 16 – Prince Georg Ludwig of Holstein-Gottorp, Prussian lieutenant-general, Imperial Russian field marshal (d. 1763)
- March 17 – Gabriel Podoski, Catholic archbishop (d. 1777)
- March 23 – Anna Catharina Bischoff, Lady (or mummy) of the Barfüsser Church (d. 1787)
- March 26 – Lubbert Jan van Eck, Dutch noble (d. 1765)
- March 29 – John Hawkins, English author and music historian (d. 1789)
- March 30 – John Wentworth, American jurist, soldier, leader of the American Revolution in New Hampshire (d. 1781)
- April 2
  - Vincenzo Legrenzo Ciampi, Italian composer (d. 1762)
  - Johann Wilhelm Ludwig Gleim, German poet (d. 1803)
- April 3
  - Daniel Dupuy, American silversmith (d. 1807)
  - Thomas Grenville, Royal Navy officer killed in action in the War of the Austrian Succession (d. 1747)
- April 4 – Mary Draper, American revolutionary character (d. 1810)
- April 5
  - Reza Qoli Mirza Afshar, prince of Persia (d. 1747)
  - Axel von Fersen the Elder, lantmarskalk or marshal of the diet (d. 1794)
- April 8 – Edmund Pery, 1st Viscount Pery, Irish politician, Speaker of the Irish House of Commons (d. 1806)
- April 9 – Sir Edward Blackett, 4th Baronet, British politician and barrister (d. 1804)
- April 11 – Jakob Friedrich Heusinger, German classical philologist (d. 1778)
- April 13 – John Breynton, Welsh missionary and minister (d. 1799)
- April 16
  - Mathieu-Antoine Bouchaud, French economist and professor (d. 1804)
  - Tsugaru Nobuaki, Japanese Daimyo (d. 1744)
- April 17
  - Friedrich Hensing, German physician (d. 1745)
  - Pierre-Thomas-Nicolas Hurtaut, French writer (d. 1791)
  - Christian Gottfried Krause, German composer (d. 1770)
- April 19 – William Banks, British politician (d. 1761)
- April 22 – Jacques Rochette de La Morlière, French writer (d. 1785)
- April 24 – Giuseppe Marc'Antonio Baretti, Italian-born English literary critic and author (d. 1789)
- April 28 – Sir Edward Turner, 2nd Baronet, British politician (d. 1766)
- May 5 – Andrew Meikle, Scottish engineer (d. 1811)
- May 6 – Jean Baptiste Christy de La Pallière, French Navy officer (d. 1787)
- May 8 – Nicholas Dias Abeysinghe, ceylonese Dutch colonial administrator (d. 1794)
- May 17 – Bjarni Pálsson, Icelandic doctor (d. 1779)
- May 19
  - Johann von Fries, counsellor, director of the imperial silk factories, industrialist, banker (d. 1785)
  - Charlotte of Monaco, Monegasque princess and nun (d. 1790)
  - Matthew Patten, American judge (d. 1795)
- May 20 – Roger Newdigate, English politician, antiquities collector (d. 1806)
- May 22
  - Charles Howard, Viscount Morpeth, British politician (d. 1741)
  - Julia von Mengden, Russian noble (d. 1787)
  - Matsudaira Nobunao, daimyo of the middle Edo period; 2nd lord of Hamamatsu, later 1st lord of Yoshida (d. 1768)
- May 24 – Eyre Massey, 1st Baron Clarina, Irish Baron (d. 1804)
- May 27 – Henri-Joseph Dulaurens, French writer (d. 1793)
- May 29 – Lorenzo De Caro, Italian painter (d. 1777)
- May 31 – Robert Rutherfurd, Scottish merchant, Baron of the Russian Empire (d. 1794)
- June 2 – Michel-Jean Sedaine, French dramatist and librettist (d. 1797)
- June 3 – Louis Paul Abeille, economist (d. 1807)
- June 5 – Domenico Orsini d'Aragona, Italian cardinal (d. 1789)
- June 10
  - Michael Gottlieb Agnethler, German botanist and numismatist (d. 1752)
  - Francisco Mariano Nipho, Spanish writer (d. 1803)
- June 11 – François-Charles de Velbrück, Roman Catholic bishop (d. 1784)
- June 17 – Joshua Parry, Welsh nonconformist minister and writer (d. 1776)
- June 19 – Sir Thomas Clavering, 7th Baronet, British politician (d. 1794)
- June 28 – Étienne François, duc de Choiseul, French general, diplomat, statesman (d. 1785)
- July 2 – Josip Šišković, Hapsburg military officer (d. 1783)
- July 7
  - William de Grey, 1st Baron Walsingham, British lawyer, judge, politician (d. 1781)
  - Johann Karl von Herberstein, Austrian bishop (d. 1787)
- July 11 – Giuseppe Toaldo, Italian physicist (d. 1797)
- July 16
  - William Walond Sr., English composer and organist (d. 1768)
  - Gerrit Zegelaar, Dutch painter (d. 1794)
- July 23 – Frances Boscawen, English literary hostess; (d. 1805)
- July 25 – Chevalier de Johnstone, Jacobite Army officer (d. 1800)
- July 26 – Elizabeth Pakenham, 1st Countess of Longford, English noblewoman (d. 1794)
- July 29 – William Innes, British Member of Parliament (d. 1795)
- August 4 – Johann Gottlob Lehmann, German and Russian mineralogist (d. 1767)
- August 5 – Robert Glynn, British doctor (d. 1800)
- August 7
  - Francisco Fabián y Fuero, Roman Catholic archbishop (d. 1801)
  - Jabez Huntington, American businessman 1719–1786 (d. 1786)
- August 10 – Philip Thicknesse, author (d. 1792)
- August 11 – George Selwyn, British politician (d. 1791)
- August 13 – Itakura Katsuzumi, Japanese samurai (d. 1769)
- August 18 – Bernard Ward, 1st Viscount Bangor, Irish politician and peer (d. 1781)
- August 19 – Charles-François de Broglie, marquis de Ruffec, French soldier, diplomat (d. 1781)
- August 20
  - James Bonner, American colonel (d. 1782)
  - Christian Mayer, Czech-German astronomer (d. 1783)
- August 23 – Pierre Poivre, French horticulturalist (d. 1786)
- August 25
  - Louis-Alexandre de Cessart, French engineer (d. 1806)
  - Charles-Amédée-Philippe van Loo, French painter (d. 1795)
- August 26 – Carlo Sebastiano Berardi, Italian jurist (d. 1768)
- September 3 – Ferdinand Zellbell the Younger, Swedish composer (d. 1780)
- September 6 – Somerset Hamilton Butler, 1st Earl of Carrick (d. 1754)
- September 11 – Tanuma Okitsugu, Japanese government official (d. 1788)
- September 13 – Étienne Ficquet, engraver (d. 1794)
- September 15 – Friedrich Christian Meuschen, German zoologist (d. 1811)
- September 17
  - Edward Kimber, British writer (d. 1769)
  - James Smith, signatory to the United States Declaration of Independence (d. 1806)
- September 21
  - Larcum Kendall, British watchmaker (d. 1790)
  - Johann Friedrich Mayer, agriculturalist (d. 1798)
- September 24 – Florian Baucke, Jesuit missionary (d. 1780)
- September 27 – Abraham Gotthelf Kästner, German mathematician (d. 1800)
- September 30 – François Poulletier de la Salle, chemist and medical doctor (d. 1788)
- October 1 – John Bligh, 3rd Earl of Darnley, British politician (d. 1781)
- October 3 – Paul Henry Ourry, British Member of Parliament (d. 1783)
- October 7 – Jacques Cazotte, French writer (d. 1792)
- October 9 – Georg Mathias Fuchs, German painter in Denmark (d. 1797)
- October 10 – Francis Greville, 1st Earl of Warwick, English Earl (d. 1773)
- October 12 – Ignaz Franz, German priest, hymnwriter (d. 1790)
- October 13 – Josef Ignaz Mildorfer, Austrian painter (d. 1775)
- October 14 – John Holker, English Jacobite soldier, industrialist and commercial spy (d. 1786)
- October 18 – Charles Bulkley, British minister (d. 1797)
- October 20 – Gottfried Achenwall, German philosopher, historian, economist, jurist, statistician (d. 1772)
- October 23 – Peter Fenger, Danish merchant (d. 1774)
- October 24
  - Jakob Gadolin, Finnish bishop (d. 1802)
  - Pierre Sigorgne, French physicist (d. 1809)
- October 25 – Edward Townshend, Anglican dean of Norwich (d. 1765)
- October 26
  - Sir William Codrington, 2nd Baronet, British Member of Parliament (d. 1792)
  - Hyacinthe Gaëtan de Lannion, French politician (d. 1762)
- October 30 – Lazzaro Opizio Pallavicino, Italian priest (d. 1785)
- November 6 – Louis-Antoine Caraccioli, French writer, poet and historian (d. 1803)
- November 9 – Domenico Lorenzo Ponziani, Italian chess player (d. 1796)
- November 14
  - Leopold Mozart, German/Austrian composer, father of Wolfgang Amadeus Mozart (d. 1787)
  - Franz Ludwig Wind, Swiss sculptor (d. 1789)
- November 17
  - Marie Marguerite Bihéron, Medical illustrator (d. 1795)
  - Francis Home, Scottish physician (d. 1813)
- November 22 – Johann Friedrich Reiffenstein, German artist (d. 1793)
- November 23
  - Spranger Barry, British actor (d. 1777)
  - Johann Gottlob Immanuel Breitkopf, German publisher and typographer (d. 1794)
  - Philip Wenman, 6th Viscount Wenman, Irish Viscount (d. 1760)
- November 30 – Princess Augusta of Saxe-Gotha, Princess of Wales (d. 1772)
- December 8 – Andrés Marcos Burriel, historian (d. 1762)
- December 13 – Thomas Gillespie, North Carolina planter (d. 1797)
- December 15 – Louis IX, Landgrave of Hesse-Darmstadt (d. 1790)
- December 18 – William Stanhope, 2nd Earl of Harrington, British Army general (d. 1779)
- December 25 – George Campbell, figure of the Scottish Enlightenment (d. 1796)
- December 26 – Salvatore Maria di Blasi, Italian priest (d. 1814)
- December 27 – John Phillips, American academic (d. 1795)
- December 28 – Charles Gravier, comte de Vergennes, French diplomat (d. 1787)
- date unknown
  - William Bradford, American revolutionary and printer (d. 1791)
  - Dominic Serres, French-born painter (d. 1793)
  - Thomas Sheridan, Irish actor (d. 1788)
  - Thomas Elfe, furniture craftsman in Charleston, South Carolina (d. 1775)

== Deaths ==
1710

- January 4 – Sir Richard Newdigate, 2nd Baronet, English landowner (b. 1644)
- January 6 – Thomas Fairfax, 5th Lord Fairfax of Cameron, English politician (b. 1657)
- January 16 – Emperor Higashiyama of Japan (b. 1675)
- January 28 – Philip Verheyen, Flemish physician (b. 1648)
- January 21
  - John Ashburnham, 1st Baron Ashburnham, English politician (b. 1656)
  - Johann Georg Gichtel, German mystic (b. 1638)
- January 30
  - Madeleine Boullogne, French painter (b. 1646)
  - Sebastian Valfrè, Italian Oratorian priest (b. 1629)
- February 16 – Esprit Fléchier, French writer and Bishop of Nîmes (b. 1632)
- February 17 – George Bull, English theologian and Bishop of St David's (b. 1634)
- February 20 – Johan Vibe, Norwegian noble (b. 1637)
- February 25 – Daniel Greysolon, Sieur du Lhut, French explorer (b. c. 1639)
- March 4 – Louis III, Prince of Condé (b. 1668)
- March 5 – John Holt, English politician (b. 1642)
- March 14 – Michel Bégon, French ancien regime official (b. 1638)
- March 28 – Charles Fanshawe, 4th Viscount Fanshawe, English politician (b. 1643)
- April 7 – Sir Richard Bulkeley, 2nd Baronet of England (b. 1660)
- April 28 – Thomas Betterton, English actor (b. c. 1635)
- May 13 – Henry, Duke of Saxe-Römhild (b. 1650)
- May 29
  - John Dolben, British politician (b. 1662)
  - Henri Basnage de Beauval, French historian, lexicographer (b. 1657)
- June 1 – David Mitchell, British admiral (b. 1642)
- June 4 – James Stuart, 1st Earl of Bute (b. 1661)
- June 7 – Louise de La Vallière, mistress of King Louis XIV of France (b. 1644)
- July 2 – Domenico Freschi, Italian opera composer, Catholic priest (b. 1634)
- July 12 – Robert Treat, American colonial leader (b. 1624)
- July 25 – Gottfried Kirch, German astronomer, first 'Astronomer Royal' in Berlin (b. 1639)

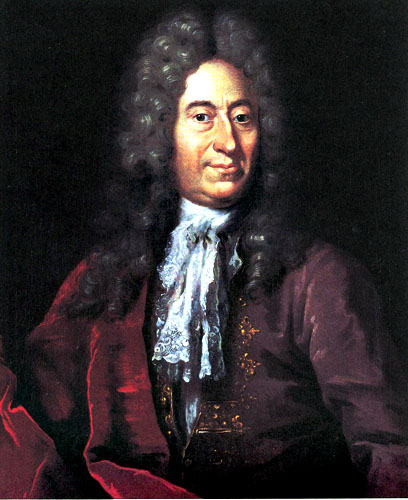
Ole Rømer

- September 19 – Ole Rømer, Danish astronomer (b. 1644)
- September 22 – Jacques-René de Brisay de Denonville, Marquis de Denonville (b. 1637)
- September 24 – Charles Berkeley, 2nd Earl of Berkeley, English diplomat (b. 1649)
- September 26 – Sir Robert Kemp, 2nd Baronet, English politician (b. 1627)
- October 19 – Suzanne Henriette of Lorraine, French noblewoman, Duchess of Mantua and Montferrat (b. 1686)
- November 3 – Maria de Croll, Swedish vocalist
- November 21 – Bernardo Pasquini, Italian composer of operas (b. 1637)
- December 15 – Albert Anton, Prince of Schwarzburg-Rudolstadt (b. 1641)
- December 18 – Petrus Codde, Dutch cleric, first Old Catholic bishop (b. 1648)
- date unknown – Anna Maria Thelott, Swedish artist (b. 1683)

1711

- January 6 – Philips van Almonde, Dutch admiral (b. 1644)

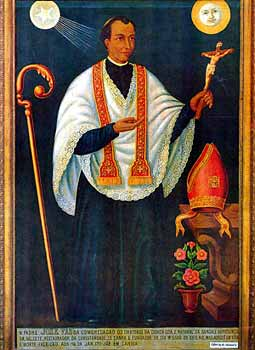
Joseph Vaz

- January 16 – Blessed Joseph Vaz, Apostle of Ceylon (b. 1651)
- January 10 – John Manners, 1st Duke of Rutland, English nobleman and politician (b. 1638)
- January 21 – Augustinus Terwesten, 18th century painter from the Northern Netherlands (b. 1649)
- January 26 – Luis Francisco de la Cerda, Spanish noble, politician (b. 1660)
- February 3 – Francesco Maria de' Medici, Duke of Rovere and Montefeltro, Italian Catholic cardinal (b. 1660)
- March 3 – Charles, Landgrave of Hesse-Wanfried (1676–1711) (b. 1649)
- March 13 – Nicolas Boileau-Despréaux, French poet and critic (b. 1636)
- March 15 – Eusebio Kino, Italian Catholic missionary (b. 1645)
- March 19 – Thomas Ken, English bishop and hymn-writer (b. 1637)
- March 29 – Gabriel Gerberon, French Jansenist monk (b. 1628)
- April 9 – Charles Duncombe, British politician (b. 1648)

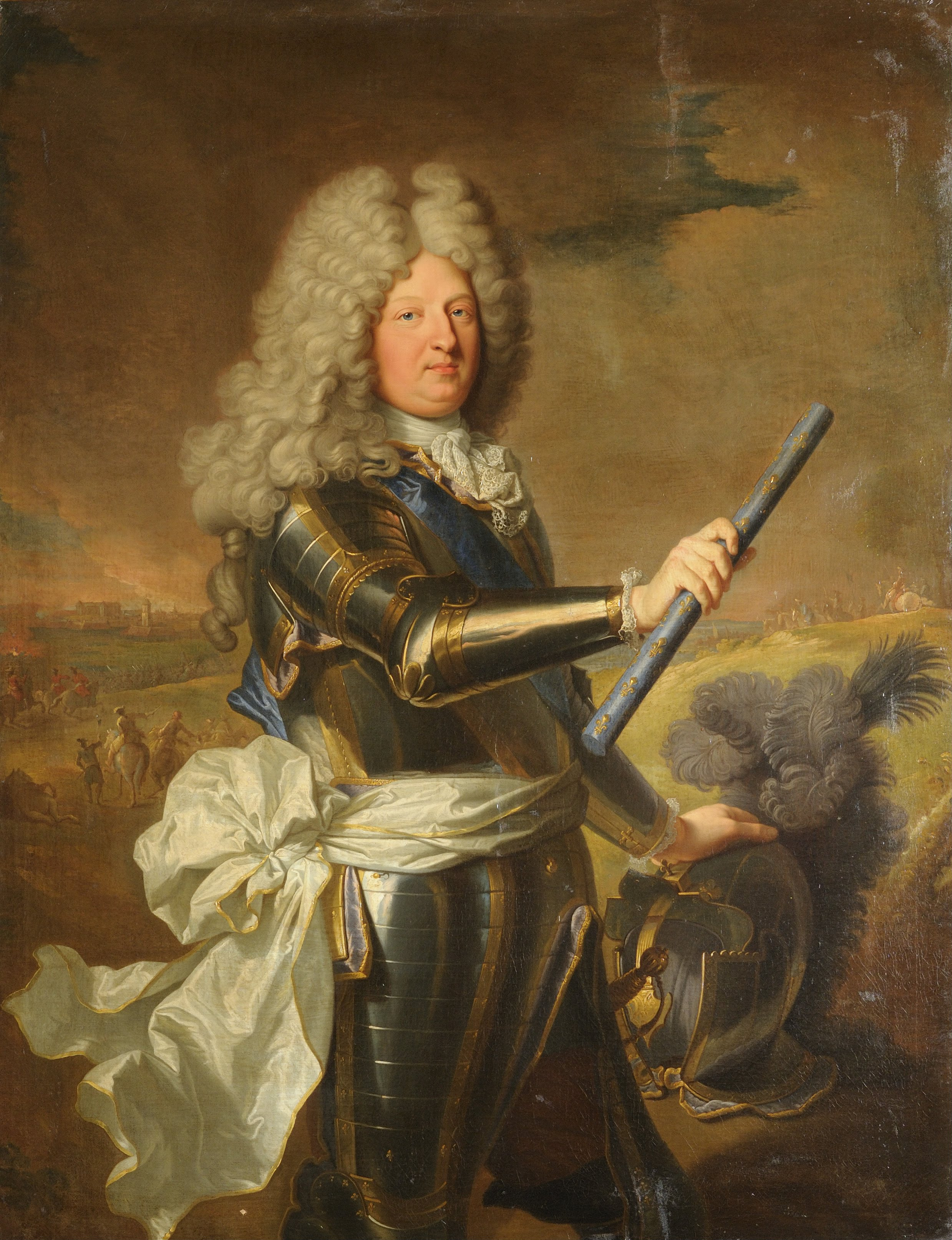
Louis, Grand Dauphin

- April 14 – Louis, Grand Dauphin, son of Louis XIV of France (b. 1661)
- April 17 – Joseph I, Holy Roman Emperor (b. 1678)
- May 2 – Laurence Hyde, 1st Earl of Rochester, English statesman (b. 1641)
- June 7 – Henry Dodwell, Irish theologian (b. 1641)
- June 8 – Katharyne Lescailje, Dutch writer (b. 1649)
- June 16 – Maria Amalia of Courland, Landgravine of Hesse-Kassel (b. 1653)
- July 6 – James Douglas, 2nd Duke of Queensberry, Scottish politician (b. 1662)
- July 11 – Joseph Ball, American settler, public servant, and maternal grandfather of George Washington (b. 1649)
- July 15 – John Holles, 1st Duke of Newcastle, England (b. 1662)
- July 18 – Richard Verney, 11th Baron Willoughby de Broke, English baron (b. 1622)
- July 19 – Date Tsunamune, Japanese daimyō of Sendai han (b. 1640)
- August 22 – Louis François, duc de Boufflers, Marshal of France (b. 1644)
- August 25 – Edward Villiers, 1st Earl of Jersey, English politician (b. c. 1656)
- August 30 – Pieter Spierinckx, Flemish painter (b. 1635)
- August 31 – Jean Le Pelletier, French polygraph and alchemist (b. 1633)
- September 3 – Élisabeth Sophie Chéron, French musician (b. 1648)
- September 14 – Claude Aveneau, French missionary (b. 1650)
- September 17 – Giovanni Maria Gabrielli, Italian Catholic cardinal (b. 1654)
- September 19 – Davide Cocco Palmieri, Italian Catholic bishop (b. 1632)
- October 5 – Paulet St John, 3rd Earl of Bolingbroke, English politician (b. 1634)
- October 14 – Tewoflos, Emperor of Ethiopia
- October 30 – Wilhelmus à Brakel, Dutch theologian (b. 1635)
- November 3
  - John Ernest Grabe, German-born Anglican theologian (b. 1666)
  - Giordano Vitale, Italian mathematician (b. 1633)
- Date unknown – Cille Gad, Norwegian poet (b. 1675)

1712

- January 5 – Richard Jones, 1st Earl of Ranelagh, Irish politician (b. 1641)
- January 10 – John Houblon, first Governor of the Bank of England (1694-1697) (b. 1632)
- February 2 – Martin Lister, English naturalist, physician (b. c. 1638)
- February 12 – Marie Adélaïde of Savoy, wife of Louis, Dauphin of France, Duke of Burgundy (b. 1685)
- February 18 – Louis, duc de Bourgogne, heir to the throne of France (b. 1682)
- February 22 – Nicolas Catinat, French military commander and Marshal of France under Louis XIV (b. 1637)
- February 27 – Bahadur Shah I, Mughal Emperor of India (b. 1643)
- March 2 – Lorenzo Magalotti, Italian philosopher (b. 1637)
- March 18 – Azim-ush-Shan, Mughal prince (b. 1664)
- March 25 – Nehemiah Grew, English naturalist (b. 1641)

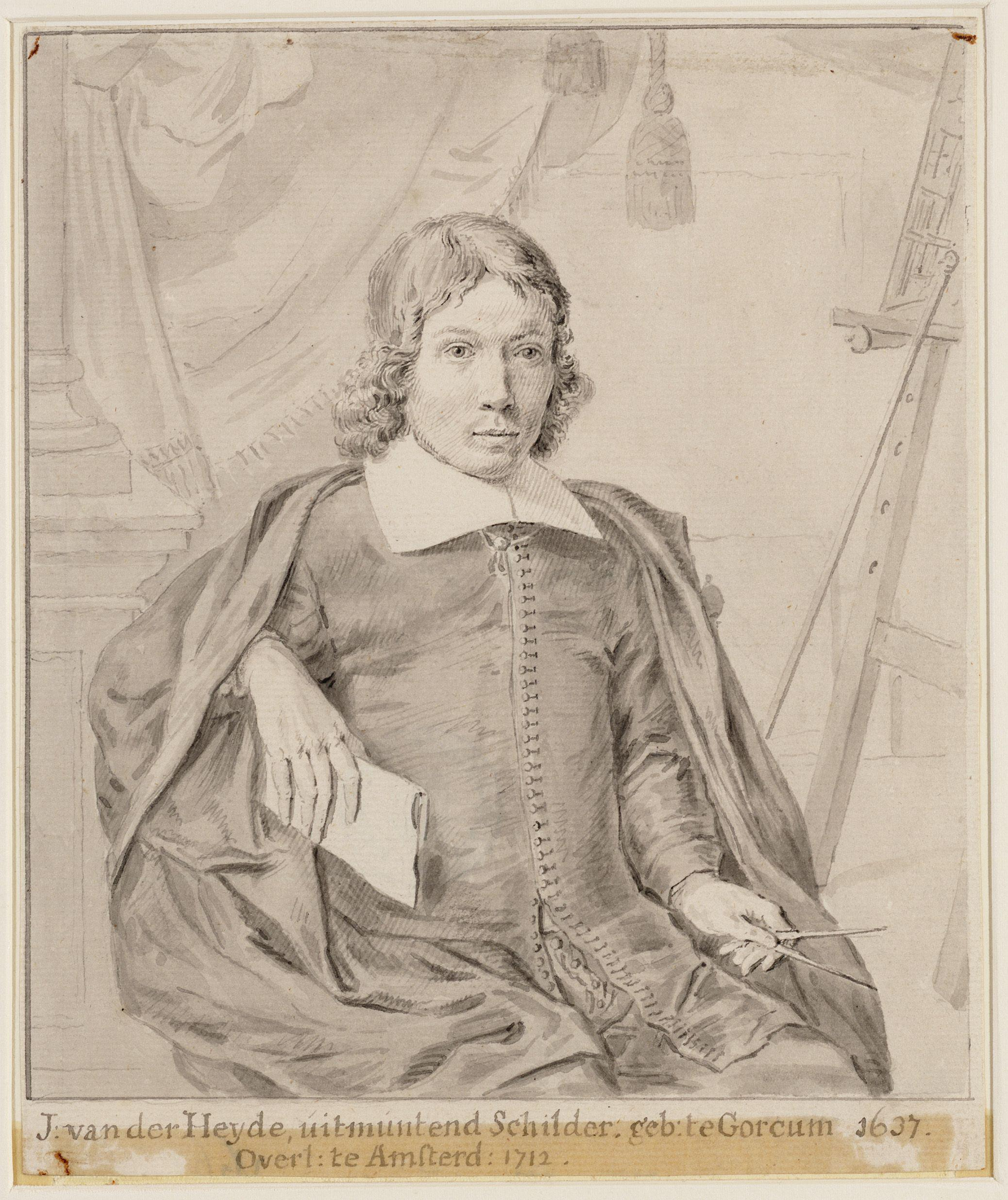
Jan van der Heyden

- March 28 – Jan van der Heyden, Dutch painter (b. 1637)
- March 30 – Johann Friedrich Mayer, German Lutheran theologian (b. 1650)
- April 9 – Giuseppe Archinto, Italian cardinal, Archbishop of Milan (b. 1651)
- April 11 – Richard Simon, French Biblical critic (b. 1638)
- April 27 – John Crowne, English playwright (b. 1641)
- April 29 – Juan Bautista Cabanilles, Spanish composer (b. 1644)
- April 30 – Philipp van Limborch, Dutch Protestant theologian (b. 1633)
- May 6 – Henric Piccardt, Dutch lawyer (b. 1636)
- May 20 – Christian Ernst, Margrave of Brandenburg-Bayreuth (1655–1712) (b. 1644)
- June 10 – Christian Franz Paullini, German physician (b. 1643)
- June 11 – Louis Joseph, Duke of Vendôme, French military commander (b. 1654)
- June 24 – Simon van der Stel, last Commander and first Governor of the Cape Colony (b. 1639)
- July – Baltacı Mehmet Pasha, Ottoman (Turkish) grand vizier (b. 1662)
- July 1 – William King, English poet (b. 1663)
- July 4 – Johann Kasimir Kolbe von Wartenberg, Prussian politician (b. 1643)

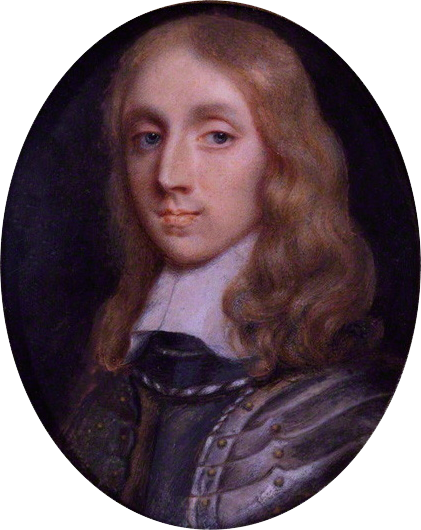
Richard Cromwell

- July 12 – Richard Cromwell, Lord Protector of England, Scotland, and Ireland (b. 1626)
- July 13 – Isaac de Porthau, Gascon black musketeer of the Maison du Roi (b. 1617)
- July 28 – Theodorus Janssonius van Almeloveen, Dutch classical scholar (b. 1657)
- July 26 – Thomas Osborne, 1st Duke of Leeds, English statesman (b. 1631)
- August 3 – Joshua Barnes, English scholar (b. 1654)
- August 7 – Friedrich Wilhelm Zachow, German composer (b. 1663)
- August 11 – Magdalena Sibylla of Hesse-Darmstadt, German regent (b. 1652)
- August 18 – Richard Savage, 4th Earl Rivers, English soldier (b. c. 1660)
- August 26 – Sebastian Anton Scherer, German organist and composer (b. 1631)
- August 29 – Gregory King, English statistician (b. 1648)
- September 9 – Edward Hyde, Governor of North Carolina (b. c. 1650)

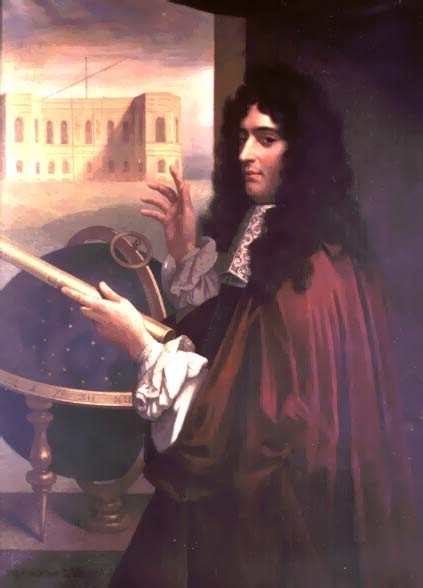
Giovanni Domenico Cassini

- September 14 – Giovanni Domenico Cassini, Italian-French astronomer and engineer (b. 1625)
- September 15 – Sidney Godolphin, 1st Earl of Godolphin, English politician (b. c.1645)
- September 23 – Thomas Halyburton, Scottish theologian (b. 1674)
- October 4 – Philip Reinhard, Count of Hanau-Münzenberg (b. 1664)
- October 25 – Ōkubo Tadatomo, Japanese daimyō (b. 1632)
- October 30 – Daniel Erich, German organist and composer (b. 1649)
- November 5 – Charles Honoré d'Albert, duc de Luynes, French noble (b. 1646)
- November 12 – Tokugawa Ienobu, Japanese Edo shōgun (b. 1662)
- November 15
  - James Hamilton, 4th Duke of Hamilton, Scottish peer (b. 1658)
  - Charles Mohun, 4th Baron Mohun, English politician (b. 1675)
- November 19 – Wolfgang Carl Briegel, German organist and composer (b. 1626)
- November 20 – Humphrey Humphreys, British bishop (b. 1648)
- November 26 – Pietro Dandini, Italian painter (b. 1646)
- November 30 – Sir Henry Furnese, 1st Baronet, English merchant and politician (b. 1658)
- William Joliffe, English politician (b. 1622)

1713

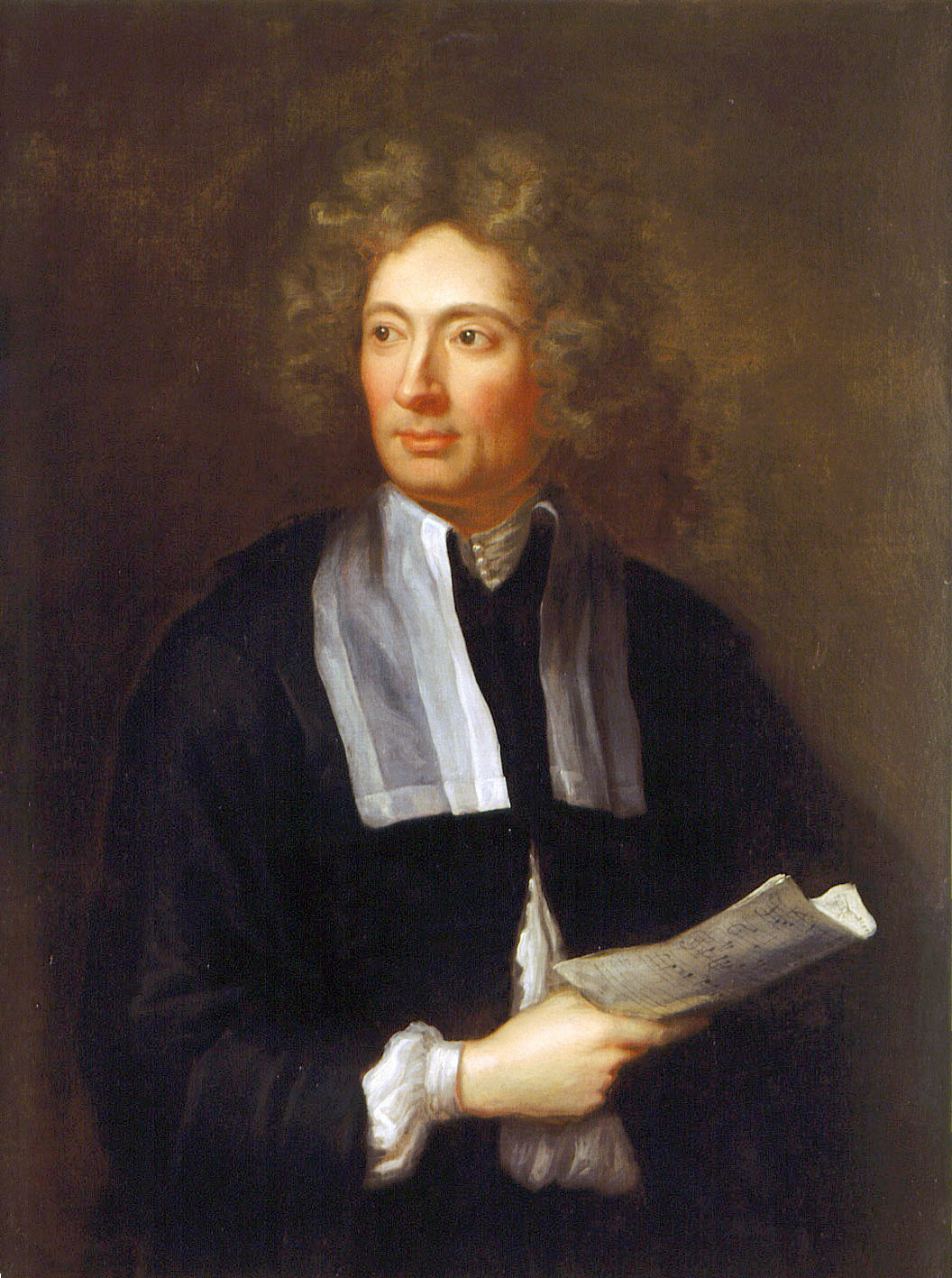
Arcangelo Corelli died 8 January

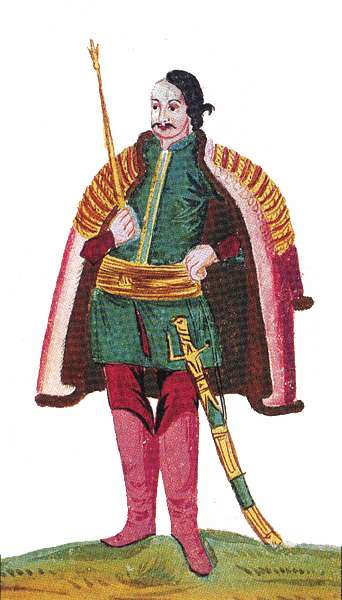
Michael II Apafi died 1 February

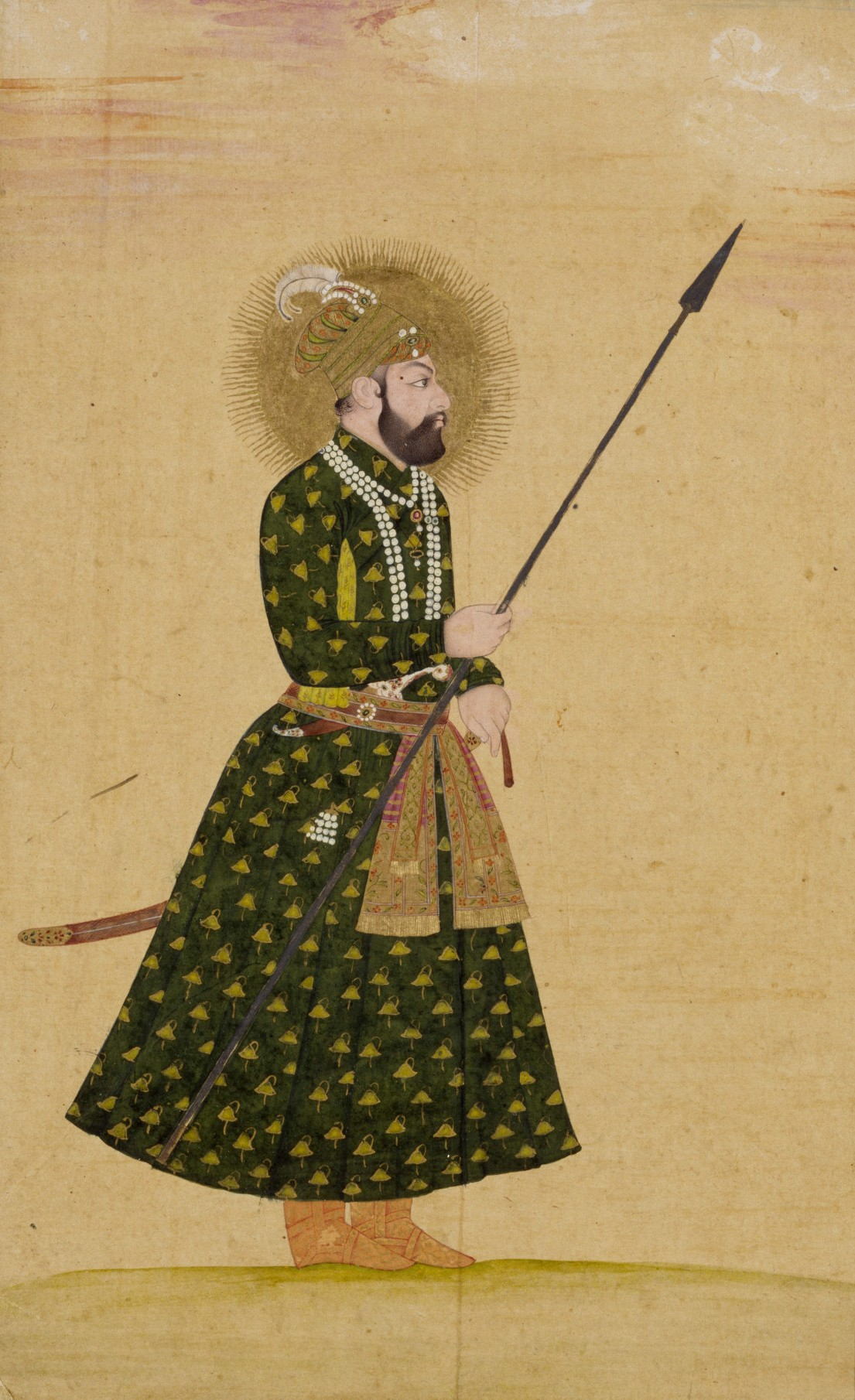
Jahandar Shah died 12 February

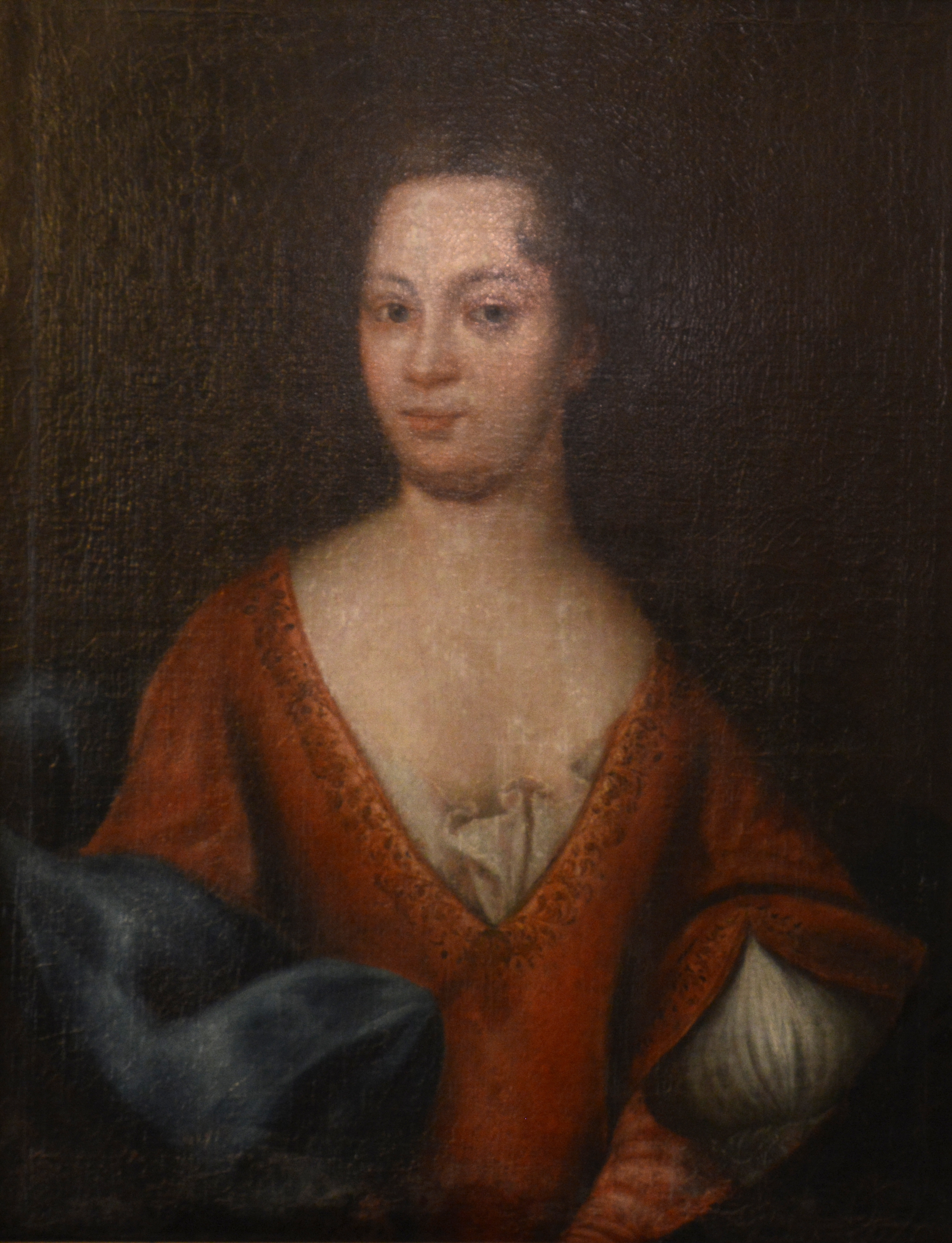
Anne Clausdatter died 11 April

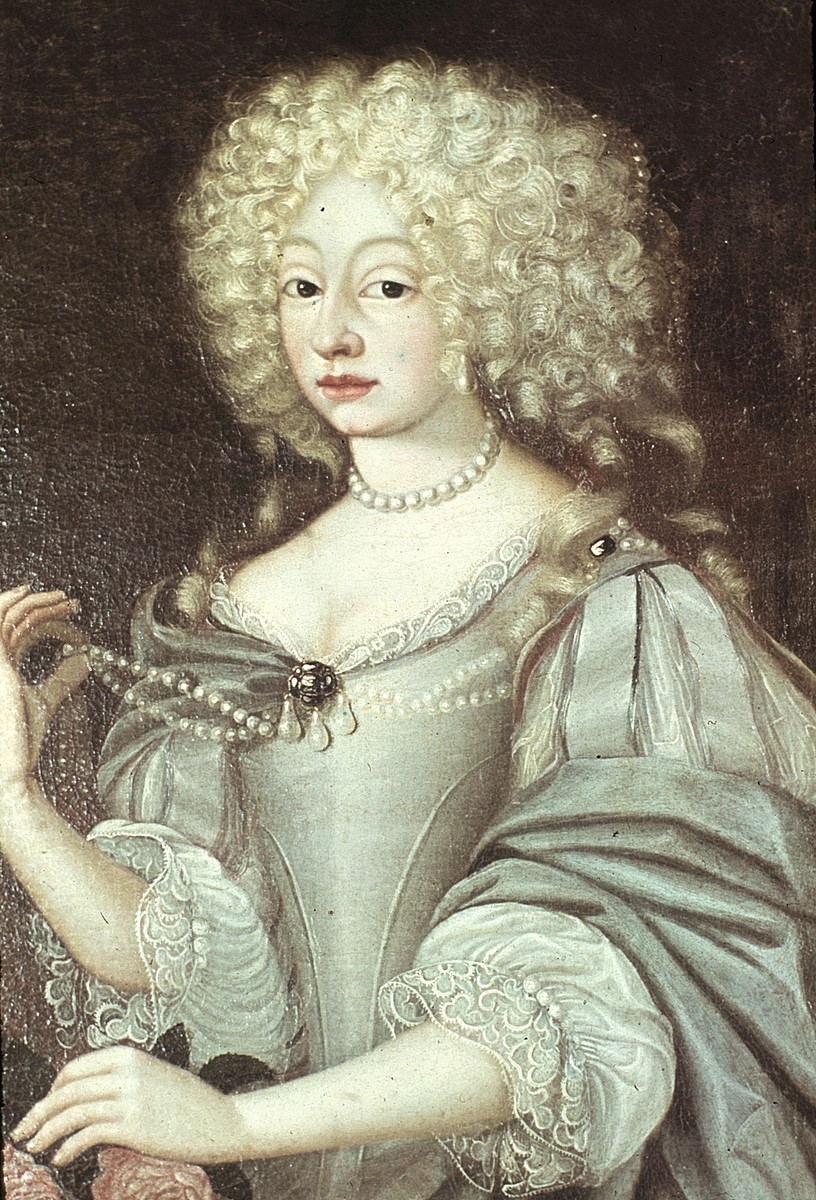
Dorothea Marie of Saxe-Gotha-Altenburg died 18 April

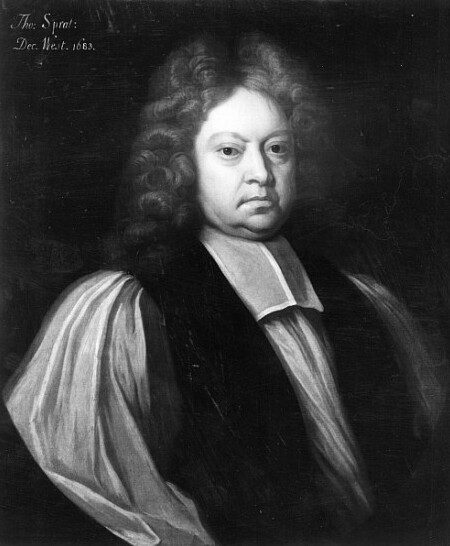
Thomas Sprat died 20 May

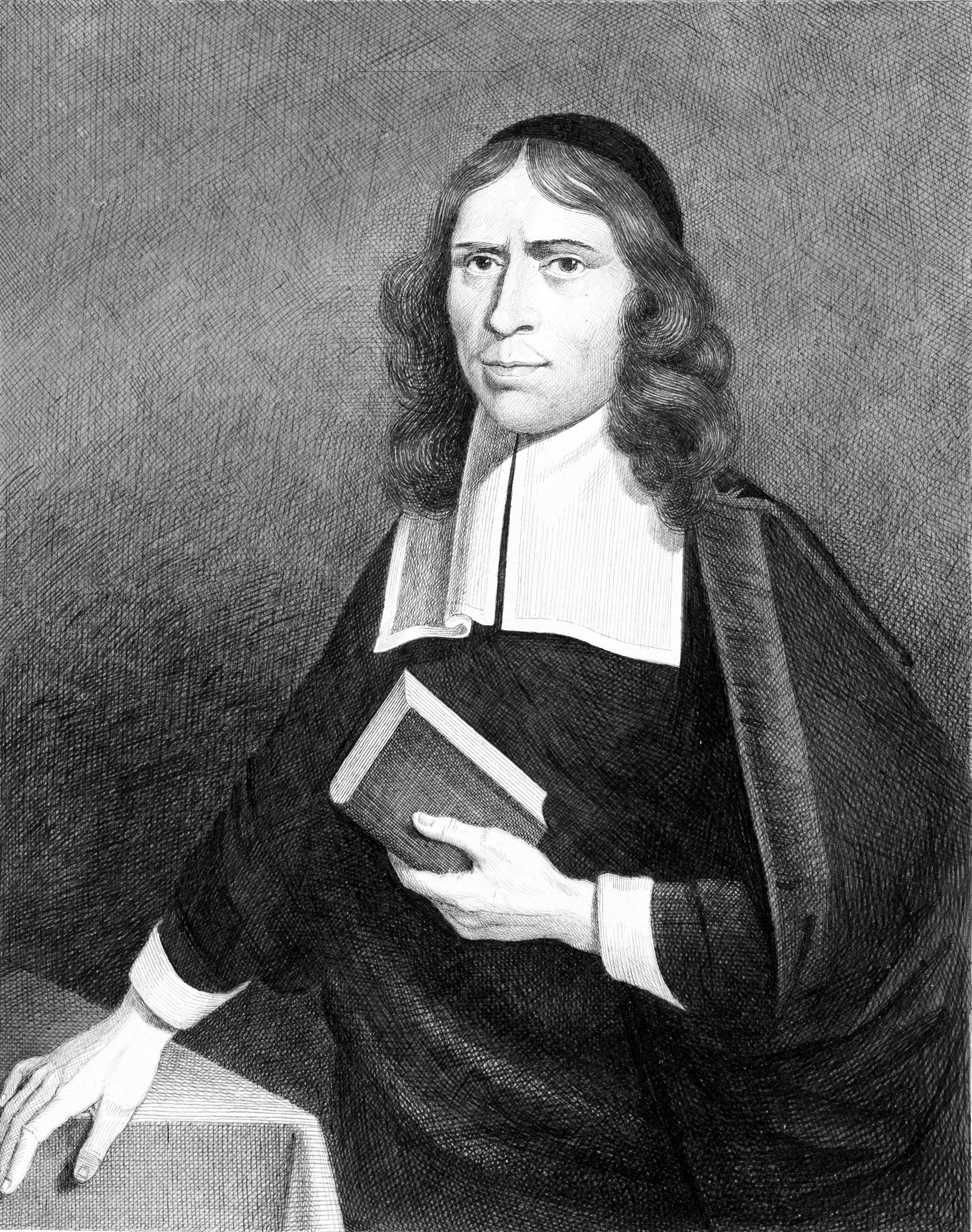
Georg Otho died 28 May

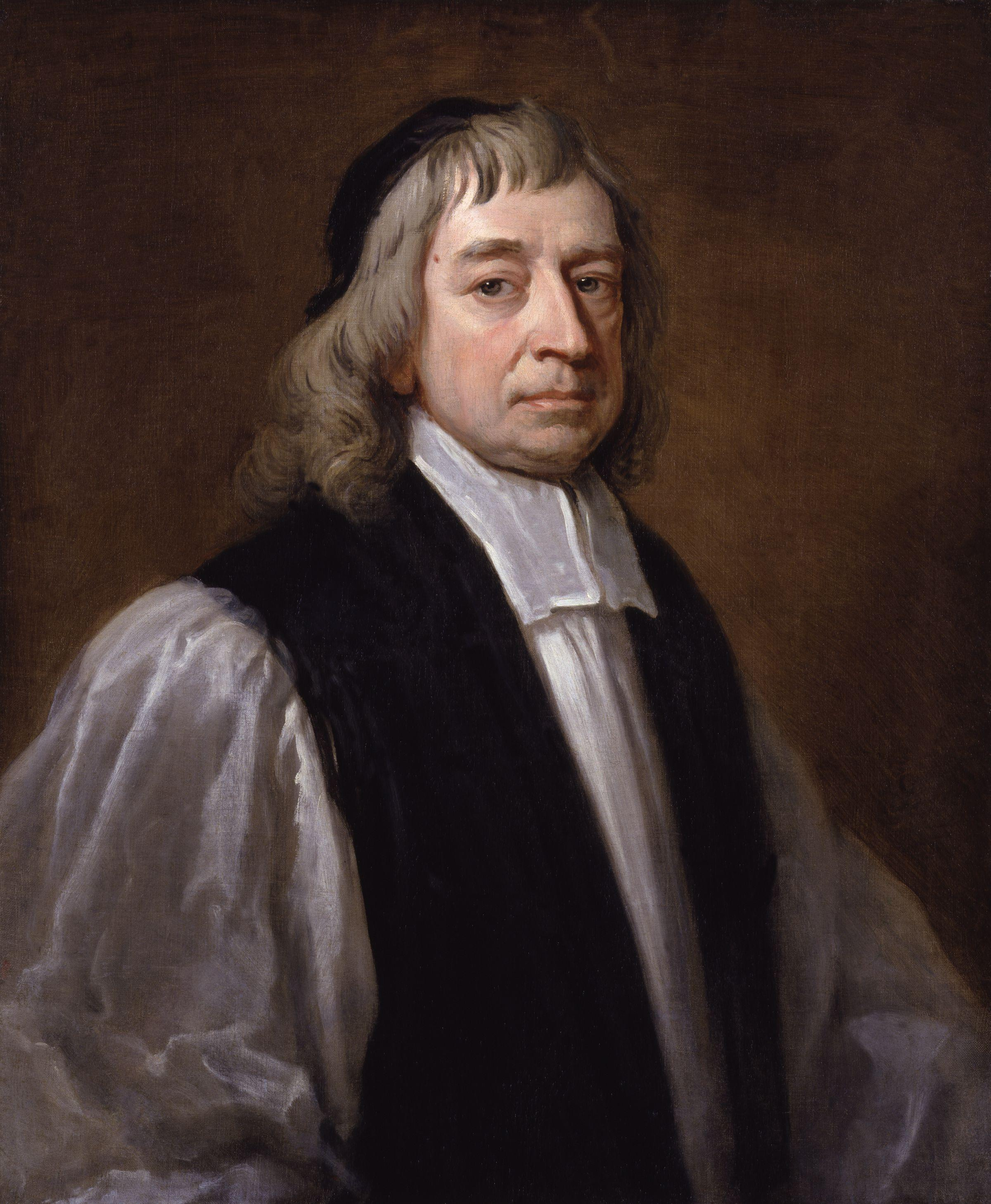
Henry Compton (bishop) died 7 July

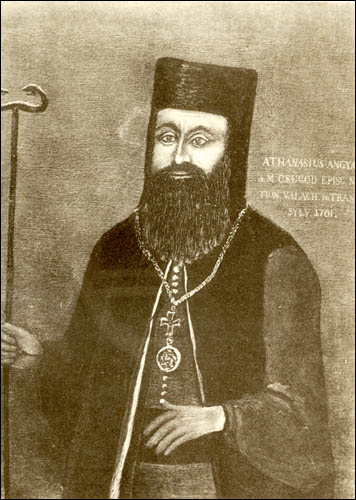
Atanasie Anghel died 19 August

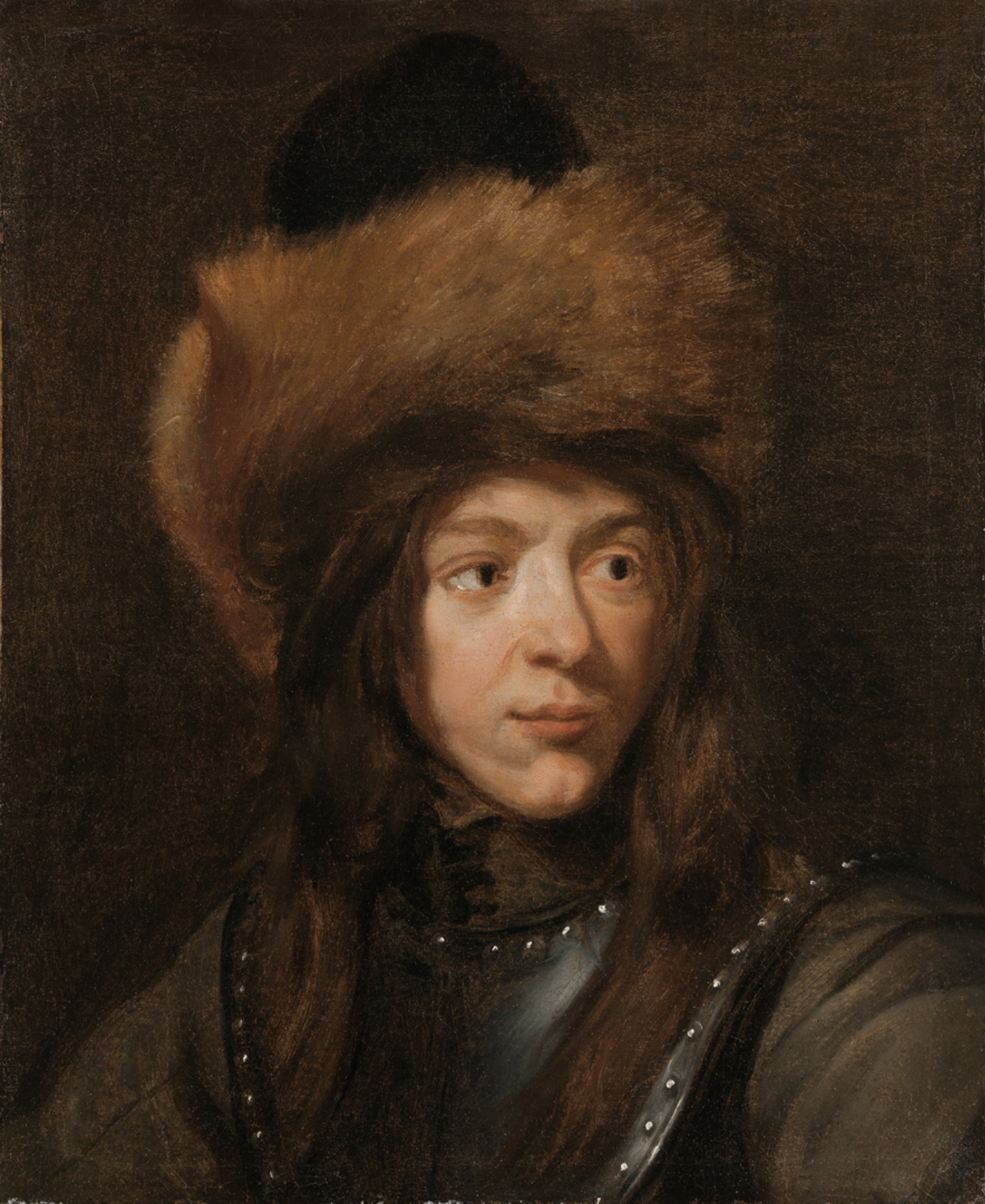
Jacob van Oost the Younger died 29 September

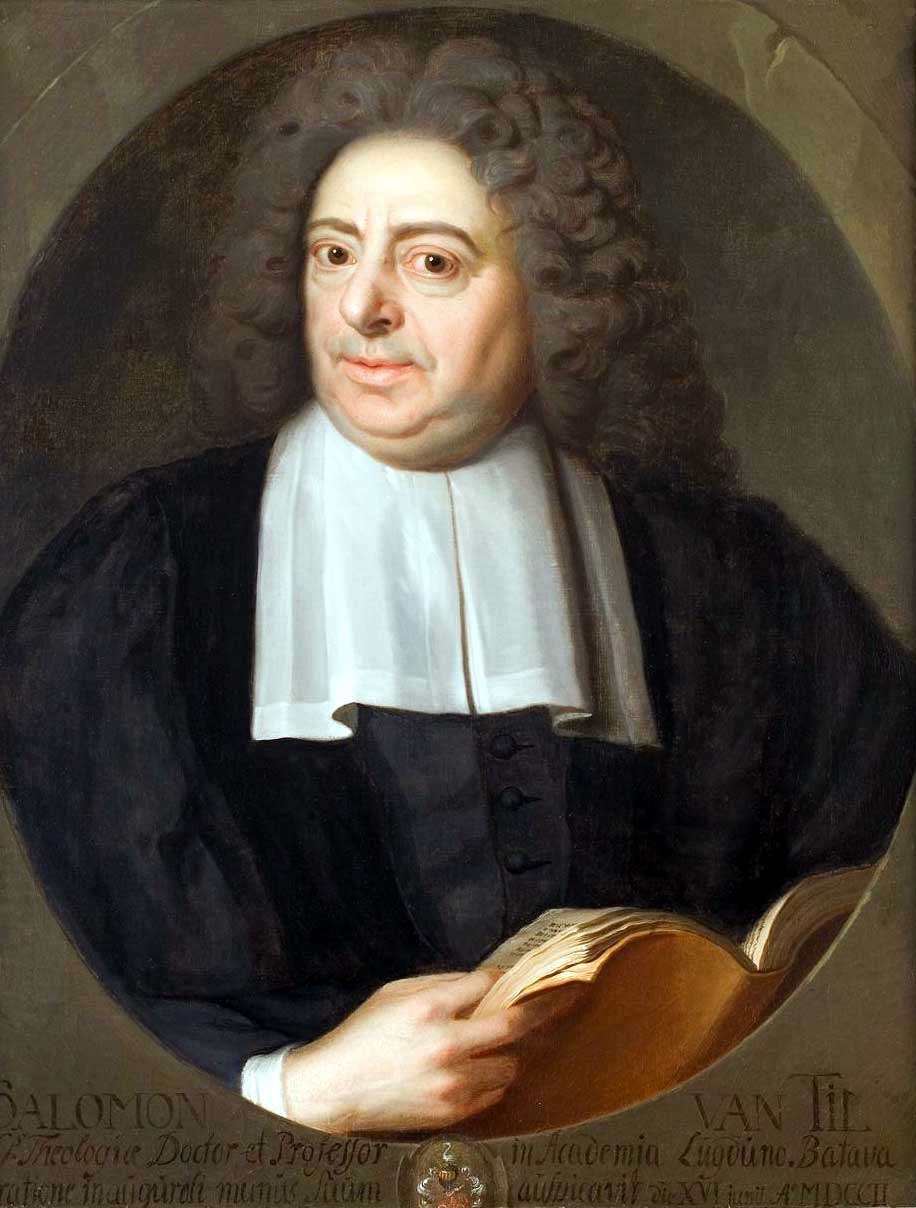
Salomon van Til died 31 October

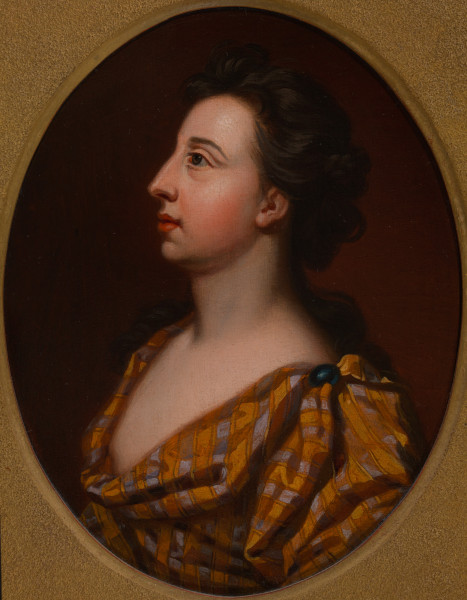
Elizabeth Barry died 7 November

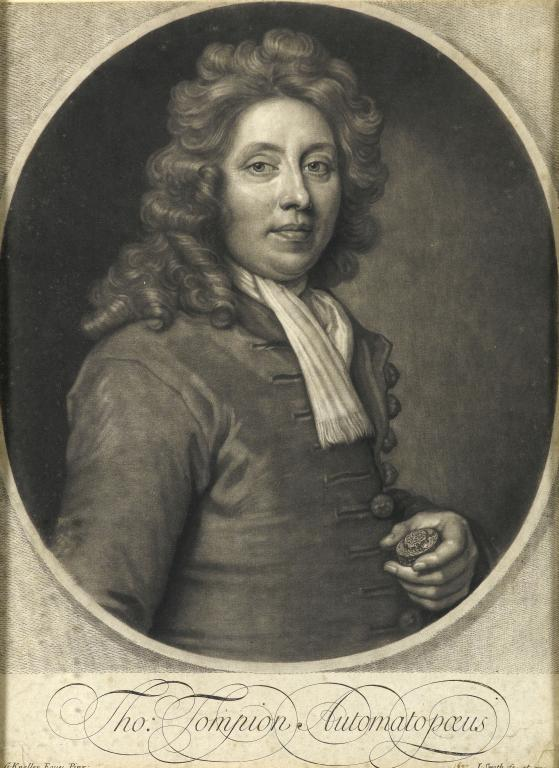
Thomas Tompion died 20 November

- January 1
  - Giovanni Francesco Negroni, Italian cardinal (b. 1629)
  - Giuseppe Maria Tomasi, Italian Roman Catholic cardinal (b. 1649)
- January 2 – Lady Mary Butler, British noble; (b. 1689)
- January 5 – Jean Chardin, French jeweler, traveler and author (b. 1643)
- January 8 – Arcangelo Corelli, Italian violinist and composer (b. 1653)
- January 11 – Pierre Jurieu, French Protestant leader (b. 1637)
- January 12 – John Vaughan, 3rd Earl of Carbery, Governor of Jamaica, President of the British Royal Society (b. 1639)
- January 20 – Pavao Ritter Vitezović, Croatian writer, historian, linguist and publisher (b. 1652)
- January 26 – Scrope Howe, 1st Viscount Howe, English politician (b. 1648)
- February 1 – Michael II Apafi, Prince of Transylvania (b. 1676)
- February 2 – Marko Mesić, Croatian Roman Catholic priest (b. 1640)
- February 3 – William Milman, English lawyer (b. 1650)
- February 4 – Anthony Ashley-Cooper, 3rd Earl of Shaftesbury, English politician and philosopher (b. 1671)
- February 11 – Zulfiqar Khan Nusrat Jung, Nawab of the Carnatic (b. 1657)
- February 12
  - Florence MacMoyer, last hereditary keeper of the Book of Armagh, (b. 1630)
  - Jahandar Shah, Mughal emperor (b. 1661)
  - Michele Antonio Vibò, Roman Catholic prelate, Archbishop of Turin, Apostolic Internuncio to France (b. 1630)
- February 14
  - Louis Crato, Count of Nassau-Saarbrücken (b. 1663)
  - William Harrison, English poet and diplomat (b. 1685)
- February 15 – Carlo Vigarani, Italian scenic designer (b. 1637)
- February 25 – King Frederick I of Prussia (b. 1657)
- February 26 – William Paget, 6th Baron Paget, English peer and ambassador (b. 1637)
- February 28 – Samuel Whiting Jr., American clergyman 1633–1713 (b. 1633)
- March 4 – Ireneo della Croce, Carmelite preacher and chronicler (b. 1625)
- March 14 – Mary Cromwell, Countess Fauconberg, daughter of Oliver Cromwell (b. 1637)
- March 15 – Wolfgang William Romer, Dutch military engineer (b. 1640)
- March 17 – Juraj Jánošík, Slovak outlaw, known as the Slovak Robin Hood (executed) (b. 1688)
- March 20 – Owen Buckingham, MP and Lord Mayor of London (b. 1649)
- March 21 – Feodor Lopukhin, Russian lawyer, nobleman, colonel, courtier and Boyar (b. 1638)
- March 22 – Robert Petre, 7th Baron Petre, British peer (b. 1689)
- March 24 – Toussaint de Forbin-Janson, French Catholic cardinal and Bishop of Beauvais (b. 1631)
- March 26
  - Paul I, Prince Esterházy, Palatine of Hungary and Prince of Holy Roman Empire (b. 1635)
  - Charles de Sévigné, French baron (b. 1648)
- March 29 – Christian Thomsen Carl, Danish naval officer (b. 1676)
- March 30 – Govert Bidloo, Dutch physician, anatomist, poet and playwright (b. 1649)
- April 3 – Henri, Count of Brionne, French noble (b. 1661)
- April 8
  - Leonardo Marsili, Roman Catholic archbishop (b. 1641)
  - Lucas Smout the Younger, Flemish painter (b. 1671)
- April 11 – Anne Clausdatter, Norwegian businesswoman (b. 1659)
- April 15 – Valentin Molitor, Swiss composer (b. 1637)
- April 17 – David Hollatz, German theologian (b. 1648)
- April 18 – Dorothea Marie of Saxe-Gotha-Altenburg, German princess (b. 1674)
- April 20 – John Hay, 2nd Marquess of Tweeddale, Scottish nobleman (b. 1645)
- April 21 – Paolo Naldini, Roman Catholic prelate, Bishop of Capodistria (b. 1632)
- April 24 – Edmund Meyrick, Welsh cleric (b. 1636)
- April 27 – Marie Elisabeth zu Mecklenburg, princess of Mecklenburg-Schwerin (b. 1646)
- May 3 – Salathiel Lovell, British judge (b. 1631)
- May 15 – Giuseppe Antonio Torri, architect (b. 1655)
- May 19 – Samuel Keeler, Connecticut politician (b. 1656)
- May 20 – Thomas Sprat, English minister (b. 1635)
- May 28 – Georg Otho, German librarian (b. 1634)
- June 11 – Felix Meyer, painter from Switzerland (b. 1653)
- July 7 – Henry Compton, Bishop of Oxford; Bishop of London (b. 1632)
- July 11 – Joseph Stennett, English Baptist minister and hymnwriter (b. 1663)
- July 25 – Thomas Northmore, English Member of Parliament (b. 1643)
- July 31 – Frederick William, Duke of Mecklenburg-Schwerin (b. 1675)
- August 2 – Artus de Lionne, French missionary (b. 1655)
- August 4 – William Cave, English cleric and scholar (b. 1637)
- August 10 – Giovanni Battista Visconti Aicardi, Roman Catholic prelate (b. 1644)
- August 15 – Kujō Morotaka, Japanese noble (b. 1688)
- August 19 – Atanasie Anghel, Romanian Greek-Catholic bishop of Alba Iulia (b. 1660)
- August 26 (bur.) – Denis Papin, French inventor (b. 1647)
- September 5 – Ivan Andreyevich Tolstoy, Russian noble (b. 1644)
- September 6 – François-Séraphin Régnier-Desmarais, French diplomat and writer (b. 1632)
- September 8 – Livio Odescalchi, Italian noble (b. 1652)
- September 9
  - Giovanni Antonio Viscardi, Swiss architect (b. 1645)
  - Johannes Voet, Dutch legal scholar (b. 1647)
- September 14 – Ōkubo Tadamasu, daimyo (b. 1656)
- September 15 – Tokugawa Yoshimichi, daimyo (b. 1689)
- September 20 – Francisco Martín Fernández de Posadas, Spanish presbyter (b. 1644)
- September 21 – Charles Fox, English politician (b. 1660)
- September 22 – Yurij Vynnyckyj, Metropolitan of Kiev (b. 1660)
- September 29 – Jacob van Oost the Younger, Flemish Baroque painter (b. 1639)
- October 5 – Charles Schomberg, Marquess of Harwich, British Army officer and noble (b. 1683)
- October 14 – Johan de la Faille, Dutch art collector (b. 1628)
- October 15 – Johann Michael Feuchtmayer the Elder, German artist (b. 1666)
- October 17 – Ambrose Crowley, English ironmonger (b. 1658)
- October 18 – Tripo Kokolja, Venetian painter (b. 1661)
- October 20 – Archibald Pitcairne, Scottish physician (b. 1652)
- October 22 – Sir John Cropley, 2nd Baronet, English politician (b. 1663)
- October 28 – Paolo Lorenzani, Italian composer (b. 1640)
- October 31
  - Ferdinando de' Medici, Grand Prince of Tuscany, Tuscan prince (b. 1663)
  - Salomon van Til, Dutch theologian (b. 1643)
- November 2 – Narcissus Marsh, English clergyman (b. 1638)
- November 6 – Franz Karl of Auersperg, Prince of Auersperg, Duke of Münsterberg (b. 1660)
- November 7 – Elizabeth Barry, British actress (b. 1658)
- November 8
  - Samuel Angier, English minister (b. 1639)
  - Fredrik Bagge, Swedish priest (b. 1646)
- November 9 – Armand Charles de La Porte de La Meilleraye, French general (b. 1632)
- November 17 – Abraham van Riebeeck, Governor-General of the Dutch East Indies (b. 1653)
- November 18 – Charles Hickman, Anglican Bishop of Derry (b. 1648)
- November 20 – Thomas Tompion, British clockmaker (b. 1638)
- November 26 – John Belding, Connecticut politician (b. 1650)
- November 30 – Nishio Tadanari, daimyo (b. 1653)
- December 1 – Richard Lowther, 2nd Viscount Lonsdale, English noble (b. 1692)
- December 2 – Gershom Bulkeley, Christian minister, physician, surgeon, magistrate (b. 1636)
- December 3 – Noadiah Russell, one of the clergymen who founded Yale (b. 1659)
- December 4 – François Pétis de la Croix, French orientalist (b. 1653)
- December 5 – Tokugawa Gorōta, daimyo (b. 1711)
- December 14
  - Feodosia Alekseyevna of Russia, Tsarevna of Russia (b. 1662)
  - Thomas Rymer, English Historiographer royal (b. 1641)
- December 15
  - Frederik Johan van Baer, Dutch army commander (b. 1645)
  - Carlo Maratta, Italian painter (b. 1625)
- December 17 – Nicolò Beregan, Italian noble and singer (b. 1627)
- December 18 – Frederick Henry, Duke of Saxe-Zeitz-Pegau-Neustadt, German Duke (b. 1668)
- December 31 – Edward Proger, Member of Parliament for Brecknockshire (b. 1621)
- date unknown
  - Basil Lazarus III, Syriac Orthodox Maphrian of the East
  - Thomas Ellwood, English religious writer (b. 1639)

1714

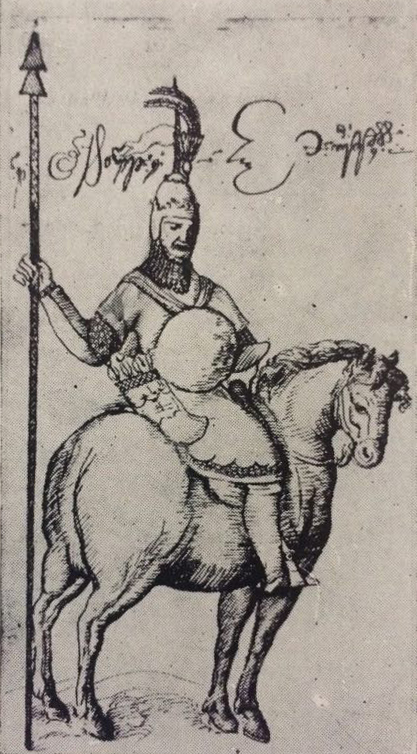
Prince Mamia III Gurieli

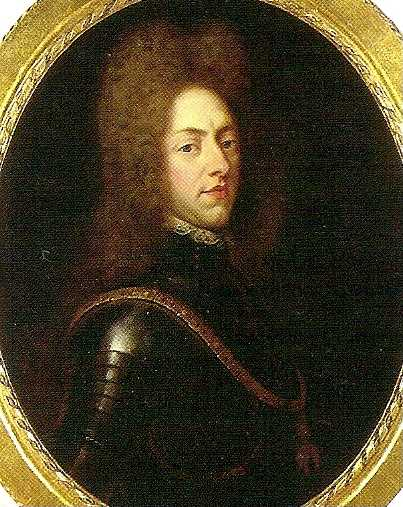
Eugen Alexander Franz

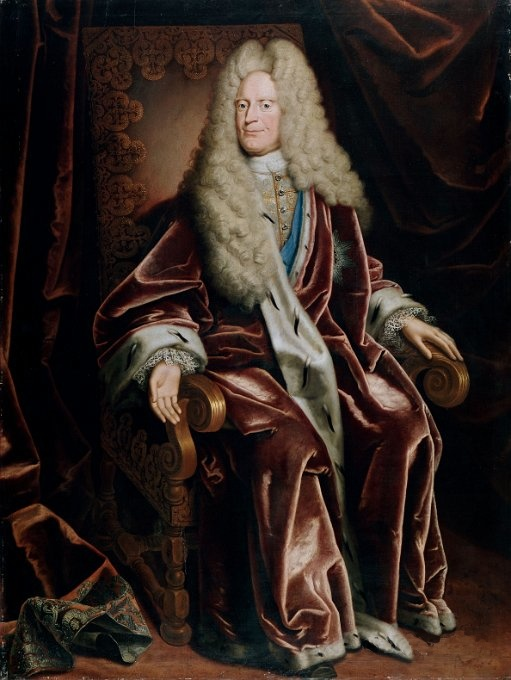
Anthony Ulrich, Duke of Brunswick-Wolfenbüttel

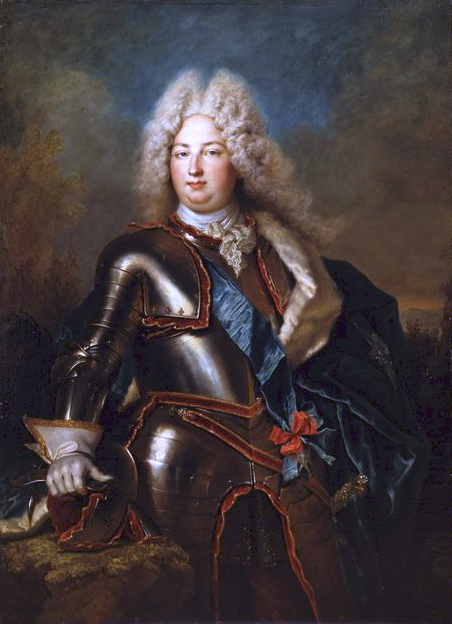
Charles, Duke of Berry

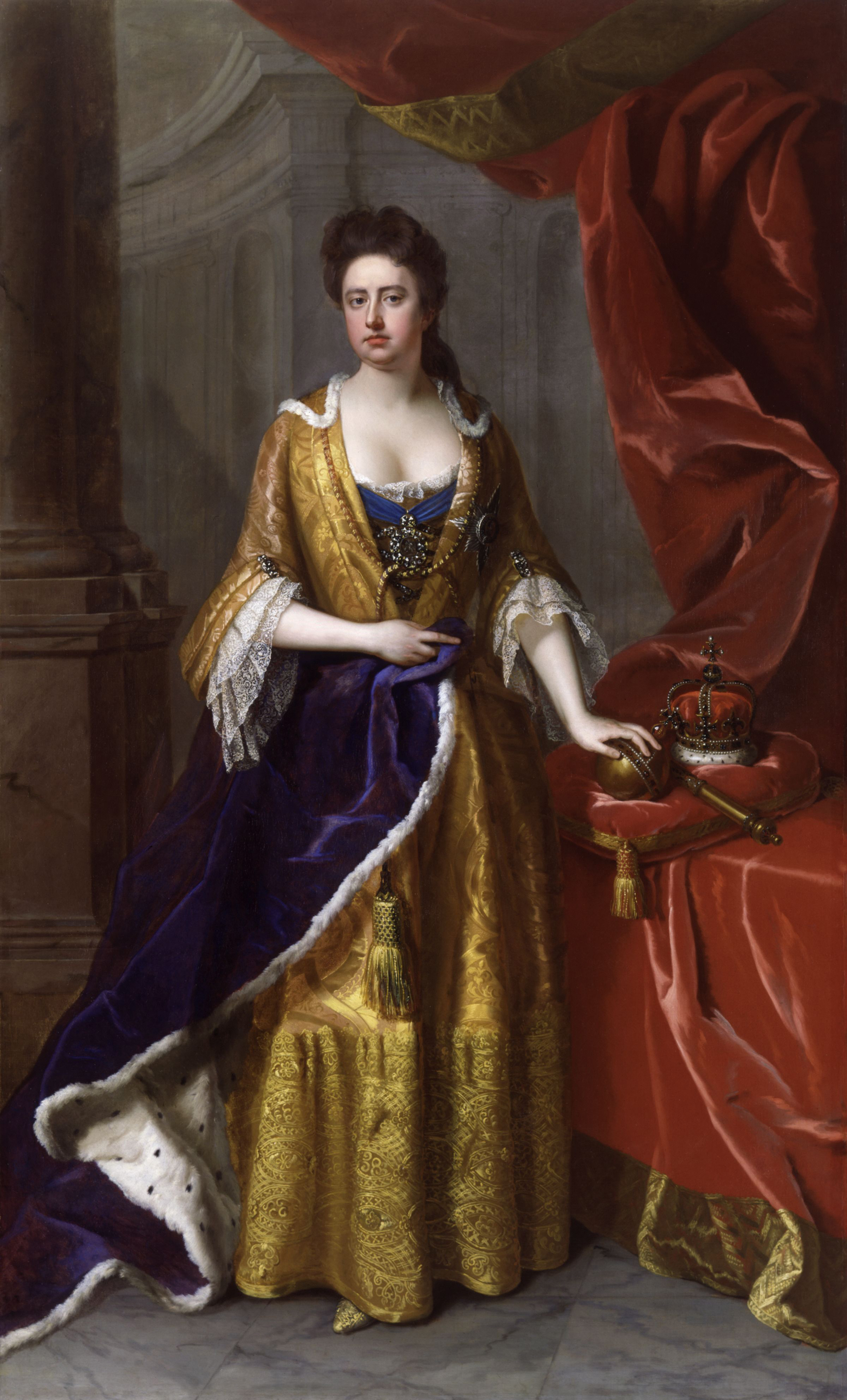
Anne, Queen of Great Britain

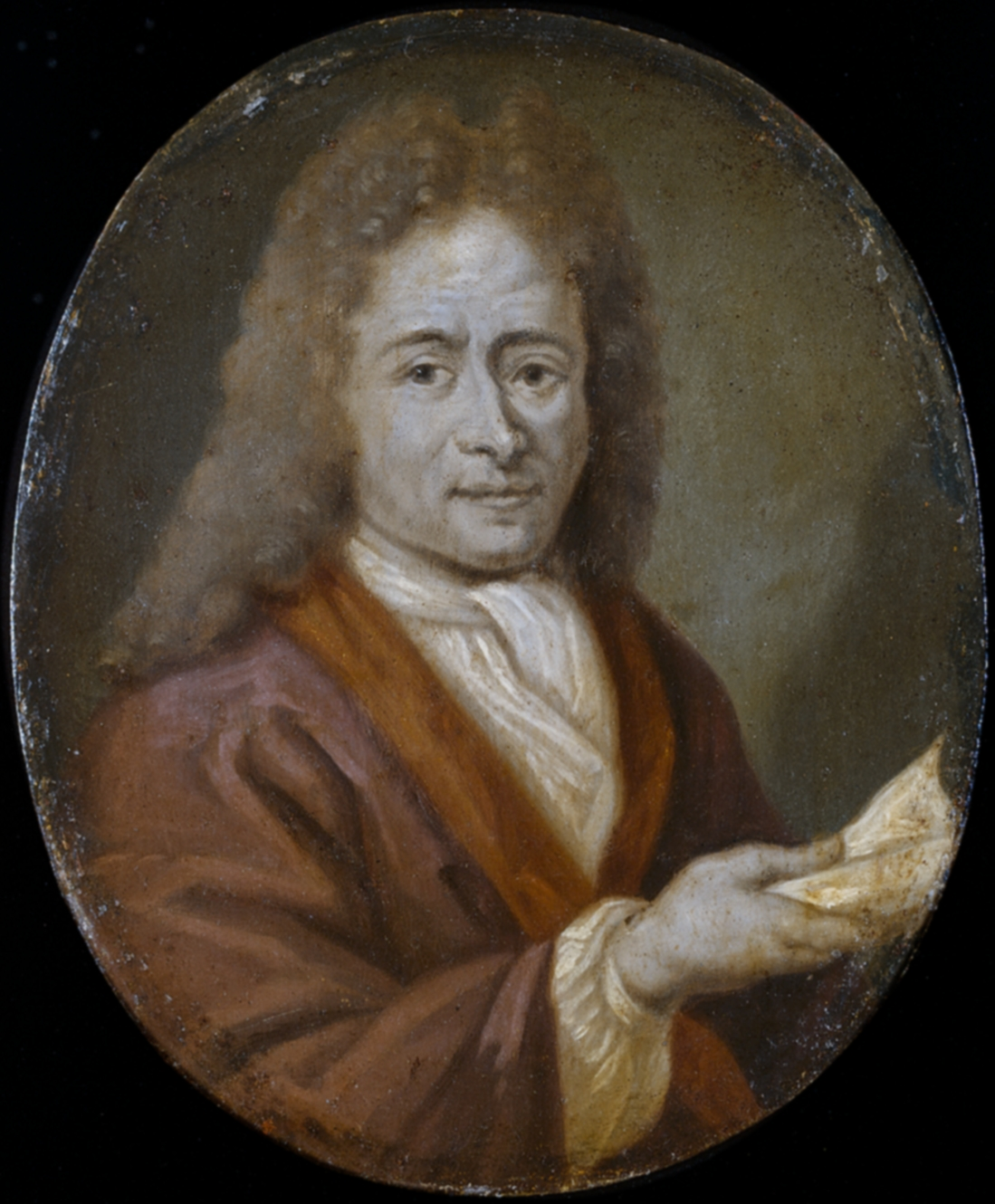
Christoffel Pierson

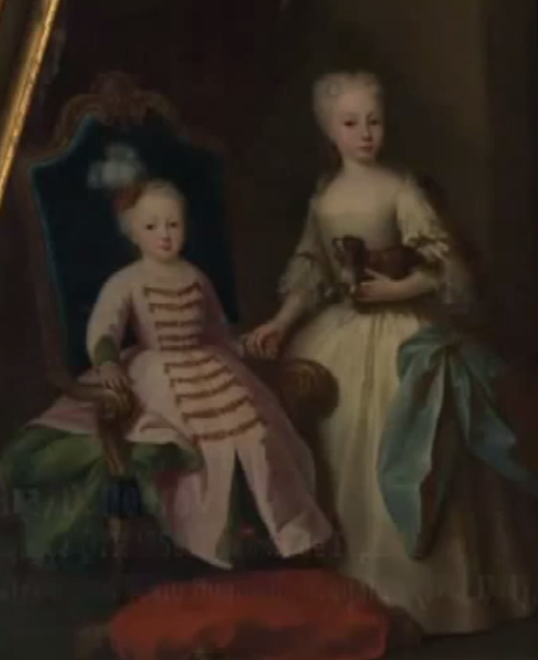
Pedro, Prince of Brazil

- January 4 – Atto Melani, Italian opera singer (b. 1626)
- January 5 – Mamia III Gurieli, Prince of Guria
- January 10 – Constantin Ranst de Jonge, son of Hieronimus Rans(t) (1607–1660) (b. 1635)
- January 17 – Gabriel Álvarez de Toledo, Royal Librarian of King Felipe V of Spain (b. 1662)
- February 2 – John Sharp, English Archbishop of Yorkshire (b. 1643)
- February 21 – Eugen Alexander Franz, 1st Prince of Thurn and Taxis (b. 1652)
- February 24 – Edmund Andros, English governor in North America (b. 1637)
- March 3 – Hans Carl von Carlowitz, German forester (b. 1645)
- March 13 – John Talbot of Lacock, British politician and general (b. 1630)
- March 27
  - Charlotte Amalie of Hesse-Kassel, Queen Consort of Denmark (1670–1699) (b. 1650)
  - Anthony Ulrich, Duke of Brunswick-Wolfenbüttel (b. 1633)
- April 10 – Samuel Carpenter, Deputy Governor of colonial Pennsylvania (b. 1649)
- April 15 – Esther Liebmann, German banker (b. 1649)
- April 17
  - Philipp Heinrich Erlebach, German composer (b. 1657)
  - Haquin Spegel, Swedish bishop (b. 1645)
- May 5 – Charles, Duke of Berry, grandson of Louis XIV of France (b. 1686)
- May 15 – Roger Elliott, British general and Governor of Gibraltar (b. c. 1665)
- May 18 – Ivan Botsis, Russian admiral of Greek origin (unknown birth date)
- May 24 – Henry Somerset, 2nd Duke of Beaufort (b. 1684)
- May 27 – George Saunderson, 5th Viscount Castleton, English Member of Parliament (b. 1631)
- May 30 – Gottfried Arnold, German church historian (b. 1666)
- June 8 – Electress Sophia of Hanover, heir to the throne of Great Britain (b. 1630)
- June 22 – Matthew Henry, English non-conformist minister (b. 1662)
- June 28 – Daniel Papebroch, Flemish Jesuit hagiographer (b. 1628)
- July 4 – Antonio Magliabechi, Italian librarian (b. 1633)
- August 1 – Anne, Queen of Great Britain (b. 1665)
- August 11 – Christoffel Pierson, Dutch painter (b. 1631)
- August 26 – Constantin Brâncoveanu, Prince of Wallachia (b. 1654)
- August 26 – Edward Fowler, English Bishop of Gloucester (b. 1632)
- September 20 – Anna Waser, Swiss painter (b. 1678)
- September 27 – Thomas Britton, English concert promoter (b. 1644)
- October – Raja Sitaram Ray, autonomous king, vassal of the Mughal Empire (b. 1658)
- October 3 – Jeanne Le Ber, religious recluse in New France (b. 1662)
- October 5 – Kaibara Ekiken, Japanese philosopher (b. 1630)
- October 10 – Pierre Le Pesant, sieur de Boisguilbert, French economist (b. 1646)
- October 25 – Sébastien Leclerc, French painter (b. 1637)
- October 29 – Pedro, Prince of Brazil, second child of John V of Portugal and Maria Ana of Austria (b. 1712)
- November 5 – Bernardino Ramazzini, Italian physician (b. 1633)
- November 7 – Charles Davenant, English economist, politician and pamphleteer (b. 1656)
- November 8 – Filippo II Colonna, Italian noble (b. 1663)
- November 29 – Jerolim Kavanjin, Croatian poet (b. 1641)
- December 10 – Anthony Günther, Prince of Anhalt-Zerbst (b. 1653)
- December 29 – Charles Churchill, British general (b. 1656)
- December 30 – François Adhémar de Monteil, Comte de Grignan, French aristocrat (b. 1632)
- date unknown – Julianna Géczy, Hungarian heroine (b. 1680)

1715

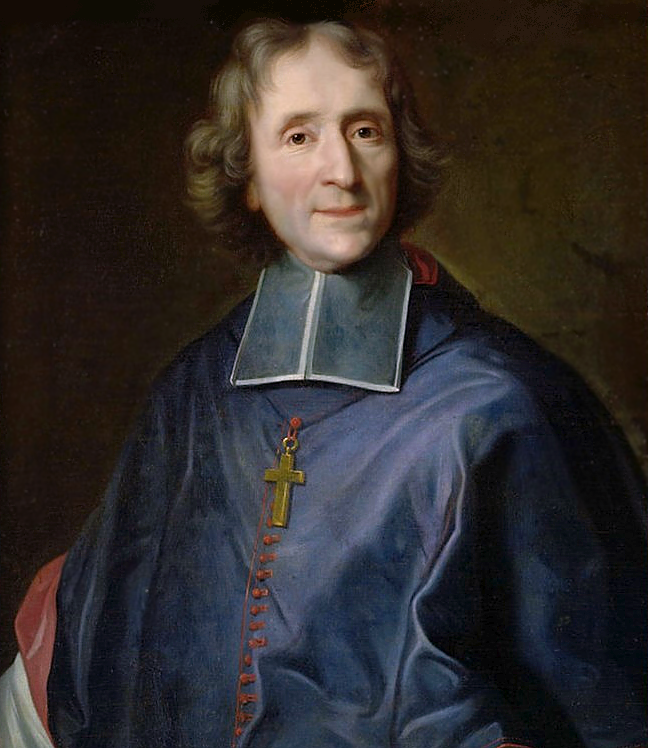
François Fénelon

- January 7
  - François Fénelon, Archbishop of Cambrai (b. 1651)
  - Mary Somerset, Duchess of Beaufort, British botanist (b. 1630)
- January 29 – Bernard Lamy, French Oratorian mathematician and theologian (b. 1640)
- January 27 – Caspar Neumann, German professor and clergyman (b. 1648)
- February 3 – Gottfried Vopelius, German academic (b. 1645)
- February 4 – Martín de Ursúa, Spanish conquistador (b. 1653)
- February 17 – Antoine Galland, French archaeologist (b. 1646)
- February 19 – Domenico Egidio Rossi, Italian architect (b. 1659)
- February 21 – Charles Calvert, 3rd Baron Baltimore, Colonial governor of Maryland (b. 1637)
- February 25 – Pu Songling, Qing Dynasty Chinese writer (b. 1640)
- March 2 – Cardinal de Bouillon, French Catholic cardinal (b. 1643)
- March 17 – Gilbert Burnet, Scottish Bishop of Salisbury (b. 1643)
- March 18 – William Fraser, 12th Lord Saltoun, (b.1654)
- March 27 – August, Duke of Saxe-Merseburg-Zörbig, German prince (b. 1655)

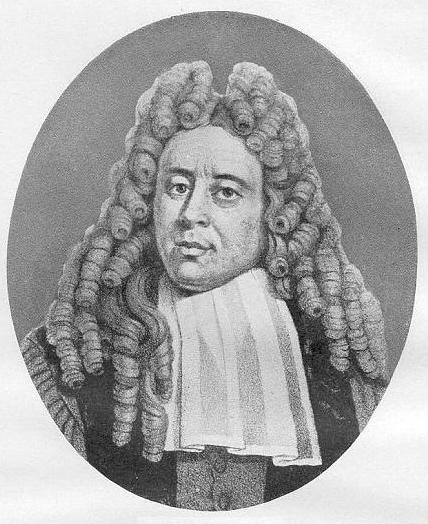
Perizonius

- April 6 – Perizonius, Dutch linguist (b. 1651)
- April 16 – Benedict Calvert, 4th Baron Baltimore, Colonial governor of Maryland (b. 1679)
- May 8 – Marie Mancini, Italian courtier, third of the five Mancini sisters (b. 1639)
- May 19 – Charles Montagu, English Chancellor of the Exchequer (b. 1661)
- May 21 – Pierre Magnol, French botanist (b. 1638)
- May 30 – Roeloff Swartwout, American city founder in New York (b. 1634)
- June 19 – Nicolas Lemery, French chemist (b. 1645)
- June 25 – Jean-Baptiste du Casse, French admiral and buccaneer (b. 1646)
- July 5 – Charles Ancillon, French Huguenot pastor (b. 1659)
- July 28 – Jakub Kresa, Czech mathematician (b. 1648)
- July 30 – Nahum Tate, Irish poet (b. 1652)
- August 21 – Countess Johanna Magdalene of Hanau-Lichtenberg, German countess (b. 1660)
- September 1
  - François Girardon, French sculptor (b. 1628)
  - King Louis XIV of France (b. 1638)

Louis XIV of France

- September 24 – Wilhelm Homberg, Dutch alchemist (b. 1652)
- October 13 – Nicolas Malebranche, French philosopher (b. 1638)
- October 14 – Thomas Tenison, Archbishop of Canterbury (b. 1636)
- October 15 – Humphry Ditton, English mathematician (b. 1675)
- October 17 – Ernest, Duke of Saxe-Hildburghausen (b. 1655)
- October 30 – Juliane Louise of East Frisia, Princess of East Frisia (b. 1657)
- October 31 – Elisha Cooke, Sr., Massachusetts colonial politician and judge (b. 1637)
- November – Mirwais Hotak, Pashtun emir, and founder of the Hotaki Dynasty (b. 1673)
- November 24 – Hedwig Eleonora of Holstein-Gottorp, queen consort of King Charles X of Sweden (b. 1636)
- December 9 – Benedetto Gennari II, Italian painter (b. 1633)
- December 15 – George Hickes, English minister and scholar (b. 1642)
- December 28
  - William Carstares, Scottish clergyman (b. 1649)
  - Joanna Koerten, Dutch painter (b. 1650)
- date unknown – Elizabeth Boutell, British stage actor (b. 1650)

1716 * January 1 – William Wycherley, English playwright (b. 1641)

- January 18 – Sir Robert Burdett, 3rd Baronet, English politician (b. 1640)
- January 30 – Marie Casimire Louise de La Grange d'Arquien, French-born Polish consort to King John III Sobieski (b. 1641)
- February 2 – Juan Domingo de Zuñiga y Fonseca, Spanish Governor of the Habsburg Netherlands (b. 1640)
- February 19 – Dorothe Engelbretsdotter, Norway's first professional female author (b. 1634)
- March 26 – Johann Friedrich Gleditsch, German book publisher (b. 1653)
- March 28 – John Vesey, Irish archbishop (b. 1638)
- April 14 – Arthur Herbert, 1st Earl of Torrington, British admiral (b. c. 1648)
- April 26 – John Somers, 1st Baron Somers, Lord Chancellor of England (b. 1651)
- April 28 – Saint Louis de Montfort, author, True Devotion to Mary (b. 1673)
- April 29 – Sir Richard Myddelton, 3rd Baronet, English politician (b. 1655)
- May 11 – Francis de Geronimo, Italian priest (b. 1642)
- May 14 – Henry Oxburgh, executed Irish Jacobite leader

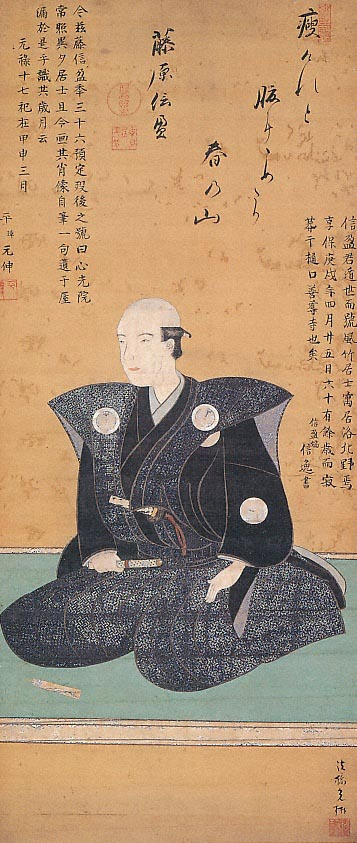
Painting by Ogata Kōrin.

- June 2 – Ogata Kōrin, Japanese painter (b. c. 1657)
- June 5 – Roger Cotes, English mathematician and philosopher (b. 1682)
- June 8 – Johann Wilhelm, Elector Palatine (b. 1658)
- June 9 – Banda Bahadur, Sikh military commander (executed) (b. 1670)
- June 19 – Tokugawa Ietsugu, 7th Tokugawa shogunate of Japan (b. 1709)
- June 28 – George FitzRoy, 1st Duke of Northumberland, English general (b. 1665)
- July 8 – Robert South, English churchman (b. 1634)
- July 9 – Joseph Sauveur, French mathematician (b. 1653)
- July 14 – Edward Lee, 1st Earl of Lichfield, English peer (b. 1663)
- July 26 – Paolo Alessandro Maffei, Italian antiquarian, humanist (b. 1653)
- August 5 – Silahtar Ali Pasha, Ottoman (Turkish) grand vizier (b. 1667)
- August 6 – Frederick Augustus, Duke of Württemberg-Neuenstadt (b. 1654)
- September 25 – Johann Christoph Pez, German composer (b. 1664)
- October 17 – Anne Hamilton, 3rd Duchess of Hamilton, Scottish peeress (b. 1631)
- October 28 – Stephen Fox, English politician (b. 1627)
- October 10 – Anton Egon, Prince of Fürstenberg-Heiligenberg, Governor of the Electorate of Saxony (b. 1656)
- November 2 – Engelbert Kaempfer, German traveler, physician (b. 1651)
- November 9 – Maria, Curaçaoan slave rebel leader

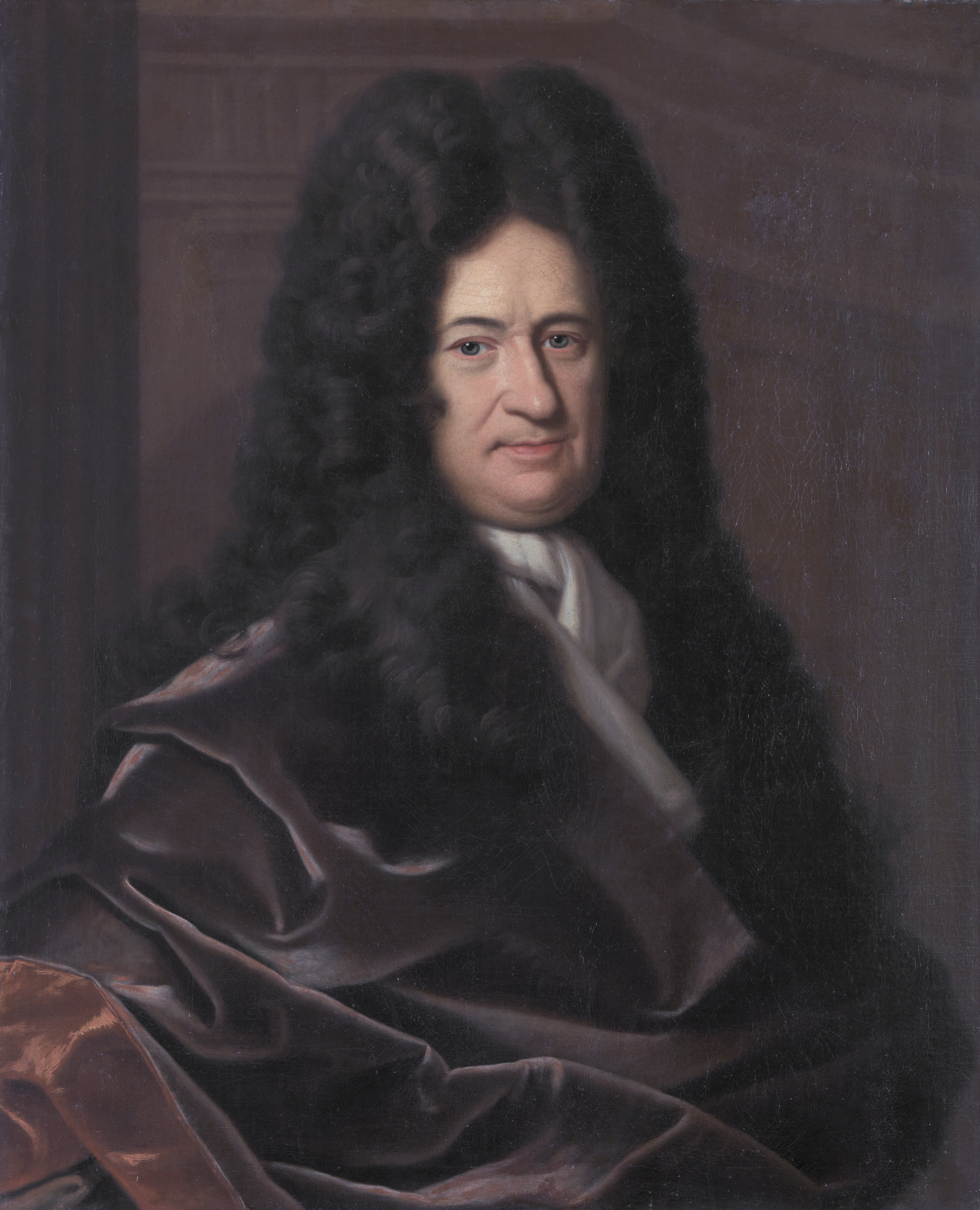
Gottfried Wilhelm Leibniz

- November 14 – Gottfried Leibniz, German philosopher, scientist, and mathematician (b. 1646)
- November 22 – Inaba Masamichi, Japanese daimyō (b. 1640)
- November 26 – Nils Bielke, member of the High Council of Sweden (b. 1644)
- November 29 – Ofspring Blackall, Bishop of Exeter (b. 1655)
- December 5 – William Ettrick, English politician (b. 1651)
- December 13 – Charles de La Fosse, French painter (b. 1640)
- December 14 – William Trumbull, English diplomat and politician (b. 1639)
- Stefano Erardi, Maltese painter (b. 1630)
- Lalla Aisha Mubarka, Empress of Morocco
- Samuel Weston, English politician

1717

- January 6 – Lambert Bos, Dutch scholar and critic (b. 1670)
- January 7 – Empress Xiaohuizhang, second consort of the Qing dynasty Shunzhi Emperor of China (b. 1641)
- January 13 – Maria Sibylla Merian, German-born Swiss naturalist and scientific illustrator, who studied plants and insects and made detailed paintings of them (b. 1647)
- January 30 – John Hartstonge, Irish bishop (b. 1654)

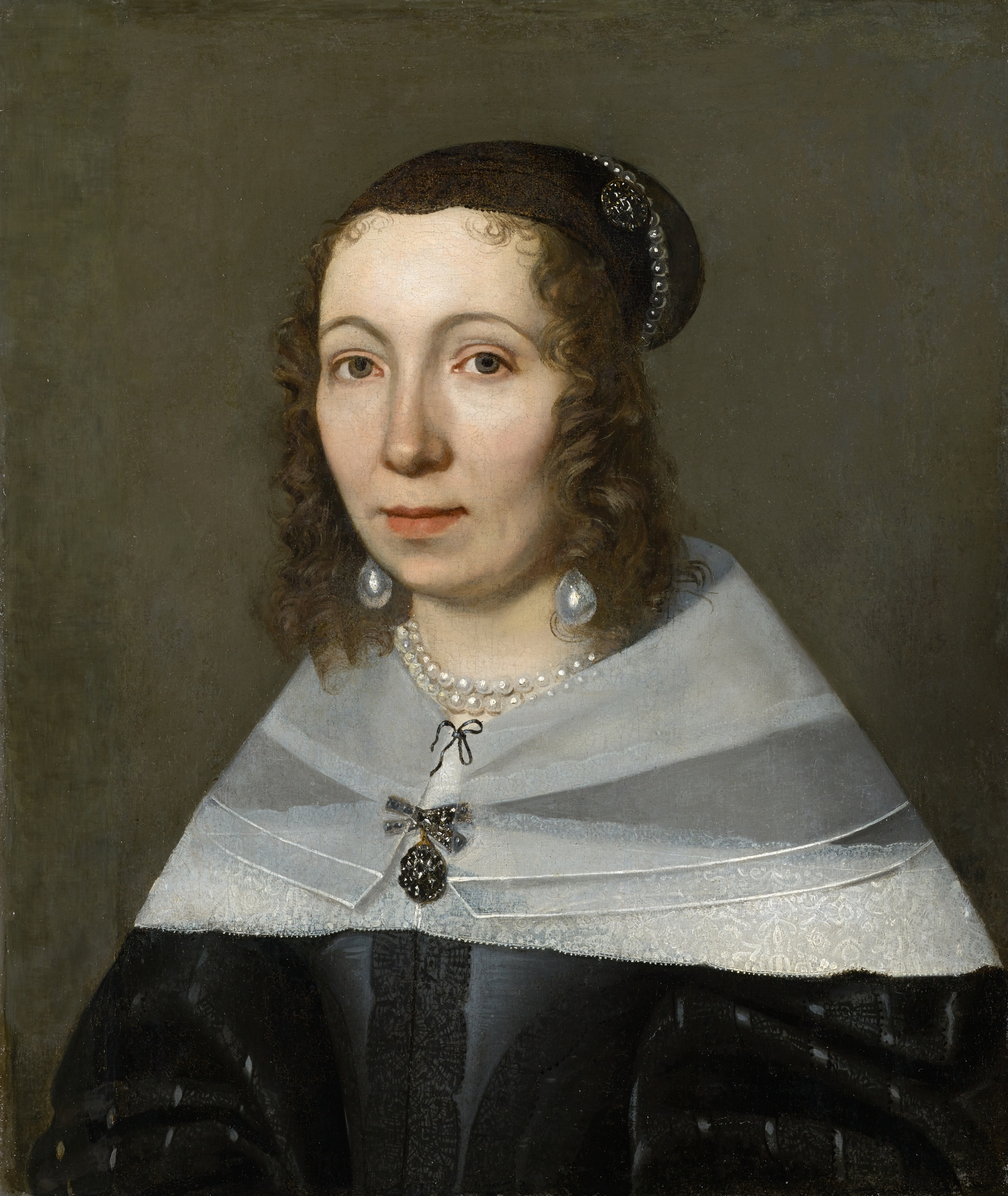
Maria Sibylla Merian

- February 18 – Giovanni Maria Morandi, Italian painter (b. 1622)
- February 21 – Jan Dobrogost Krasiński, Polish nobleman (szlachcic) (b. 1639)
- February 23 – Magnus Stenbock, Swedish military officer (b. 1664)
- March 3 – Pierre Allix, French Protestant clergyman (b. 1641)
- March 5 – François de Callières, French diplomat, member of the Académie française (b. 1645)
- March 8 – Abraham Darby I, English ironmaster, first of that name of three generations of a Quaker family that was key to the development of the Industrial Revolution (b. 1678)
- March 19 – John Campbell, 1st Earl of Breadalbane and Holland, Scottish royalist (b. 1636)
- April 3 – Jacques Ozanam, French mathematician (b. 1640)
- April 5 – Jean Jouvenet, French painter (b. 1647)
- April 11 – Abraham ben Saul Broda, Bohemian Talmudist (b. c. 1640)
- April 26
  - Samuel Bellamy (Black Sam), English-born pirate (b. 1689)
  - Christian II, Count Palatine of Zweibrücken-Birkenfeld (b. 1637)
  - John King, pirate (b. c. 1706/9)
- May 10 – John Hathorne, American magistrate (b. 1641)
- May 17 – Bon Boullogne, French painter (b. 1649)
- May 20 – John Trevor, Welsh lawyer and politician, Speaker of the House of Commons of England (b. 1637)
- June 3 – Fernando de Alencastre, 1st Duke of Linares, Spanish nobleman and military officer (b. c. 1641)

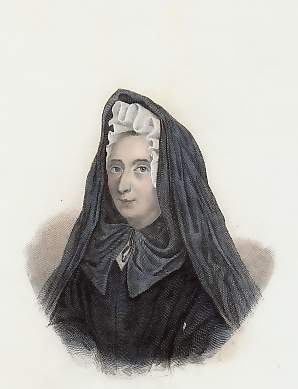
Jeanne Guyon

- June 9 – Jeanne Guyon, French mystic (b. 1648)
- June 11 – Louis de Carrières, French priest and Bible commentator (b. 1662)
- June 15 – Fabrizio Spada, Italian Catholic cardinal (b. 1643)
- June 23 – John Verney, 1st Viscount Fermanagh, British politician (b. 1640)
- July 1 – Princess Anna Sophie of Denmark, daughter of King Frederick III of Denmark (b. 1647)
- July 17 – Juan María de Salvatierra, Milanese Jesuit missionary to the Americas (b. 1648)
- August – William Cochrane, Scottish MP in the Parliament of Great Britain
- August 10 – Nicolaes Witsen, Mayor of Amsterdam, Netherlands (b. 1641)
- August 16 – William Blathwayt, English civil servant and politician (b. 1649)
- August 30 – William Lloyd, English bishop (b. 1627)
- September 17 – Robert Cotton, English politician (born 1644)
- October – Philippe Pastour de Costebelle, French naval officer and Governor of Newfoundland (b. 1661)
- October 22 – Henry Luttrell, Irish army officer, Jacobite commander (b. c. 1655; shot and mortally wounded in his sedan chair in Dublin)
- October 26 – Catherine Sedley, Countess of Dorchester, English mistress of James II of England (b. 1657)
- November 16 – Hester Davenport, English stage actress (b. 1642)
- November 21 – Jean-Baptiste Santerre, French painter (b. 1650)
- November 26 – Daniel Purcell, English composer (b. 1664)
- December 4 – William Hamilton, surgeon in the British East India Company
- December 5 – Richard Onslow, 1st Baron Onslow, English politician (b. 1654)
- December 13 – Nicholas Noyes, Massachusetts colonial minister, during the time of the Salem witch trials (b. 1647)
- December 25 – Robert Shirley, 1st Earl Ferrers, English peer and courtier (b. 1650)
- date unknown
  - William Diaper, English poet of the Augustan era (b. 1685)
  - William Boyd, 3rd Earl of Kilmarnock, Scottish nobleman
  - Niccolao Manucci, Italian writer and traveller in India (b. 1639)
  - Osei Kofi Tutu I, founder of the Ashanti Confederacy (b. c. 1660; killed in action)
  - Wang Hui, Chinese landscape painter (b. 1632)
  - Jane Wiseman, English actress, poet and playwright (b. c. 1682)

1718

- January 6
  - Giovanni Vincenzo Gravina, Italian writer and jurist (b. 1664)
  - Richard Hoare, English goldsmith and banker (b. 1648)
- January 7 – Empress Xiaohuizhang, Qing Dynasty empress and consort of the Shunzhi Emperor of China (b. 1641)
- January 17 – Captain Benjamin Church, Plymouth Colony settler and military officer (b. c. 1639)
- February 1 – Charles Talbot, 1st Duke of Shrewsbury, English politician (b. 1660)
- February 5 – Elizabeth Capell, Countess of Essex, British countess (b. 1636)
- February 17
  - Charlotte Lee, Countess of Lichfield, illegitimate daughter of King Charles II of England (b. 1664)
  - Prince George William of Great Britain, member of the British Royal Family (b. 1717)
- February 18 – Pierre Antoine Motteux, French-born English dramatist (b. 1663)
- March 9 – Marko Gerbec, Carniolan physician, scientist (b. 1658)
- March 13 – Friedrich Nicolaus Bruhns, German organist and composer (b. 1637)
- March 28 – Thomas Micklethwaite, Lord Commissioner of the Treasury (d. 1678)
- April 3 – Jacques Ozanam, French mathematician (b. 1640)
- April 18 – Michael Wening, German engraver (b. 1645)
- April 21 – Philippe de La Hire, French mathematician and astronomer (b. 1640)
- April 23 – Sir Edward Blackett, 2nd Baronet, English politician (b. 1649)

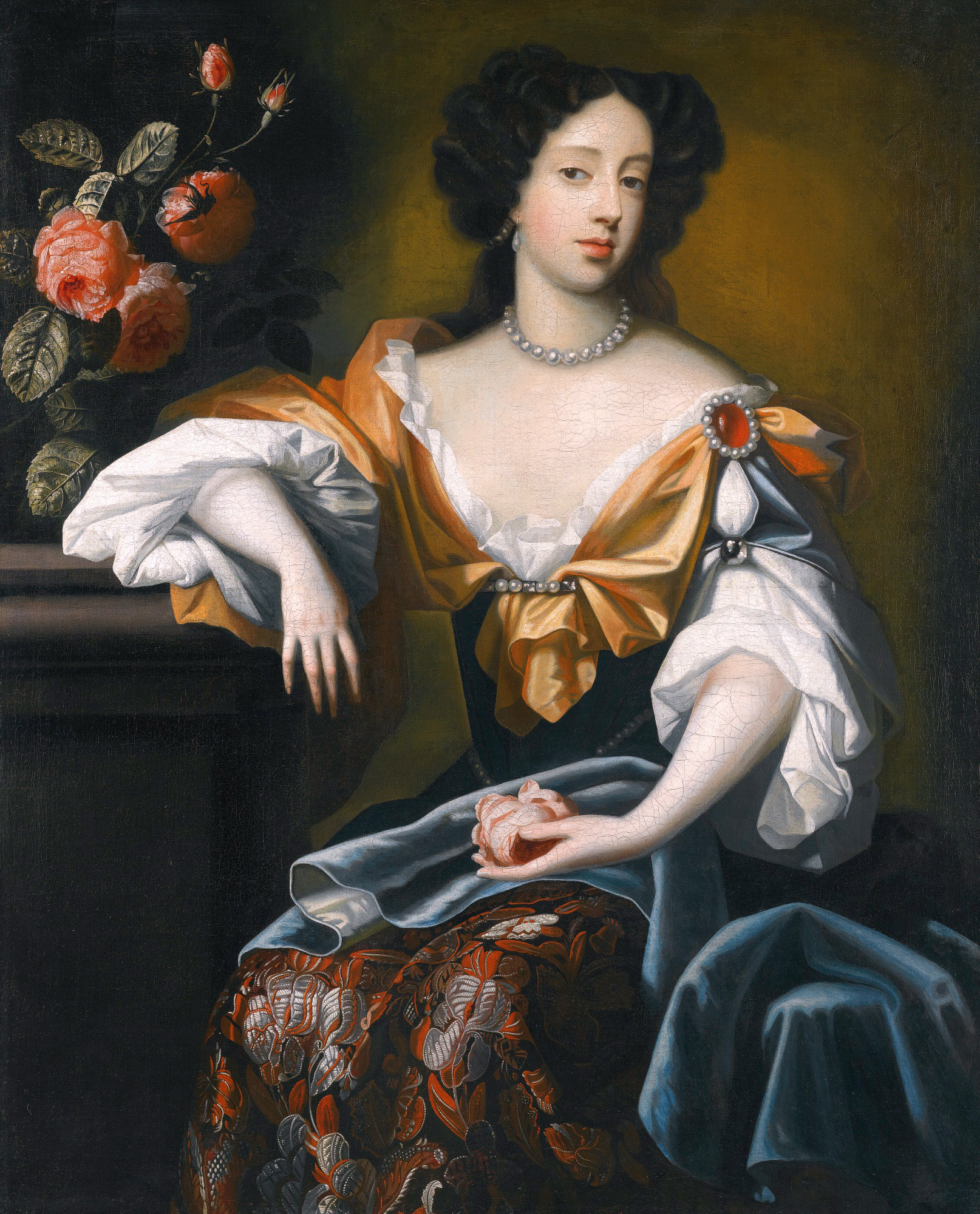
Mary of Modena

- May 7 – Mary of Modena, queen of James II of England (b. 1658)
- May 19 – Juan Andrés de Ustariz, Royal Governor of Cuba (b. 1656)
- May 16 – Jonas Danilssønn Ramus, Norwegian priest and historian (b. 1649)
- May 24 – Jeremiah Dummer, American silversmith (b. 1643)
- May 30
  - Arnold Joost van Keppel, 1st Earl of Albemarle, Dutch favorite of William III of England (b. 1670)
  - Bernard Nieuwentyt, Dutch mathematician and philosopher (b. 1654)
- June 9 – Jonathan Corwin, American judge of the Salem witch trials (b. 1640)
- June 13 – Louis, Count of Armagnac, French noble (b. 1641)
- June 17
  - Margherita Maria Farnese, Italian noblewoman (b. 1664)
  - James Tyrrell, English barrister and writer (b. 1642)
- July 21 – Shabbethai Bass, Polish Rabbi, author of Siftei Chachamim and founder of Jewish bibliography (b. 1641)
- July 28 – Étienne Baluze, French scholar (b. 1630)
- July 30 – William Penn, American settler, founder of Pennsylvania (b. 1644)
- August 2 – Al-Mahdi Muhammad, Yemeni imam (b. 1637)
- August 4 – René Lepage de Sainte-Claire, lord-founder of Rimouski in eastern Quebec, Canada (b. 1656)
- September 11 – Domenico Martinelli, Italian architect (b. 1650)
- September 12 – Louise de Maisonblanche, illegitimate daughter of Louis XIV of France (b. 1676)
- September 20 – George St Lo, Royal Navy officer and administrator (b. 1655)
- October 9 – Richard Cumberland, English philosopher (b. 1631)
- October 19 – Alphonse Henri, Count of Harcourt, French noble (b. 1648)
- November 3 – Karl, Prince of Anhalt-Zerbst (b. 1652)
- November 22
  - Blackbeard, English pirate (b. 1680)
  - Durgadas Rathore, Indian ruler (b. 1638)

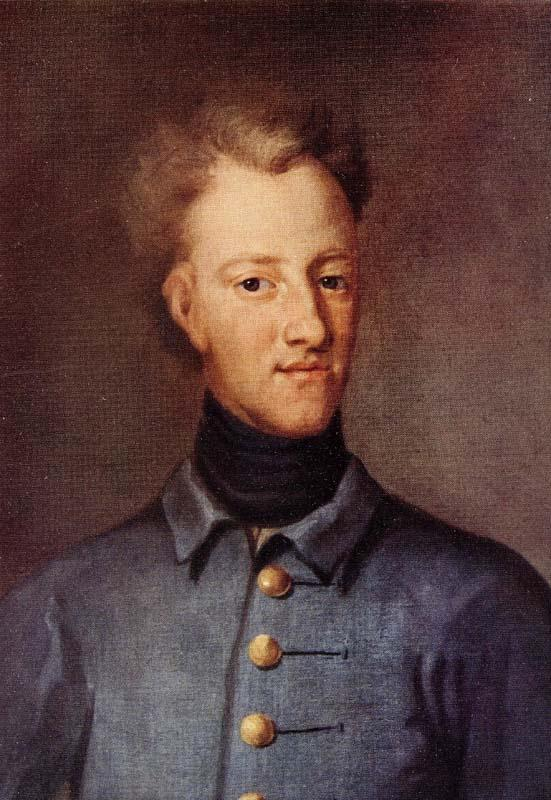
Charles XII of Sweden

- c. December – Black Caesar, African pirate (hanged)
- December 6 – Nicholas Rowe, English poet and dramatist (b. 1674)
- December 9 – Vincenzo Coronelli, Italian cartographer and encyclopedist (b. 1650)
- December 11 (November 30 Old Style) – King Charles XII of Sweden (b. 1682)
- December 10 – Stede Bonnet, Barbadian "gentleman pirate" (b. 1688)
- December 28 – Jan Brokoff, German sculptor (b. 1652)
- date unknown – Marie Grubbe, Danish countess (b. 1643)

1719

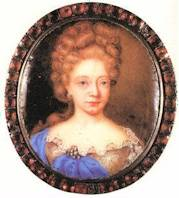
Sophie Amalie Moth died 17 January

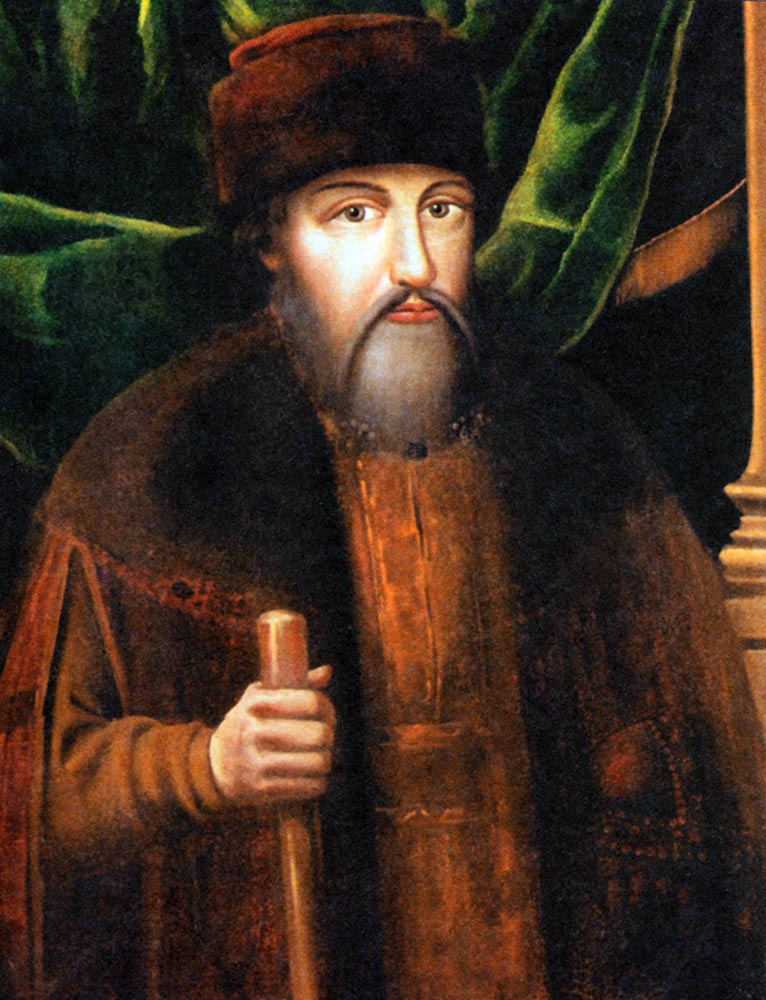
Tikhon Streshnev died 26 January

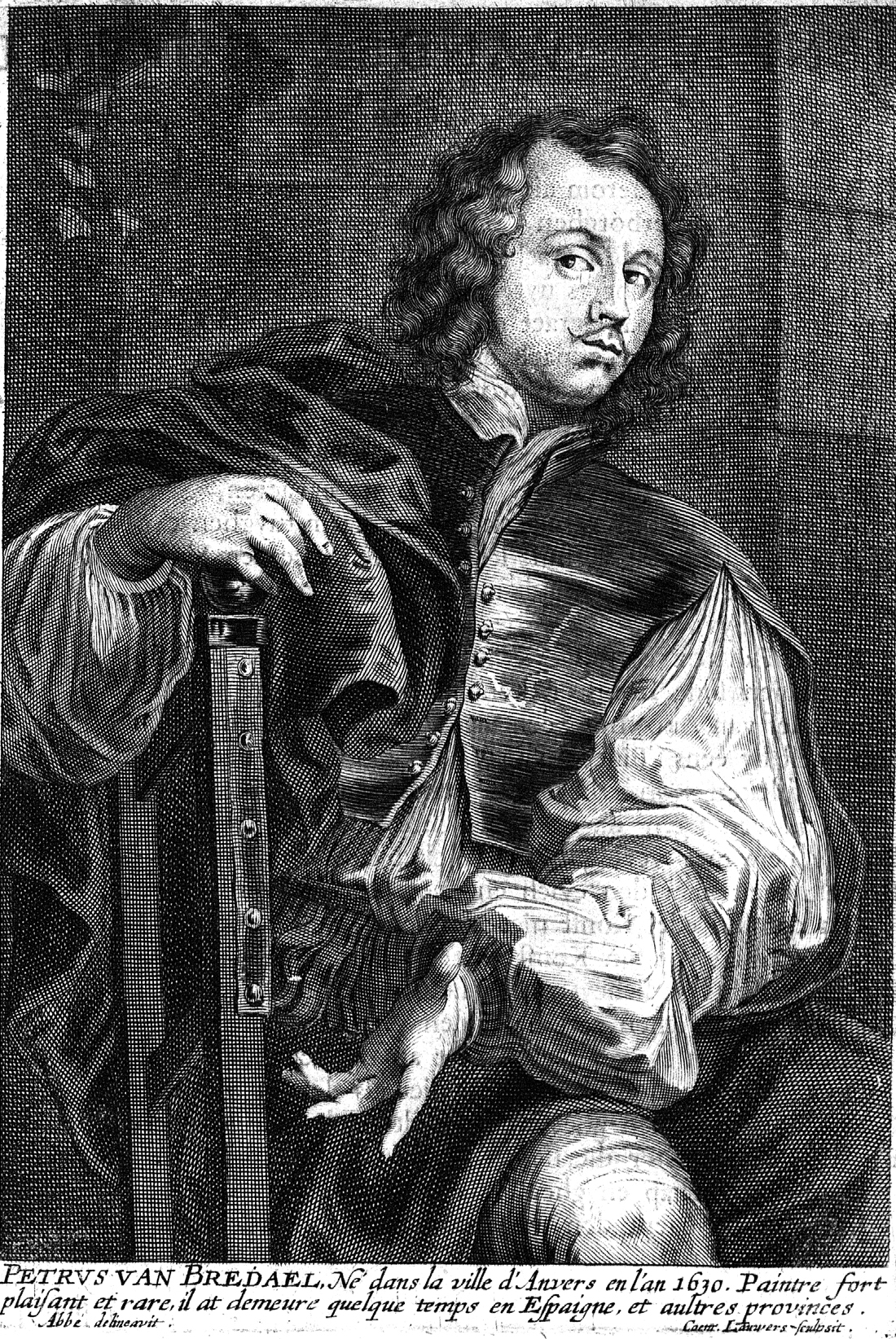
Peeter van Bredael died 9 March

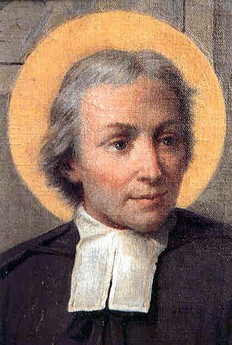
Jean-Baptiste de La Salle died 7 April

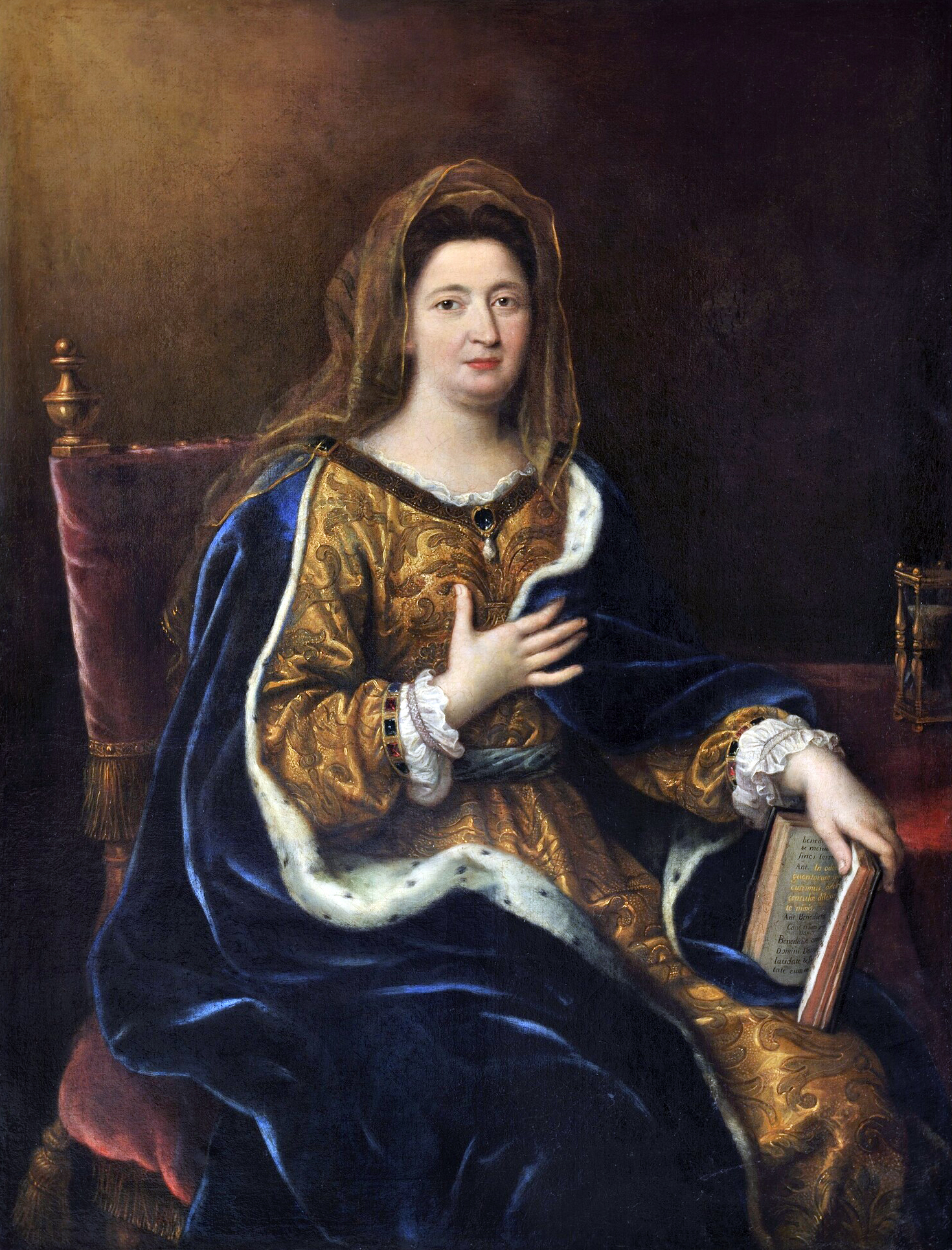
Françoise d'Aubigné died 15 April

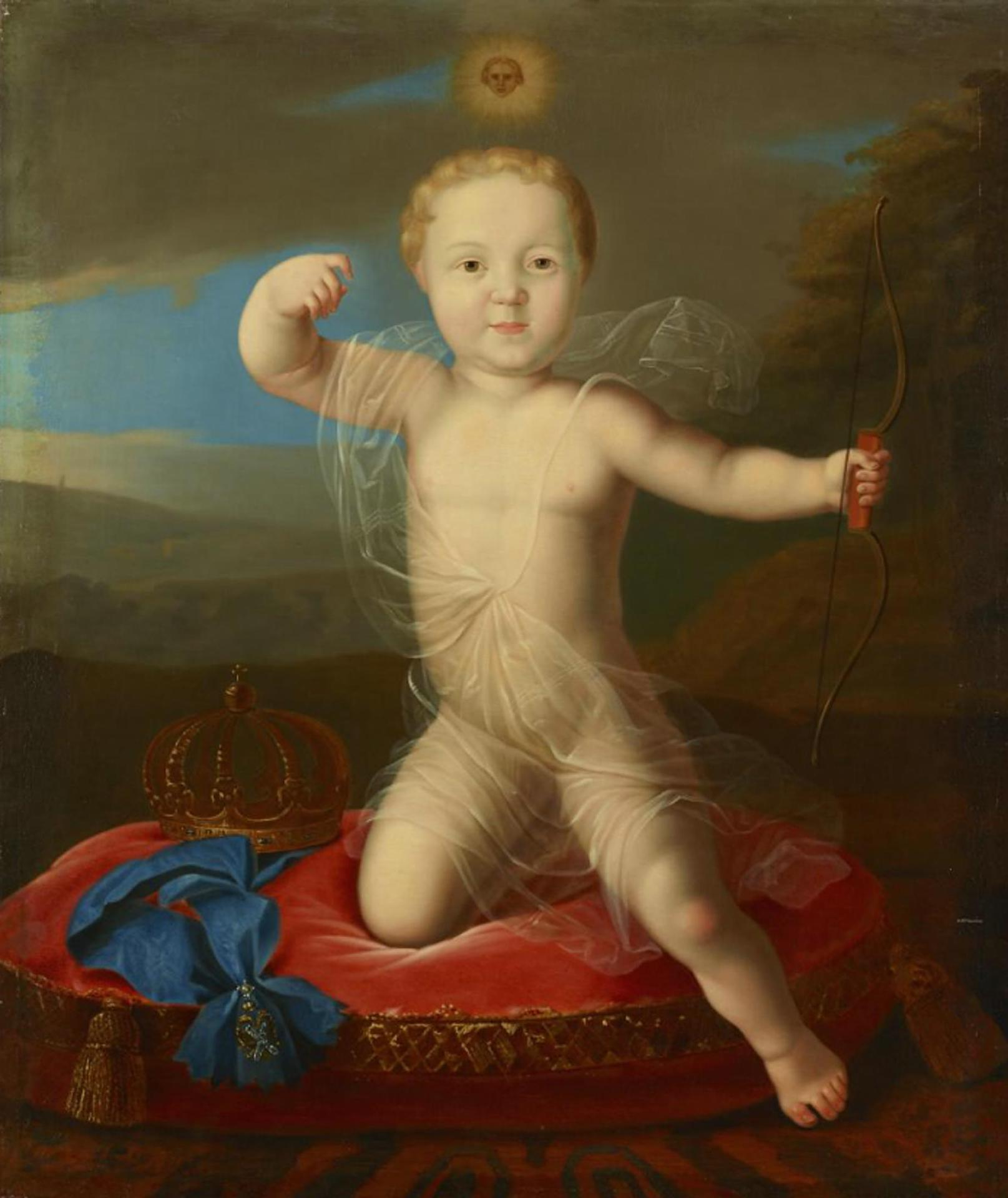
Peter Petrovich died 19 April

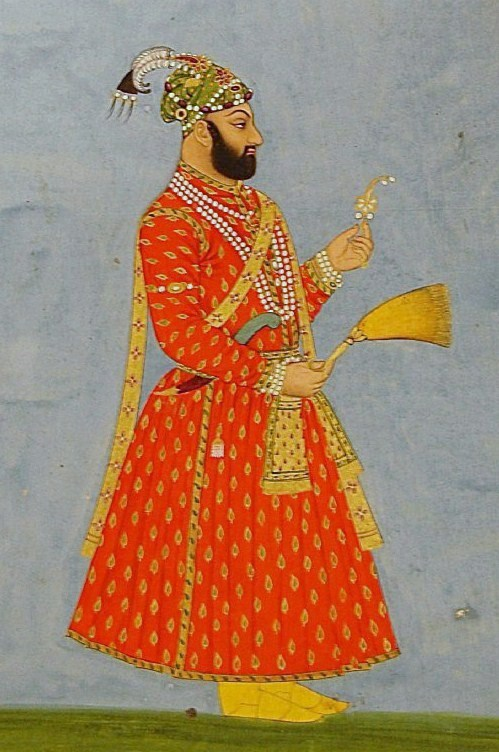
Farrukhsiyar died 28 April

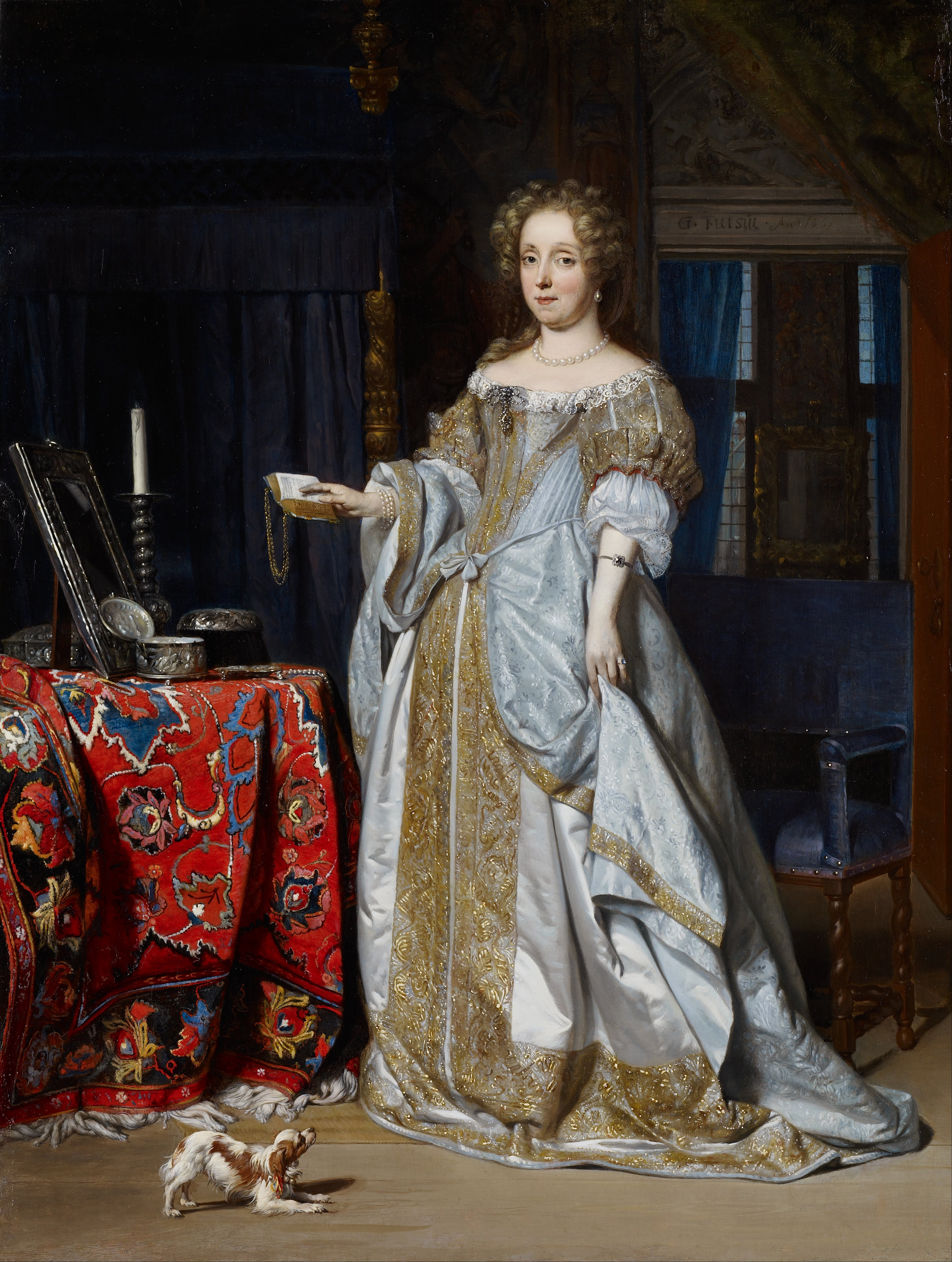
Lucia Wijbrants died 23 May

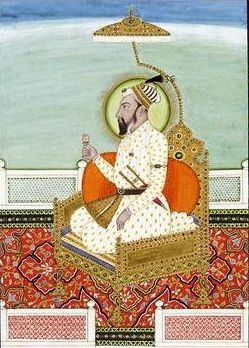
Rafi ud-Darajat died 6 June

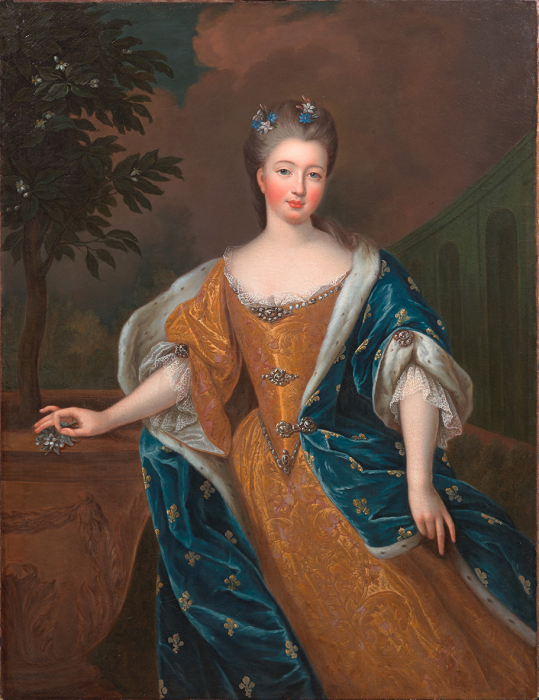
Marie Louise Élisabeth d'Orléans died 21 July

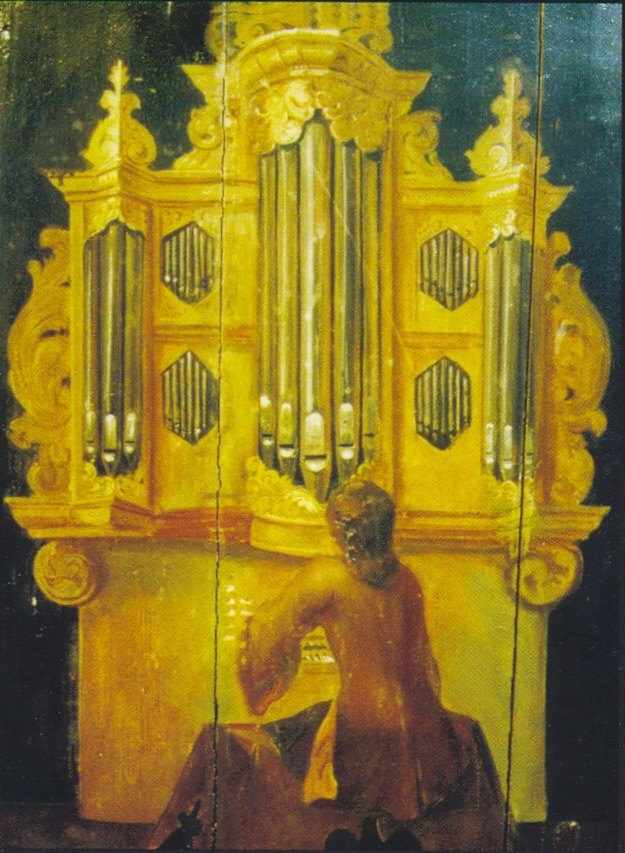
Arp Schnitger died 28 July

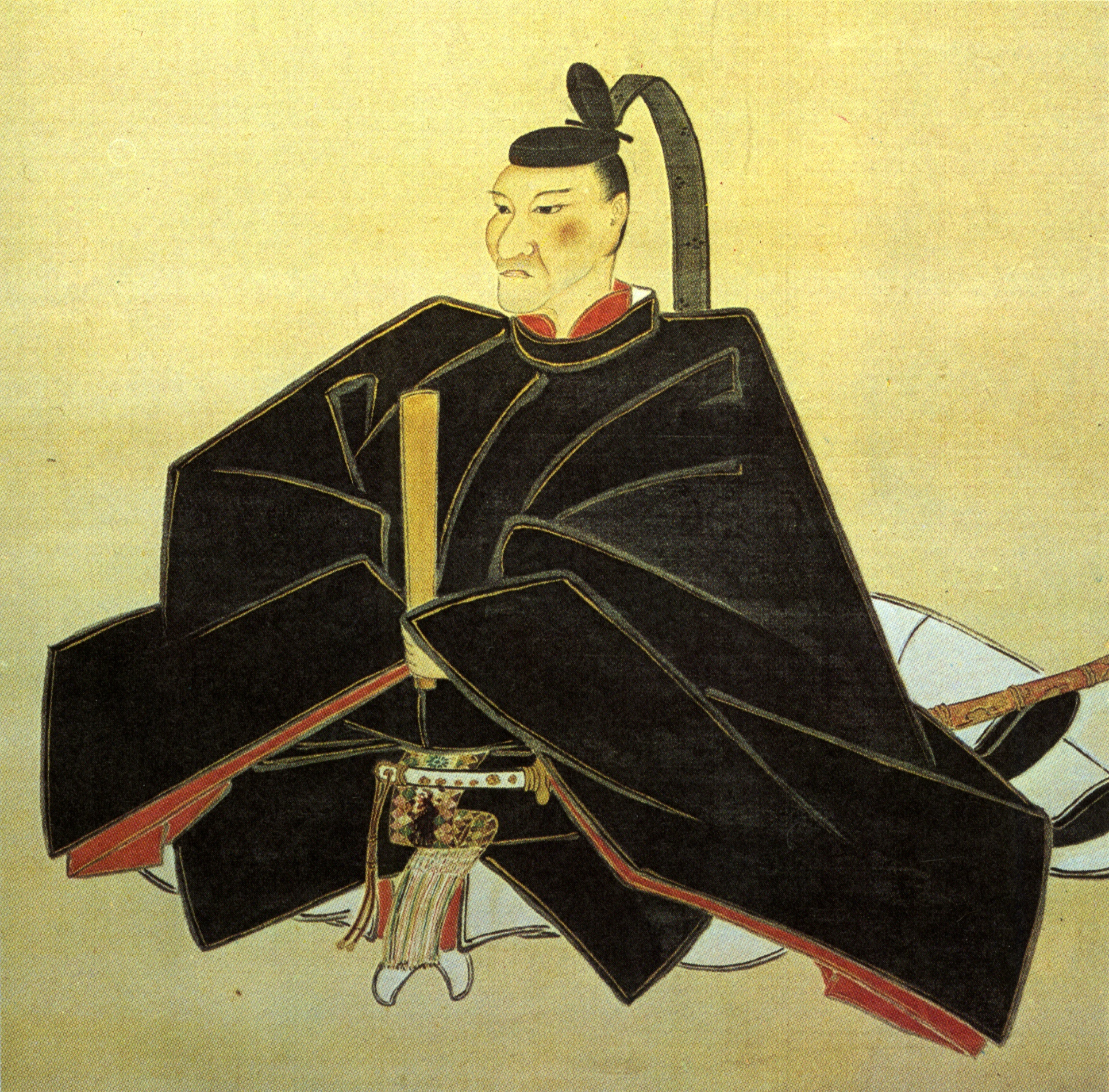
Date Tsunamura died 5 August

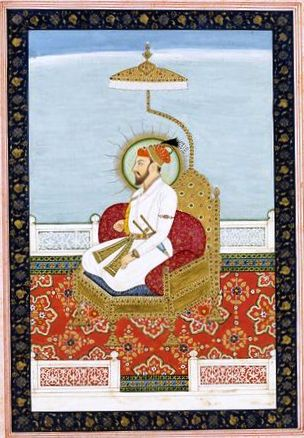
Shah Jahan II died 18 September

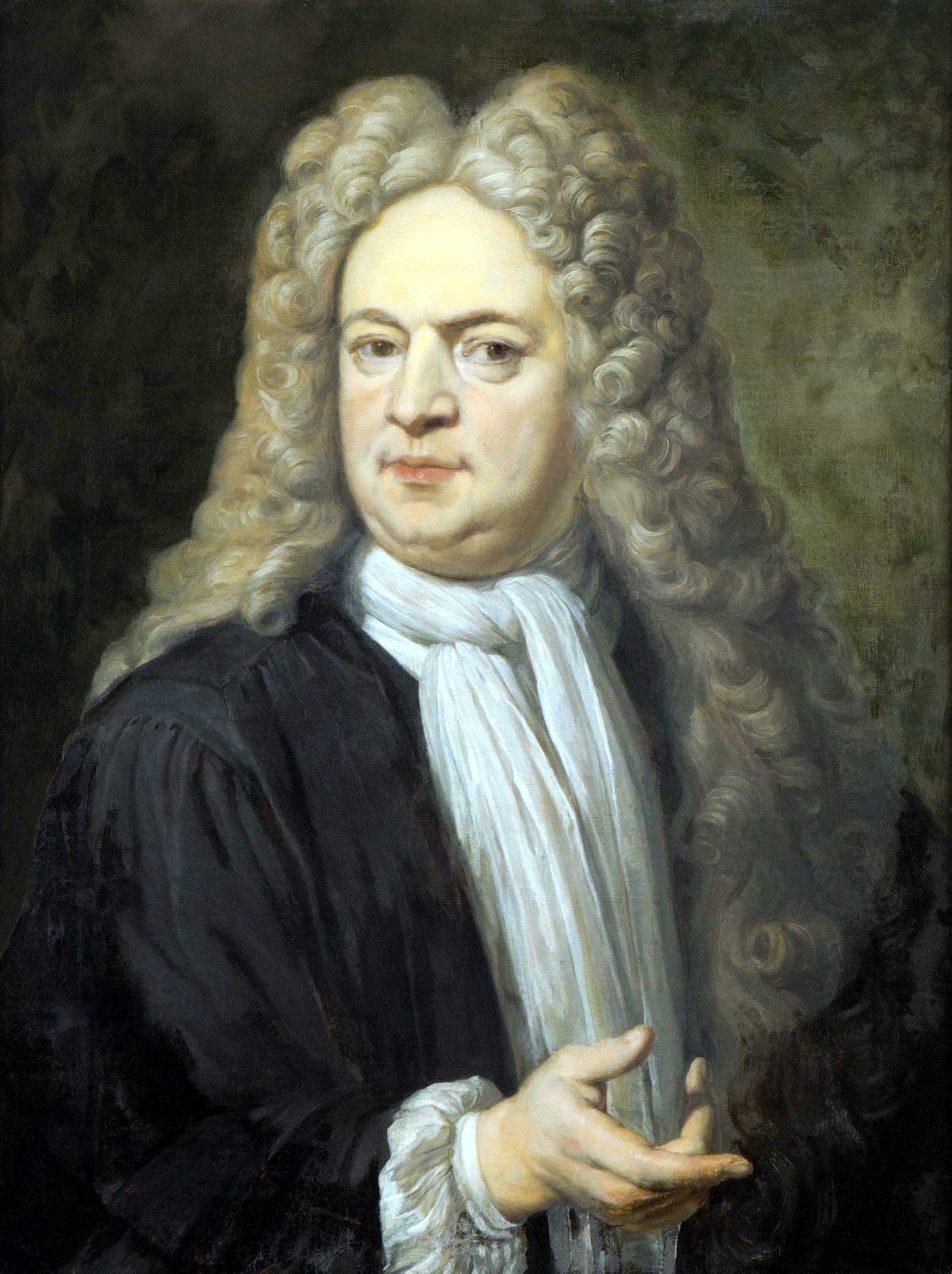
Johannes Jacobus Rau died 18 September

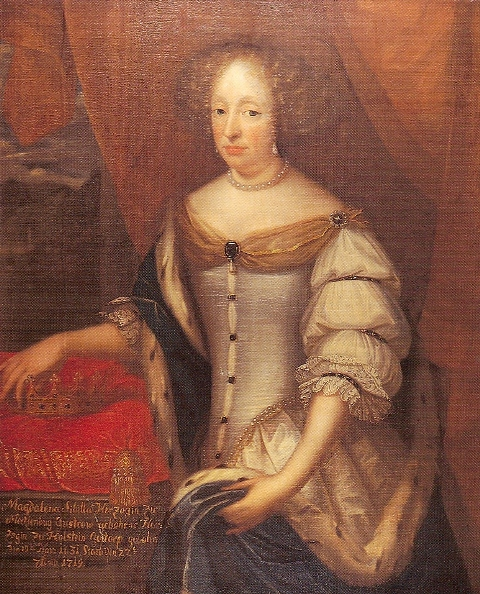
Magdalena Sibylla died 22 September

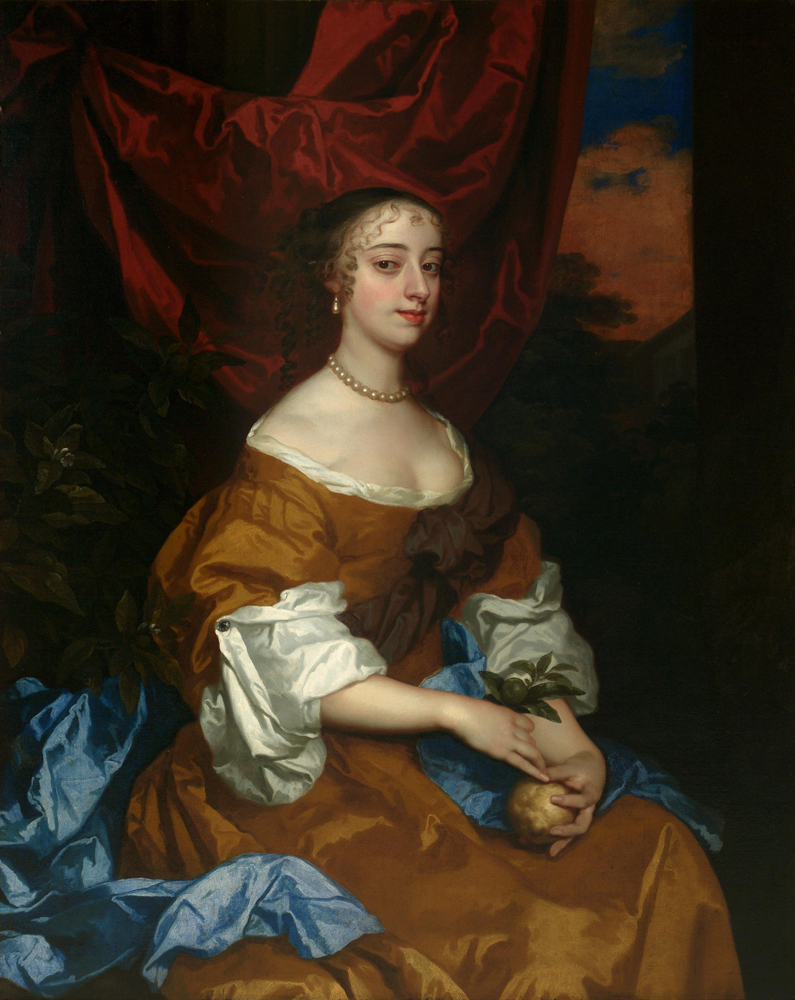
Margaret Hughes died 1 October

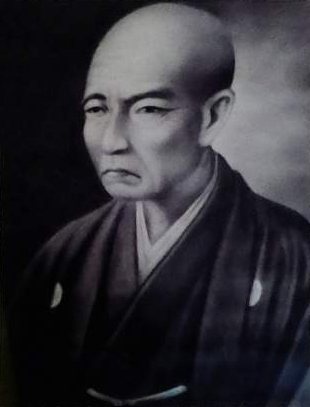
Yamamoto Tsunetomo died 30 November

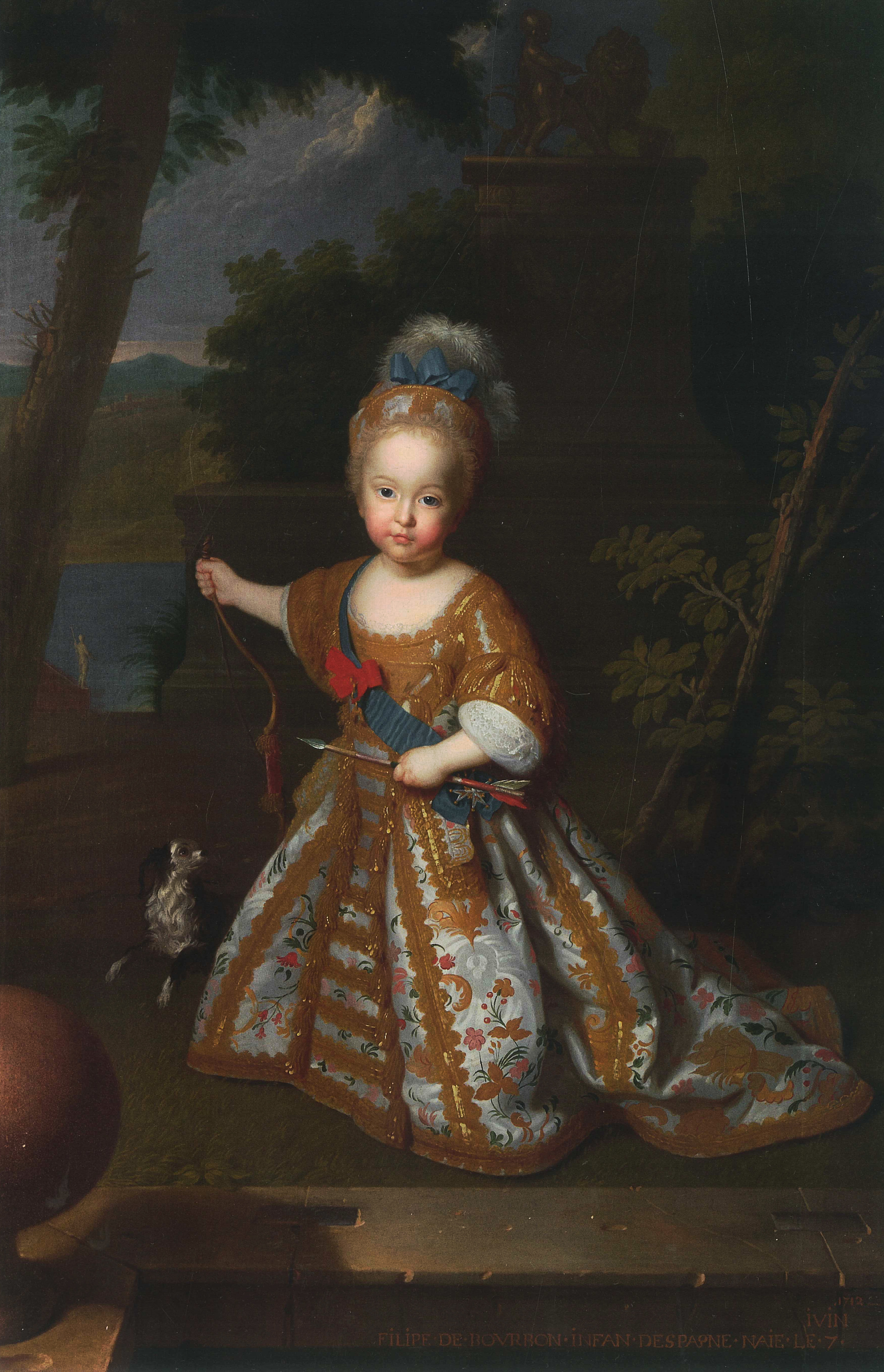
Philip of Spain died 29 December

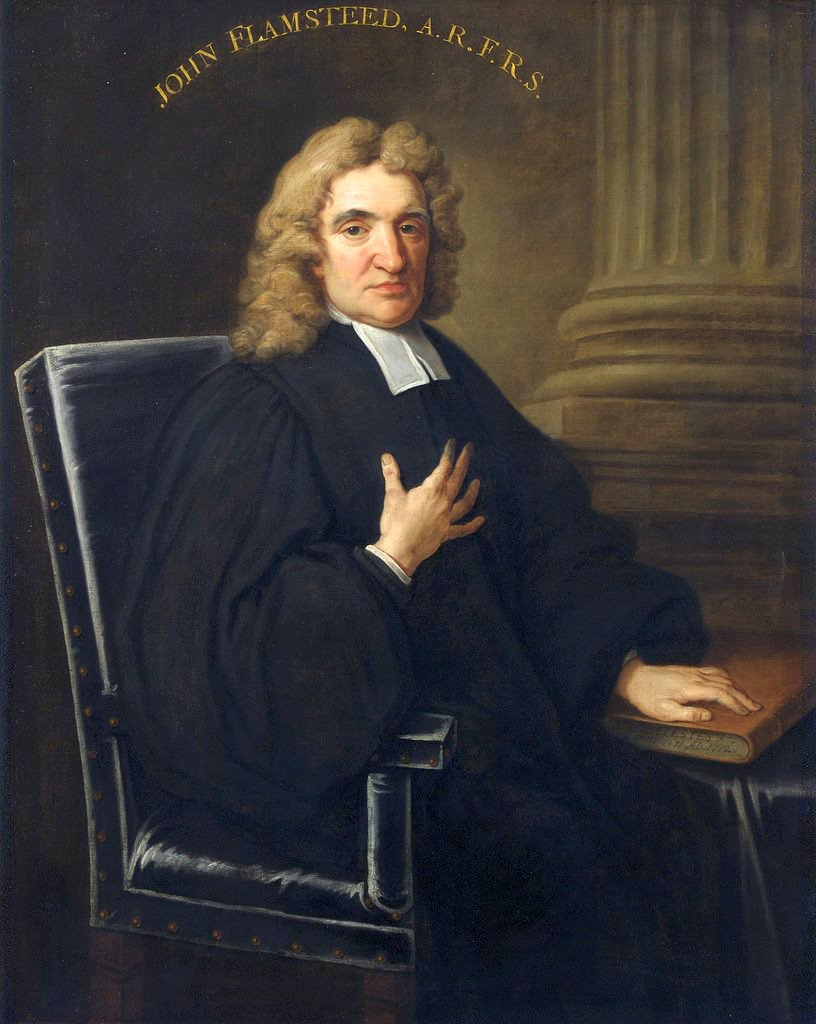
John Flamsteed died 31 December

- January 27 – William Munroe, Scottish soldier (b. 1625)
- January 3 – Jacob Toorenvliet, Dutch painter (b. 1640)
- January 5
  - Carlo Berlingeri, Roman Catholic Archbishop of Santa Severina (b. 1639)
  - Thomas Hay, 7th Earl of Kinnoull, Scottish peer and Conservative politician (b. 1660)
  - Philibert Vigier, French sculptor (b. 1636)
- January 6 – Richard Hoare, banker, founder of C. Hoare & Co. (b. 1648)
- January 11 – Mizoguchi Shigemoto, Japanese daimyō (b. 1680)
- January 16 – Petar Kanavelić, Venetian writer (b. 1637)
- January 17 – Sophie Amalie Moth, royal mistress of King Christian V of Denmark (b. 1654)
- January 18 – Samuel Garth, British writer (b. 1661)
- January 19 – Joachim Tielke, German musical instrument maker (b. 1641)
- January 22
  - William Paterson, Scottish trader and banker (b. 1658)
  - James Winstanley, English Member of Parliament (b. 1667)
- January 26 – Tikhon Streshnev, Russian noble (b. 1644)
- January 27 – Ferdinando d'Adda, Italian Catholic cardinal (b. 1650)
- February 6 – Köprülüzade Numan Pasha, Ottoman Grand Vizier (b. 1670)
- February 12 – Adam Ludwig Lewenhaupt, Swedish general (b. 1659)
- February 14 – Carl Philipp, Reichsgraf von Wylich und Lottum, Prussian field Marshal (b. 1650)
- February 15 – Bernardino Belluzzi, Roman Catholic prelate, Bishop of Camerino (b. 1642)
- February 19
  - Georg Heinrich von Görtz, German politician (b. 1668)
  - Ryer Jacobse Schermerhorn, merchant (b. 1652)
- February 22 – Pakubuwono I of Mataram, Sultan of Mataram (b. 1648)
- February 23 – Bartholomäus Ziegenbalg, German Lutheran clergy (b. 1682)
- February 25 – Giovanni Maria Casini, Italian composer (b. 1652)
- February 27 – Johann Ernst, Count of Nassau-Weilburg (b. 1664)
- February 28 – Boris Sheremetev, Russian noble (b. 1652)
- March 1 – Richard Ingoldesby, British Army officer, lieutenant governor of New York and New Jersey (b. 1617)
- March 3 – Jacques-Louis de Valon, French poet (b. 1659)
- March 7
  - Thomas Butler, 6th Viscount Ikerrin, Irish viscount (b. 1683)
  - Heinrich Bernhard Ruppius, German botanist (b. 1688)
  - Steven Jacobsz Vennekool, Dutch architect (b. 1660)
- March 9 – Peeter van Bredael, Flemish painter (b. 1629)
- March 10 – Jean-Baptiste Alexandre Le Blond, French architect (b. 1679)
- March 12 – Giuseppe Antonio Torricelli, Italian artist (b. 1659)
- March 13 – Johann Friedrich Böttger, Saxon alchemist (b. 1682)
- March 14 – Mary Hamilton, executed Russian lady-in-waiting (b. 1684)
- March 17 – Isaac de Larrey, French historian (b. 1638)
- March 19
  - Isaac Addington, functionary of the colonial government of Massachusetts (b. 1645)
  - Giambattista Spínola Jr., Roman Catholic cardinal (b. 1646)
- April 4 – Thomas Powys, English politician and judge; (b. 1649)
- April 5 – Edward Colston, politician (b. 1670)
- April 7 – Jean-Baptiste de La Salle, French priest, education reformer, saint in the Catholic Church (b. 1651)
- April 14 – Giovanni Tommaso Rovetta, Roman Catholic prelate, Bishop of Hvar (b. 1632)
- April 15 – Françoise d'Aubigné, Marquise de Maintenon, mistress and later secret wife of King Louis XIV of France (b. 1635)
- April 16 – Ketevan of Kakheti, princess (batonishvili) of eastern Georgia (b. 1648)
- April 19
  - Gabriel-Philippe de La Hire, French scientist (b. 1677)
  - Peter Petrovich, Russian Tsarevich, heir to the Russian throne from February 1718 to his death in 1719 (b. 1715)
- April 21
  - Sir Thomas Cave, 3rd Baronet, British politician (b. 1681)
  - Philippe de La Hire, French mathematician and astronomer (b. 1640)
- April 24 – Hyacinthe Robillard d'Avrigny, Jesuit (b. 1675)
- April 27 – Laurentius Christophori Hornæus, Swedish witch hunter (b. 1645)
- April 28 – Farrukhsiyar, Mughal Emperor (b. 1685)
- May 3 – Pierre Le Gros the Younger, sculptor from France (b. 1666)
- May 5 – Prince Yeollyeong, Korean prince (b. 1699)
- May 7 – Sebastiano Bombelli, Italian painter (b. 1635)
- May 13
  - Richard Dyott, English politician; (b. 1667)
  - John Lenton, English composer, violinist, and singer (b. 1657)
- May 21 – Pierre Poiret, French philosopher and mystic (b. 1646)
- May 23
  - Gerhard Treschow, Norwegian businessman (b. 1659)
  - Lucia Wijbrants, Dutch artist (b. 1638)
- May 27 – Thomas Newport, 1st Baron Torrington, British politician and baron (b. 1655)
- May 29
  - Joseph de Jouvancy, French historian (b. 1643)
  - Sir Alexander Seton, 1st Baronet, Scottish baronet (b. 1639)
  - Abraham Trommius, Dutch theologian (b. 1633)
- May 31 – Edmund Dunch, English politician (b. 1657)
- June 2 – Charles Le Goux de La Berchère, French prelate (b. 1647)
- June 5 – Jean-Baptiste Delaveyne, French monk, priest and religious founder (b. 1653)
- June 6
  - Louis Ellies Dupin, French historian and theologian (b. 1657)
  - Rafi ud-Darajat, 10th Mughal Emperor (b. 1699)
- June 7 – John Addenbrooke, English doctor and benefactor (b. 1680)
- June 17
  - Fitzherbert Adams, Academic administrator, clergyman, and benefactor (b. 1651)
  - Joseph Addison, English essayist, poet, playwright and politician (b. 1672)
- June 19
  - Howell Davis, Welsh pirate (b. 1690)
  - Thomas Meredyth, Irish soldier and politician (b. 1660)
- June 20 – Willem Kerricx, Flemish sculptor (b. 1652)
- June 21
  - Jules Louis Bolé, marquis de Chamlay, French diplomat (b. 1650)
  - Domingo de Valencia, Roman Catholic prelate, Bishop of Nueva Caceres (b. 1647)
- June 23 – Christopher Wandesford, 2nd Viscount Castlecomer, Member of Parliament (b. 1684)
- June 26 – Frederick William I, Duke of Schleswig-Holstein-Sonderburg-Beck (b. 1682)
- July 5 – Samuel Schotten, German rabbi (b. 1644)
- July 16
  - James Keill, Scottish physician, philosopher, medical writer and translator (b. 1673)
  - Johann Ulrich Kraus, Illustrator, engraver and publisher (b. 1655)
  - Meinhardt Schomberg, 3rd Duke of Schomberg, English general (b. 1641)
- July 17 – Elinor James, British pamphleteer (b. 1644)
- July 19 – Anna Katharina Block, German Baroque (b. 1642)
- July 21
  - Robert Clicquot, French pipeorgan builder (b. 1645)
  - Marie Louise Élisabeth d'Orléans, French princess (b. 1695)
- July 22
  - Heneage Finch, 1st Earl of Aylesford, English lawyer and politician (b. 1649)
  - Giovanni Gioseffo dal Sole, Italian painter and engraver (b. 1654)
- July 27 – Cornelis de Graeff II., Lords of Purmerland and Ilpendam (b. 1671)
- July 28 – Arp Schnitger, German organ builder (b. 1648)
- July 30 – Giambattista Felice Zappi, poet from Italy (b. 1667)
- August 2 – Karol Stanisław Radziwiłł, Polish prince (b. 1669)
- August 3 – Johann Philipp von Greifenclau zu Vollraths, Prince-Bishop of Wurzburg (b. 1652)
- August 5 – Date Tsunamura, Japanese daimyō at the center of the Date Sōdō (b. 1659)
- August 7 – Richard Farington, English politician (b. 1644)
- August 8 – Christoph Ludwig Agricola, German painter (b. 1667)
- August 9 – Charles Middleton, 2nd Earl of Middleton, English and Scottish politician (b. 1649)
- August 11 – Leonard Goffiné, German Catholic priest and writer (b. 1648)
- August 14 – Alexander Grant, Scottish army officer (b. 1674)
- August 18 – Heinrich von Cocceji, German scholar (b. 1644)
- August 19 – Carl Hildebrand von Canstein, German theologian, jurist and writer (b. 1667)
- August 30 – Daniel Cronström, Swedish architect (b. 1655)
- September 7 – John Harris, English writer, scientist, Anglican priest (b. 1666)
- September 8 – Carlo Cignani, Italian painter (b. 1628)
- September 16 – Henrich Danckwardt, Swedish military personnel (b. 1670)
- September 18
  - Shah Jahan II, Mughal emperor (b. 1696)
  - Johannes Jacobus Rau, German physician (b. 1668)
- September 19
  - Frans Anneessens, leader of a Brussels guild, decapitated for involvement in uprisings (b. 1660)
  - Jan Weenix, Dutch painter (b. 1642)
- September 21 – Johann Heinrich Acker, German historian (b. 1647)
- September 22
  - Magdalena Sibylla of Holstein-Gottorp, Duchess of Holstein-Gottorp (b. 1631)
  - Hans Schack, 2nd Count of Schackenborg, Danish nobleman (b. 1676)
- September 25 – Michel Félibien, French historian and writer (b. 1665)
- September 27 – George Smalridge, English Bishop of Bristol (b. 1662)
- September 29 – Jean Orry, French economist (b. 1652)
- October 1 – Margaret Hughes, British actress (b. 1630)
- October 3 – Johann Gregor Thalnitscher, Carniolan lawyer, scholar of ancient inscriptions, chronicler, historian (b. 1655)
- October 7 – Pierre Remond de Montmort, French mathematician (b. 1678)
- October 9 – Charles Louis Bretagne de La Trémoille, French noble (b. 1683)
- October 11
  - Samuel Jones, English Dissenter and tutor (b. 1681)
  - Fernando Manuel de Bustillo Bustamante y Rueda, Spanish Field Marshal (b. 1663)
- October 14 – Arnold Houbraken, painter from the Northern Netherlands (b. 1660)
- October 15 – Jan Mortel, painter from the Northern Netherlands (b. 1652)
- October 25 – Catharina Wallenstedt, Swedish writer and courtier (b. 1627)
- October 26 – Laurens van der Meulen, Flemish sculptor (b. 1643)
- October 27 – François Baert, Belgian hagiographer (b. 1651)
- October 28
  - Jean Baptiste Bissot, Sieur de Vincennes, French-Canadian explorer and soldier (b. 1668)
  - Martinus Nellius, Dutch Golden Age painter (b. 1621)
- November 2 – Georg Johann Mattarnovi, German architect (b. 1677)
- November 3 – Jan Claesz Rietschoof, Dutch Golden Age painter (b. 1652)
- November 8 – Michel Rolle, French mathematician (b. 1652)
- November 9 – Oley Douglas, British Member of Parliament (b. 1684)
- November 19 – Charles-Claude Genest, French dramatist and playwright (b. 1639)
- November 22 – William Talman, British architect; (b. 1650)
- November 23 – John Mavrocordatos, Phanariote Prince (b. 1684)
- November 26 – John Hudson, English classical scholar (b. 1662)
- November 30 – Yamamoto Tsunetomo, Japanese samurai (b. 1659)
- December 2 – Pasquier Quesnel, French Jansenist theologian (b. 1634)
- December 3 – Adriaen Frans Boudewijns, Flemish painter and engraver (b. 1644)
- December 8 – Ulrik Christian Gyldenløve, Count of Samsø, Danish nobleman and admiral (b. 1678)
- December 9 – Charles Oliphant, British physician (b. 1666)
- December 11
  - Chatan Chōai, sessei of Ryukyu (b. 1650)
  - Stefano Cupilli, Roman Catholic Archbishop of Split (b. 1659)
- December 15 – Mitford Crowe, English politician (b. 1669)
- December 24 – William O'Brien, 3rd Earl of Inchiquin, Irish Earl (b. 1662)
- December 28 – Jacob Bobart the Younger, English botanist (b. 1641)
- December 29 – Philip of Spain, Spanish Royal infante (b. 1712)
- December 30 – Lord James Murray, British politician (b. 1663)
- December 31 – John Flamsteed, English astronomer and the first Astronomer Royal (b. 1646)
- date unknown
  - Robert Clicquot, French organ builder (b. 1645)
  - Benjamin Hornigold, English pirate (b. 1680)
  - André Raison, French composer and organist (b. 1650)
  - Adam Ludwig Lewenhaupt, Swedish general (b. 1659)
