= 1713 =

1713 in various calendars
- Gregorian calendar: 1713; MDCCXIII
- Ab urbe condita: 2466
- Armenian calendar: 1162; ԹՎ ՌՃԿԲ
- Assyrian calendar: 6463
- Balinese saka calendar: 1634–1635
- Bengali calendar: 1119–1120
- Berber calendar: 2663
- British Regnal year: 11 Ann. 1 – 12 Ann. 1
- Buddhist calendar: 2257
- Burmese calendar: 1075
- Byzantine calendar: 7221–7222
- Chinese calendar: 壬辰年 (Water Dragon); 4410 or 4203 — to — 癸巳年 (Water Snake); 4411 or 4204
- Coptic calendar: 1429–1430
- Discordian calendar: 2879
- Ethiopian calendar: 1705–1706
- Hebrew calendar: 5473–5474
- Hindu calendars
- Vikram Samvat: 1769–1770
- Shaka Samvat: 1634–1635
- Kali Yuga: 4813–4814
- Holocene calendar: 11713
- Igbo calendar: 713–714
- Iranian calendar: 1091–1092
- Islamic calendar: 1124–1125
- Japanese calendar: Shōtoku 3 (正徳３年)
- Javanese calendar: 1636–1637
- Julian calendar: Gregorian minus 11 days
- Korean calendar: 4046
- Minguo calendar: 199 before ROC 民前199年
- Nanakshahi calendar: 245
- Thai solar calendar: 2255–2256
- Tibetan calendar: ཆུ་ཕོ་འབྲུག་ལོ་ (male Water-Dragon); 1839 or 1458 or 686 — to — ཆུ་མོ་སྦྲུལ་ལོ་ (female Water-Snake); 1840 or 1459 or 687

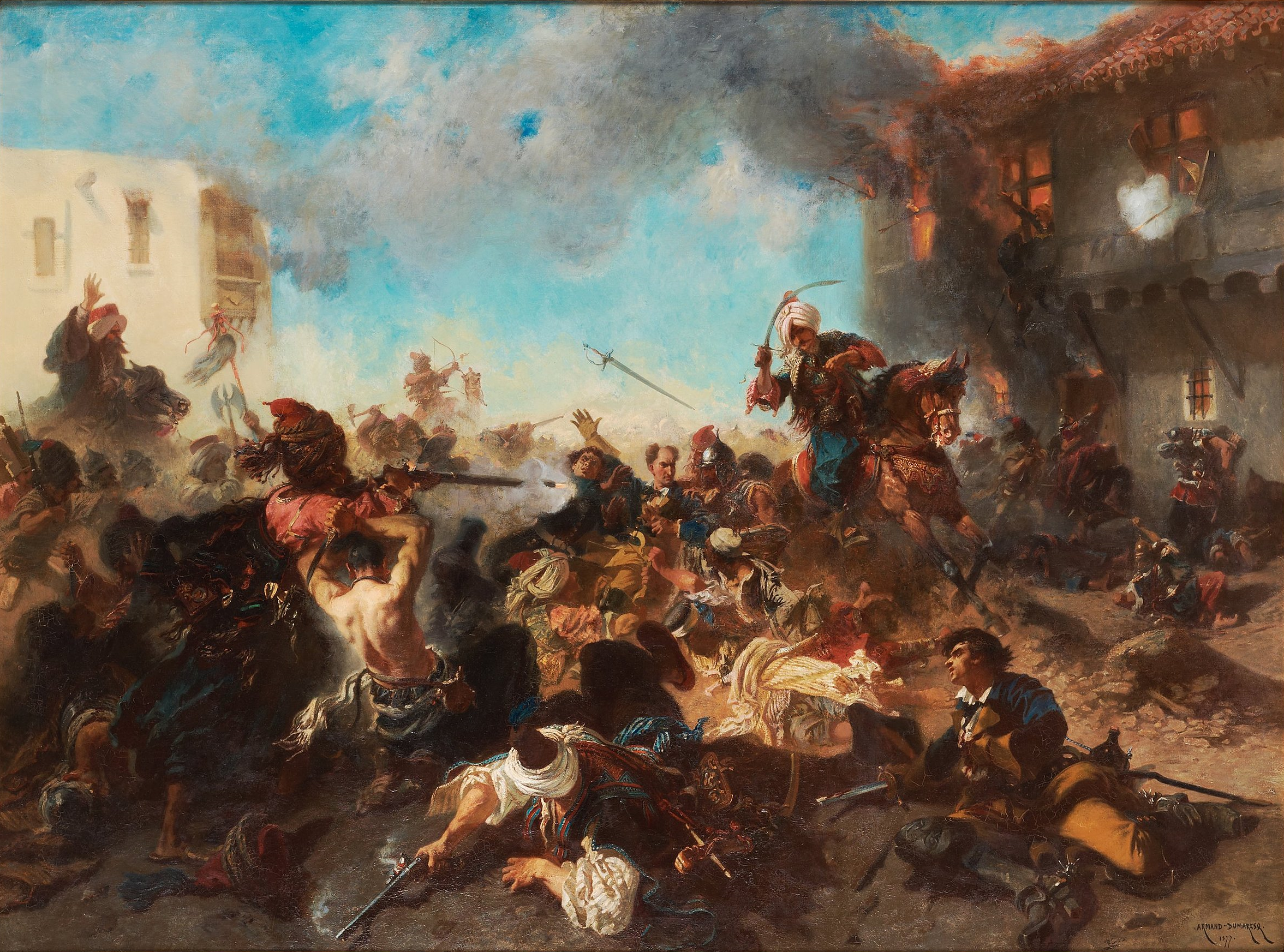
February 1: King Charles XII of Sweden defeated by the Ottomans.

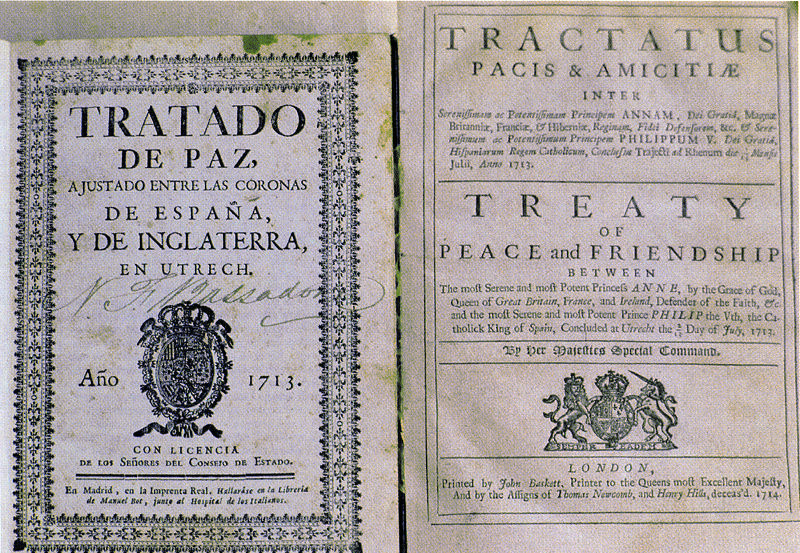
Treaty of Utrecht

1713 (MDCCXIII) was a common year starting on Sunday of the Gregorian calendar and a common year starting on Thursday of the Julian calendar, the 1713th year of the Common Era (CE) and Anno Domini (AD) designations, the 713th year of the 2nd millennium, the 13th year of the 18th century, and the 4th year of the 1710s decade. As of the start of 1713, the Gregorian calendar was 11 days ahead of the Julian calendar, which remained in localized use until 1923.

== Events ==
=== January–March ===
- January 17 – Tuscarora War: Colonel James Moore leads the Carolina militia out of Albemarle County, North Carolina, in a second offensive against the Tuscarora. Heavy snows force the troops to take refuge in Fort Reading, on the Pamlico River.
- February 1 – Skirmish at Bender, Moldova: Charles XII of Sweden is defeated by the Ottoman Empire.
- February 4 – Tuscarora War: The Carolina militia under Colonel James Moore leaves Fort Reading, to continue the campaign against the Tuscarora.
- February 25 – Frederick William I of Prussia begins his reign.
- March 1 – Tuscarora War: Colonel James Moore's Carolina militia lays siege to the Tuscaroran stronghold of Fort Neoheroka, located a few miles up Contentnea Creek from Fort Hancock.
- March 20 – Tuscarora War: Colonel James Moore's Carolina militia launches a major offensive against Fort Neoheroka.
- March 23 – Tuscarora War: Fort Neoheroka falls to the Carolina militia, effectively ending the Tuscarora nation's military strength. Two Tuscaroran allies, the Machapunga and Coree tribes, continue offensive actions against North Carolina.
- March 27 – First Treaty of Utrecht between Great Britain and Spain: Philip V is accepted by Britain and Austria as king of Spain; Spain cedes Gibraltar and Menorca to Britain.

=== April–June ===
- April 11 – The Second Treaty of Utrecht between Great Britain and France ends the War of the Spanish Succession. France cedes Newfoundland, Acadia, Hudson Bay and St Kitts to Great Britain.
- April 14 – First performance, in London, of Joseph Addison's libertarian play Cato, a Tragedy, which will be influential on both sides of the Atlantic.
- April 19 – With no living male heirs, Charles VI, Holy Roman Emperor, issues the Pragmatic Sanction of 1713, to ensure one of his daughters will inherit the Habsburg lands.
- May 1 – As part of the Treaty of Utrecht, the Spanish Crown agrees the Asiento de Negros with Anne, Queen of Great Britain, granting a subsidiary of the British South Sea Company, the Real Asiento de Inglaterra, a 30-year monopoly in the supply of African slaves to colonial Spanish America.
- May 2 – In the Great Northern War, a fleet of the Russian Navy, transporting 12,000 soldiers, sails from Kronstadt to attack the Swedish Army at Helsinki.
- May 6 – The Parliament of Ireland is dissolved by Queen Anne and new elections are set.
- May 13 – King Philip V of Spain issues an auto accordado that changes the order of succession for the Spanish throne allowing a female descendant within the House of Bourbon to rule. The change will allow his great-great-granddaughter to ascend the throne in 1833 as Queen Isabella II.
- May 17 – Ottone in villa, the first opera by composer Antonio Vivaldi, is given its initial performance, debuting at the Teatro delle Grazie in Vicenza
- May 21 – Great Northern War: The Russian fleet lands a force of 10,000 men at Pernå on the southern coast of Finland.
- June 1 (approx.) – Tuscarora War: Colonel James Moore leads the Carolina militia into the Pamlico Peninsula to defeat the Machapunga and Coree tribes.
- June 23 – French residents of Acadia are given one year to declare allegiance to Great Britain, or leave Nova Scotia.

=== July–September ===
- July 9 – The Junta de Braços (parliament) of the Principality of Catalonia votes in favour of staying in the War of the Spanish Succession against Philip V of Spain. Army of Catalonia raised.
- July 13 – The Treaty of Portsmouth brings an end to Queen Anne's War.
- August 8 – The Parliament of Great Britain, third since the Act of Union, is dissolved
- August 22 – Voting begins in the 1713 British general election in various constituencies and continues to November 12
- September 1 – Tuscarora War: The Carolina militia, led by Colonel James Moore, returns to South Carolina, after mixed success in the campaign against the Machapunga and Coree tribes.

=== October–December ===
- October 6 – The Treaty of Schwedt is signed between Russia and Brandenburg-Prussia, with the latter accepting the annexation of Baltic territories and paying Russia expenses in return for the southern part of Pomerania, recently taken from Sweden in the Great Northern War.
- October 17 – The Battle of Pälkäne is fought in what is now Finland between Russia and Sweden, with Russia's Fyodor Arpaskin forcing Finnish troops under Carl Gustaf Armfeldt to withdraw.
- November 6 – The Dublin election riot breaks out during the fiercely contested Irish General Election.
- November 12 – The 1713 British general election concludes with the conservative Tories winning 358 of the 558 available seats in the House of Commons, and the liberal Whigs having 200.
- December 9 – As part of the agreements made at Utrecht to end the War of the Spanish Succession, Great Britain and Spain sign a treaty of commerce and navigation.
- December 10 – The rebellion of Richard Raworth, Deputy Governor of Fort St. David (now abandoned and in the Indian state of Tamil Nadu near Cuddalore), against the British East India Company comes to an end after two months when forces sent by Bridish Madras Governor Edward Harrison to negotiate a settlement allowing Raworth to surrender in return for amnesty.
- December 21 – Victor Amadeus, Duke of Savoy is crowned King of Sicily at Palermo, and his wife Anne Marie is crowned as Queen consort. The coronation follows Spain's recognition of Sicilian independence, effective September 22, as part of the Treaty of Utrecht.

=== Date unknown ===
- Ars Conjectandi, a seminal work on probability by Jacob Bernoulli, is published eight years after his death, by his nephew, Niklaus Bernoulli.
- Basil Matthew II becomes Syriac Orthodox Maphrian of the East.
- San Basilio de Palenque officially becomes the first free African town in America, being the first independent place in America from Europeans.

== Births ==
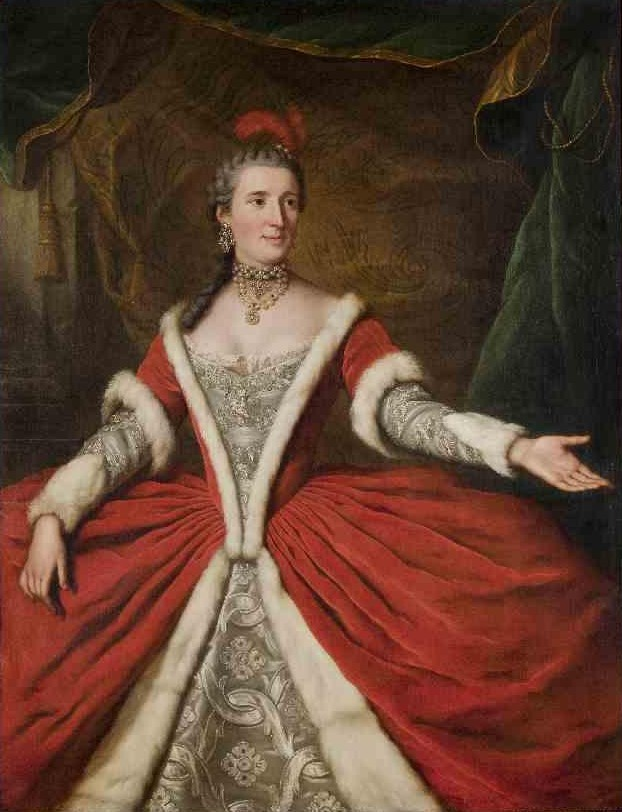
Marie Dumesnil born 2 January

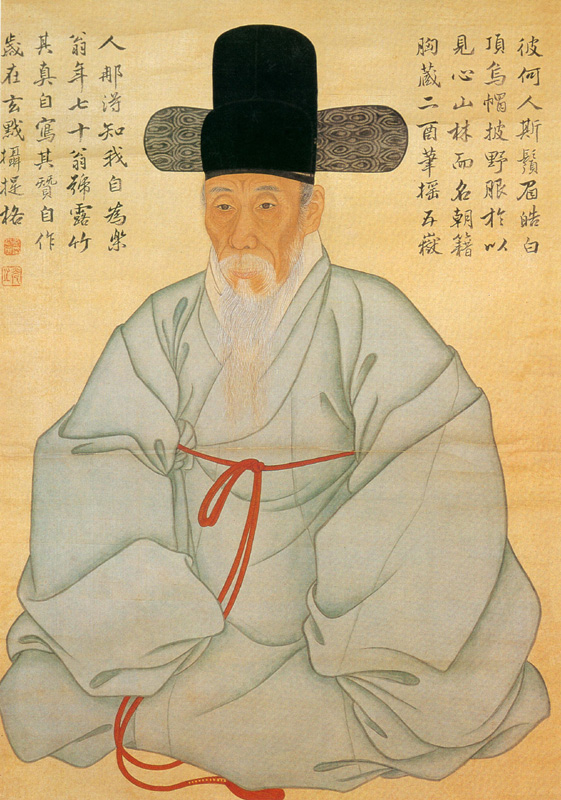
Kang Sehwang born 25 January

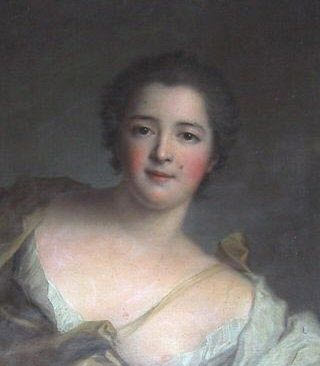
Diane Adélaïde de Mailly-Nesle born 11 February

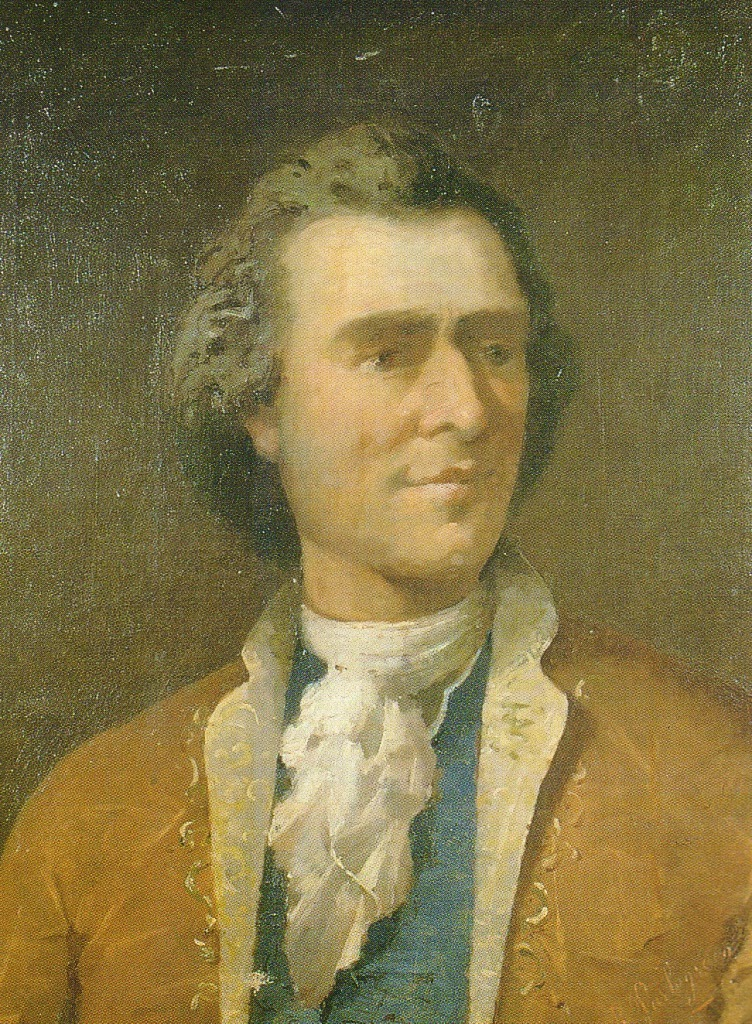
Domènec Terradellas born 13 February

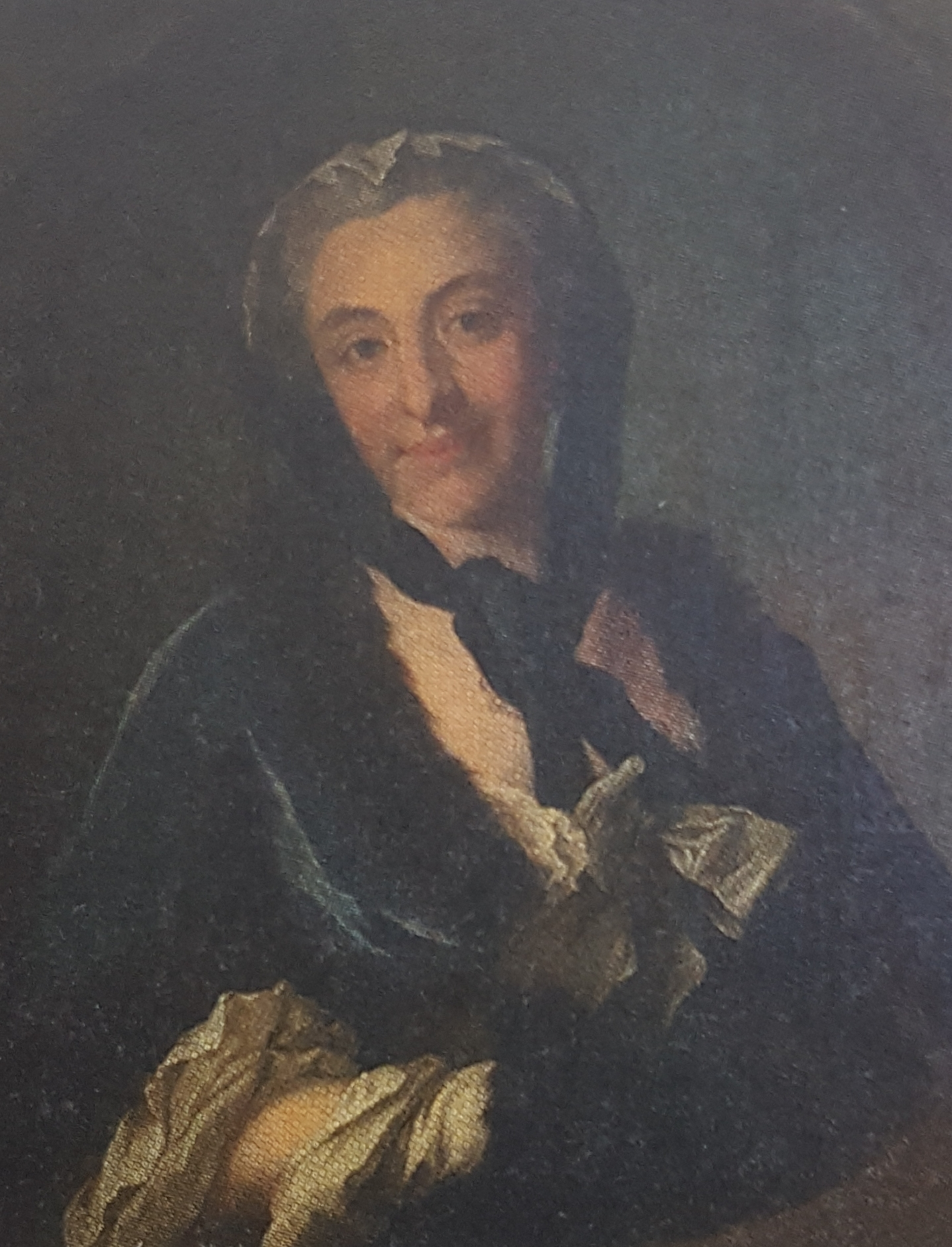
Anna Maria Elvia born 20 February

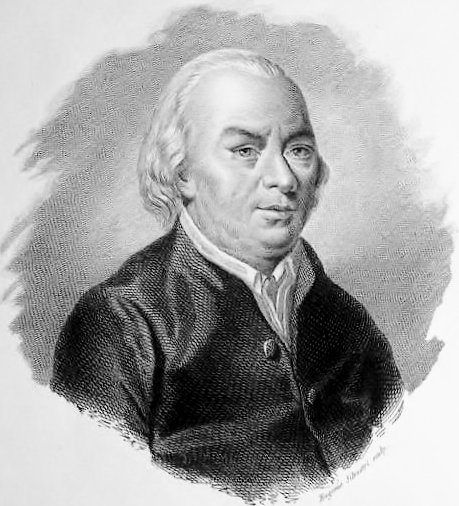
Gian Carlo Passeroni born 8 March

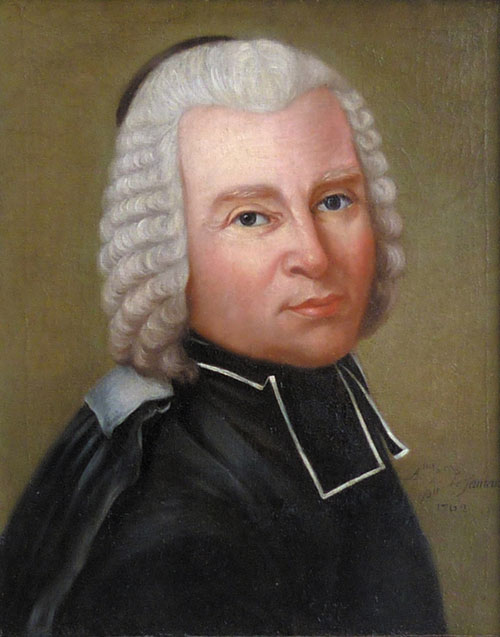
Nicolas-Louis de Lacaille born 15 March

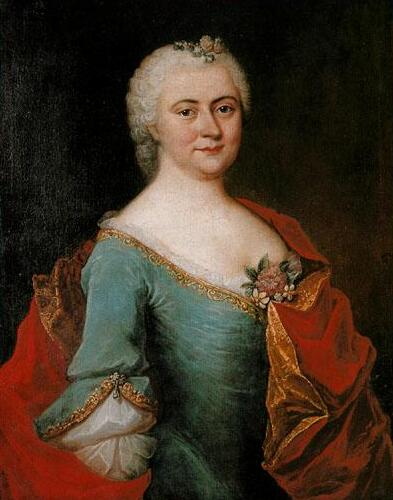
Luise Gottsched born 11 April

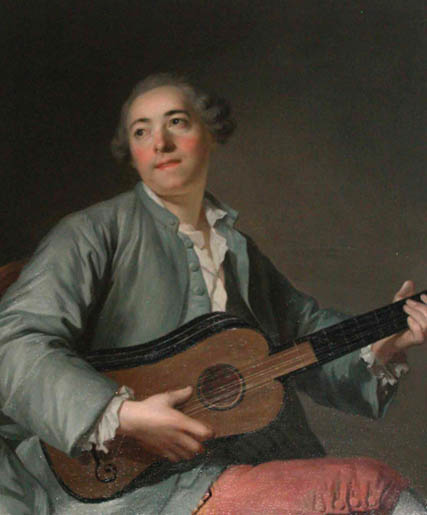
Pierre Jélyotte born 13 April

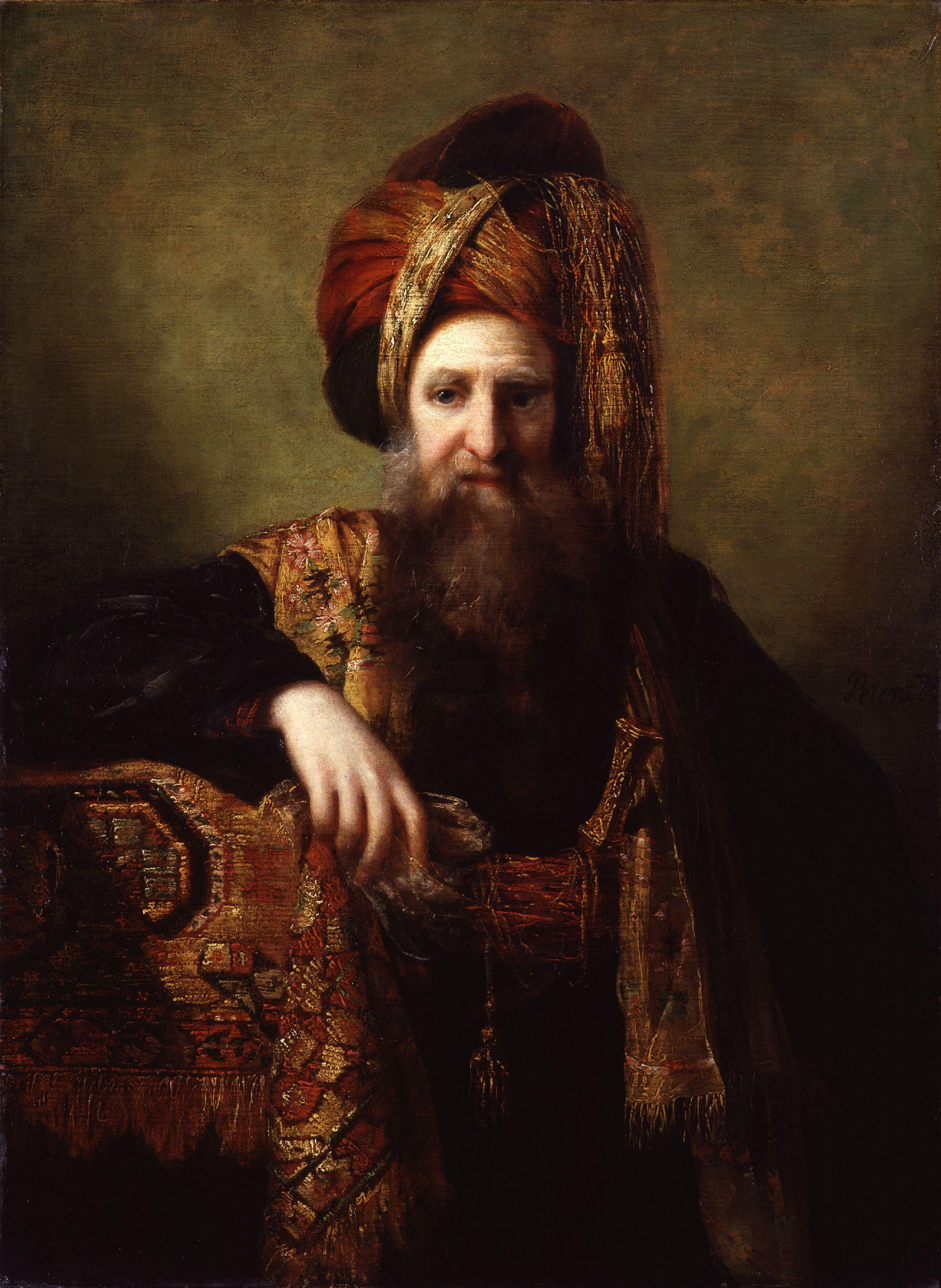
Edward Wortley Montagu born 15 May

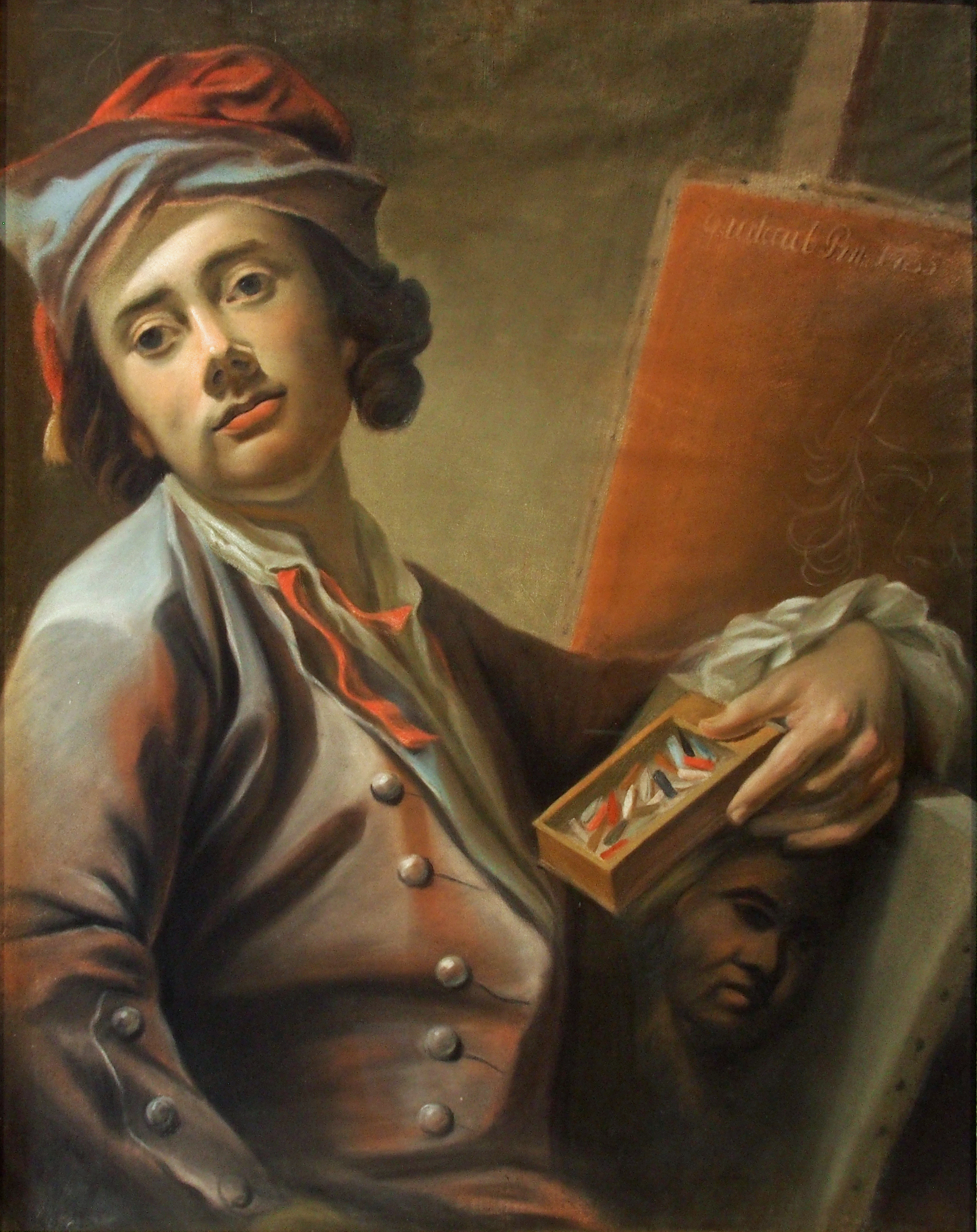
Georg Anton Urlaub born 20 June

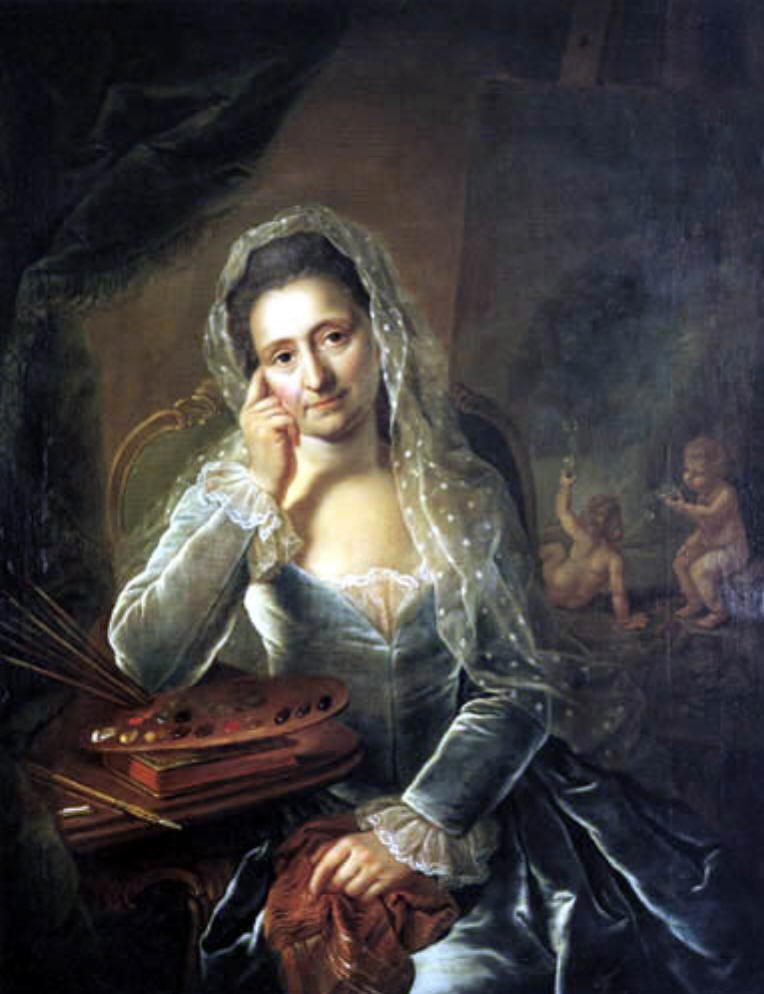
Anna Rosina de Gasc born 10 July

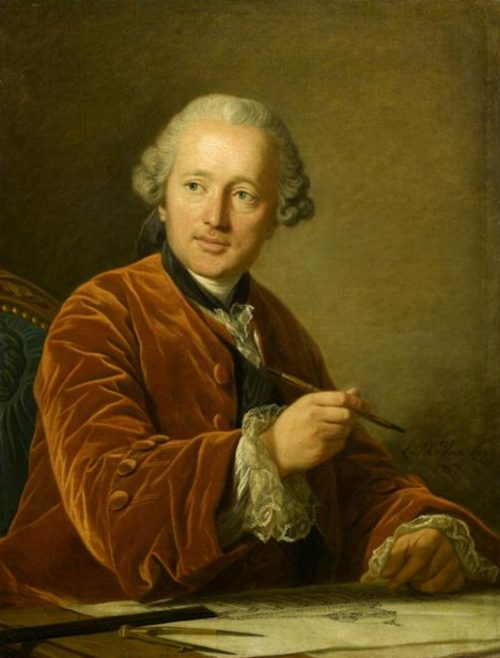
Jacques-Germain Soufflot born 22 July

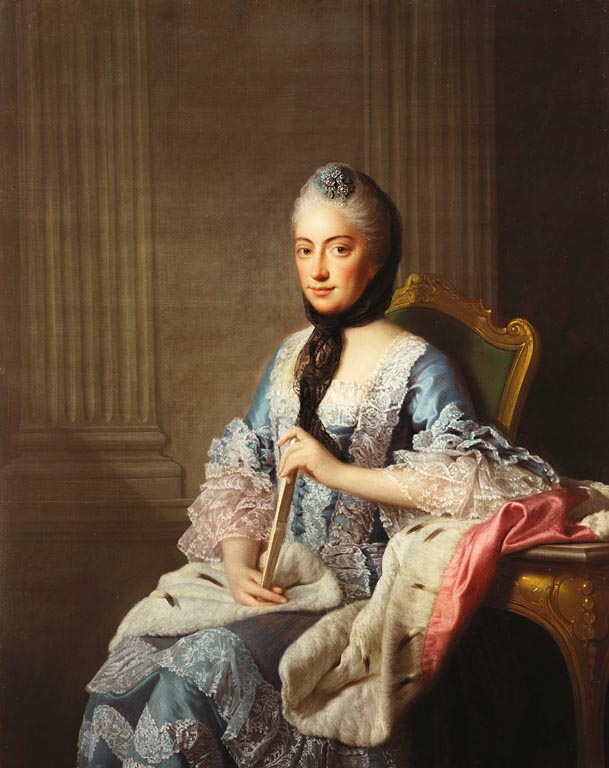
Princess Elisabeth Albertine of Saxe-Hildburghausen born 4 August

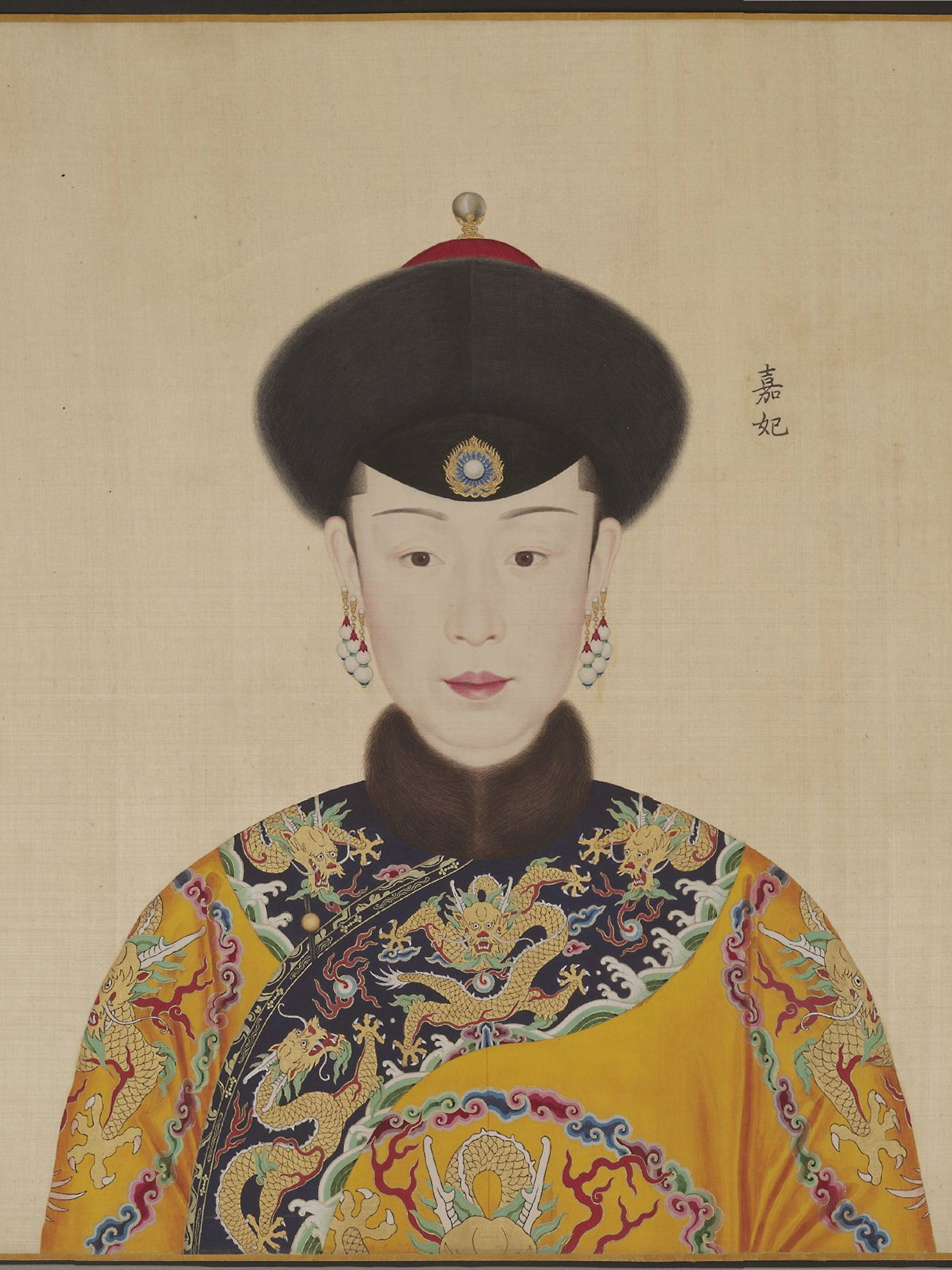
Imperial Noble Consort Shujia born 14 September

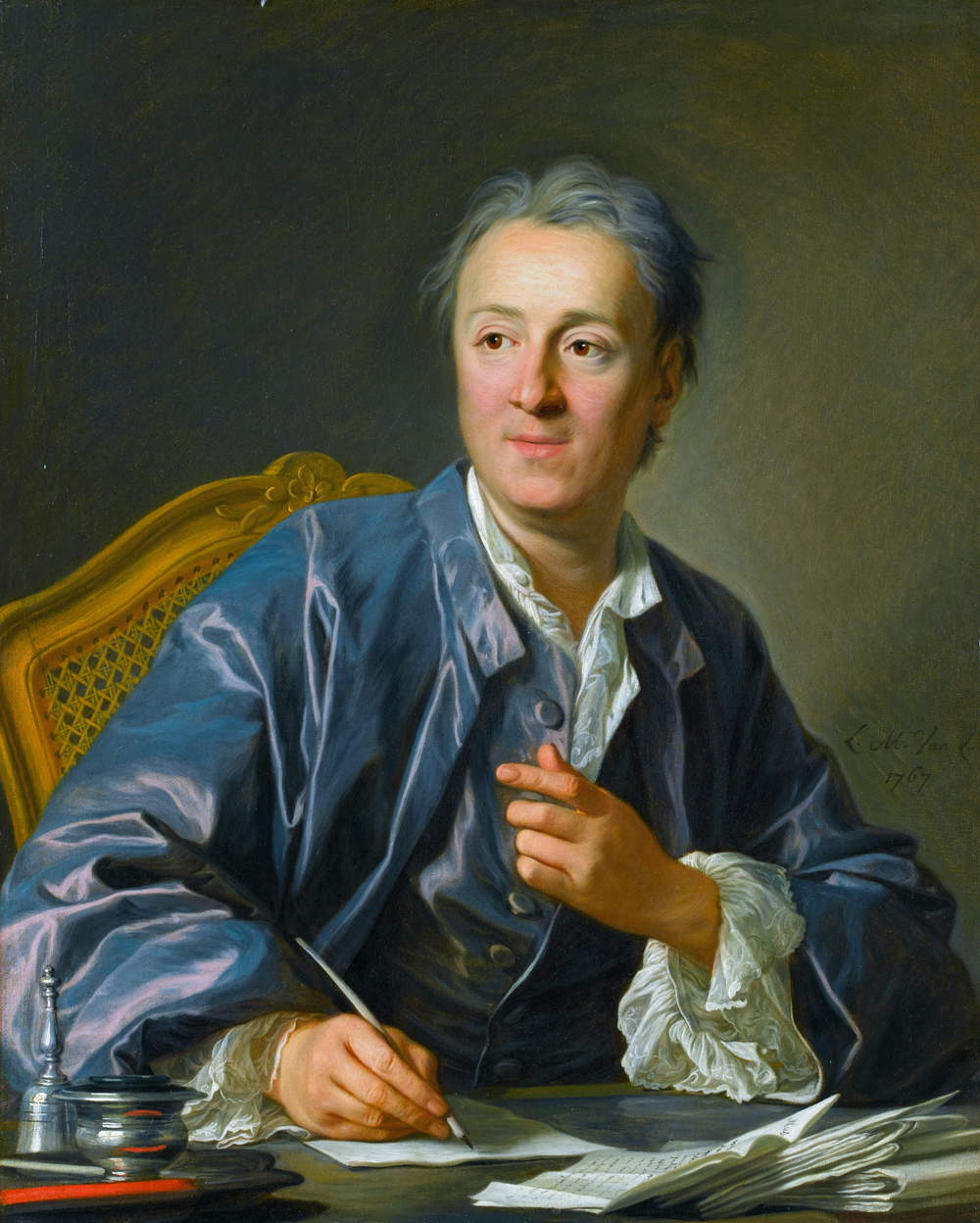
Denis Diderot born 5 October

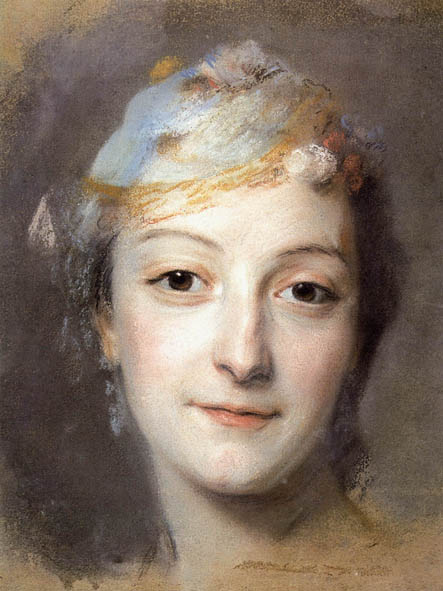
Marie Fel born 24 October

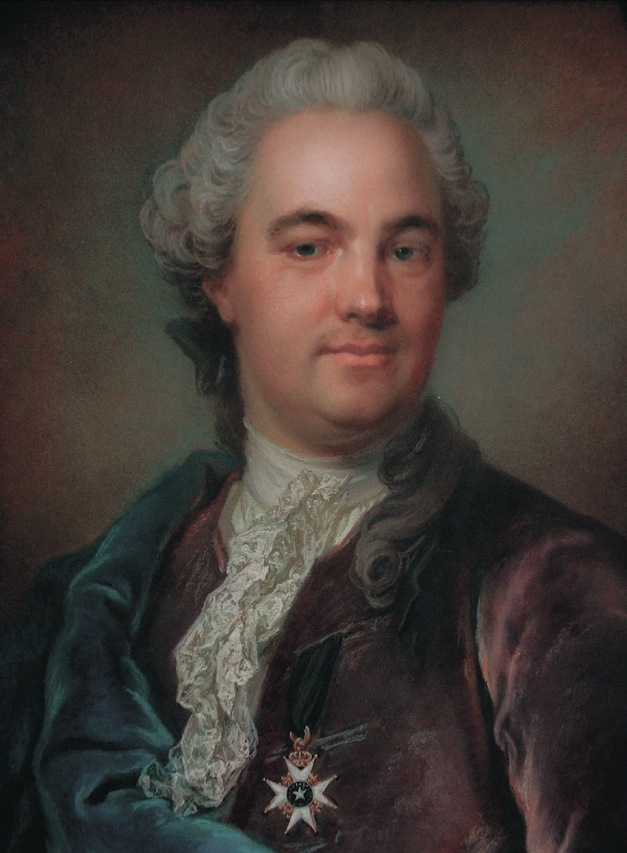
Abraham Bäck born 9 December

=== January ===
- January 1 – Carl Gustaf Warmholtz, Swedish writer (d. 1785)
- January 2 – Marie Dumesnil, French actress (d. 1803)
- January 5 – Jorge Juan y Santacilia, Spanish mathematician and naval officer (d. 1773)
- January 7 – Giovanni Battista Locatelli, Italian impresario and librettist (d. 1785)
- January 13 – Charlotte Charke, British actor and writer (d. 1760)
- January 17 – Jean Chrétien Fischer, French general (d. 1762)
- January 18 – Grigory Spiridov, Russian admiral (d. 1790)
- January 22 – Marc-Antoine Laugier, French Jesuit priest and architectural theorist (d. 1769)
- January 25 – Kang Sehwang, Joseon Dynasty painter (d. 1791)
- January 29 – Edmé-François Mallet, French writer (d. 1755)
- January 31
  - Anthony Benezet, French-born American abolitionist and educator (d. 1784)
  - Adam Drummond, Scottish merchant banker and politician (d. 1786)

=== February ===
- February 2 – Maria Margarida de Lorena, 2nd Duchess of Abrantes, Portuguese noblewoman and courtier (d. 1780)
- February 5 – Edwin Lascelles, 1st Baron Harewood, British Baron (d. 1795)
- February 7 – Sir Henry Moore, 1st Baronet, Governor of Jamaica and New York (d. 1769)
- February 11 – Diane Adélaïde de Mailly-Nesle, Mistress of Louis XV (d. 1769)
- February 12 – Kenrick Clayton, British politician (d. 1769)
- February 13 – Domènec Terradellas, Spanish opera composer (d. 1751)
- February 14
  - Jan ten Compe, painter from the Northern Netherlands (d. 1761)
  - Vittoria Ligari, Italian painter (d. 1783)
- February 20 – Anna Maria Elvia, Swedish feminist writer (d. 1784)
- February 26 – Pyotr Sheremetev, Russian noble (d. 1788)
- February 28 – Louis-Auguste-Augustin d'Affry, French diplomat (d. 1793)

=== March ===
- March 2 – Giammaria Ortes, Italian composer and academic (d. 1790)
- March 5
  - Edward Cornwallis, British military officer, first Governor of Nova Scotia (d. 1776)
  - Frederick Cornwallis, Archbishop of Canterbury (d. 1783)
- March 8 – Gian Carlo Passeroni, Italian writer (d. 1803)
- March 9 – Daniel Fones, American military commander (d. 1790)
- March 12 – Johann Adolph Hass, German clavichord maker (d. 1771)
- March 15 – Nicolas-Louis de Lacaille, French astronomer (d. 1762)
- March 17 – Sir Charles Asgill, 1st Baronet, British politician (d. 1788)
- March 21 – Francis Lewis, Signatory of the US Declaration of Independence, from Wales (d. 1803)
- March 23 – Bowen Southwell, Irish politician (d. 1796)
- March 26 – Peter Oliver, Massachusetts loyalist colonial judge (d. 1791)
- March 28 – Juan Nentvig, German anthropologist (d. 1768)
- March 29 – John Ponsonby, Irish politician (d. 1787)

=== April ===
- April 2 – Pier Francesco Foggini, Italian writer (d. 1783)
- April 3 – William Inglis, Scottish surgeon (d. 1792)
- April 7 – Nicola Sala, Italian opera composer and music theorist (d. 1801)
- April 10 – John Whitehurst, English clockmaker (d. 1788)
- April 11 – Luise Gottsched, German poet, playwright, essayist and translator (d. 1762)
- April 12
  - Sir Edward Crofton, 4th Baronet, Anglo-Irish politician (d. 1745)
  - Guillaume Thomas François Raynal, French writer, man of letters (d. 1796)
- April 13 – Pierre Jélyotte, French operatic tenor (d. 1797)
- April 17 – Samuel Graves, British Royal Navy admiral (d. 1787)
- April 21
  - Anna Maria Hilfeling, Swedish artist (d. 1783)
  - Louis de Noailles, French peer and Marshal of France (d. 1793)
- April 22
  - Brita Sophia De la Gardie, Swedish actress (d. 1797)
  - Peter Du Cane Sr., British businessman (d. 1803)

=== May ===
- May 6 – Charles Batteux, French philosopher, writer on aesthetics (d. 1780)
- May 7 – Charles Townley, British Officer of Arms (d. 1774)
- May 11 – James Drummond, 3rd Duke of Perth, Scottish Jacobite army officer (d. 1746)
- May 13
  - Alexis Clairaut, French mathematician, astronomer, and geophysicist (d. 1765)
  - Louis François de Monteynard, French soldier, statesman (d. 1791)
- May 15
  - József Károly Hell, Hungarian mining engineer (d. 1789)
  - Edward Wortley Montagu, British politician, traveller and author (d. 1776)
- May 17 – Élie Bertrand, Swiss scientist (d. 1797)
- May 25
  - Andrzej Mokronowski, Polish general (d. 1783)
  - John Stuart, 3rd Earl of Bute, British politician, Prime Minister of Great Britain (d. 1792)
- May 31 – Giuseppe Maria Buonaparte, Corsican politician (d. 1763)

=== June ===
- June 3 – Robert Petre, 8th Baron Petre, British peer, renowned horticulturist (d. 1742)
- June 10 – Princess Caroline of Great Britain, fourth child and third daughter of George II (d. 1757)
- June 11
  - John Allen, 3rd Viscount Allen, Irish politician (d. 1745)
  - Edward Capell, English Shakespearean scholar; (d. 1781)
- June 13
  - Imperial Noble Consort Chunhui, Consort of Chinese Emperor (d. 1760)
  - Antonio Eugenio Visconti, Italian cardinal (d. 1788)
- June 16 – Meshech Weare, First Governor of New Hampshire (d. 1786)
- June 17 – Hongjiao, Chinese Qing dynasty imperial prince (d. 1764)
- June 20 – Georg Anton Urlaub, German painter (d. 1759)
- June 22 – Lord John Sackville, English gentleman and cricketer (d. 1765)
- June 25 – Marie-Marguerite Brun, French poet (d. 1794)
- June 29 – Johannes de Bosch, painter from the Northern Netherlands (d. 1785)

=== July ===
- July 1 – Benjamin Green, Nova Scotian merchant, judge, and political figure (d. 1772)
- July 5
  - Stanhope Aspinwall, British diplomat (d. 1771)
  - Jean Godin des Odonais, French cartographer and naturalist (d. 1792)
- July 9 – John Newbery, English publisher and bookseller (d. 1767)
- July 10 – Anna Rosina de Gasc, German portrait painter (d. 1783)
- July 14 – Nicole du Hausset, French memoirist (d. 1801)
- July 16 – Carlo Murena, architect (d. 1764)
- July 18
  - Robert Dundas of Arniston, the younger, Scottish judge (d. 1787)
  - Gaetano Matteo Pisoni, Swiss-Italian architect (d. 1782)
- July 22 – Jacques-Germain Soufflot, French architect in neoclassicism (d. 1780)
- July 23
  - Juan de Miralles, Spanish diplomat (d. 1780)
  - Luís António Verney, Portuguese philosopher and pedagogue (d. 1792)
- July 27 – Princess Sophie Charlotte of Brandenburg-Bayreuth, duchess consort of Saxe-Weimar (d. 1746)

=== August ===
- August 1 – Charles I, Duke of Brunswick-Wolfenbüttel, Duke of Brunswick-Wolfenbüttel (d. 1780)
- August 3 – Johan Georg Lillienberg, Swedish count and politician (d. 1798)
- August 4
  - Bernardo de Miera y Pacheco, Spanish cartographer (d. 1785)
  - Princess Elisabeth Albertine of Saxe-Hildburghausen, Duchess consort of Mecklenburg-Strelitz (d. 1761)
- August 6 – Marie Sophie de Courcillon, French noblewoman and Duchess of Rohan-Rohan, Princess of Soubise by marriage (d. 1756)
- August 9 – James Murray, loyalist during the American Revolution (d. 1781)
- August 11 – Lebbeus Harris, Canadian politician (d. 1792)
- August 13 – David Franco Mendes, Dutch poet (d. 1792)
- August 17 – Antoine de Montazet, French archbishop (d. 1788)
- August 18 – Arthur Champagne, Irish Anglican priest (d. 1799)
- August 25 – Vijaya Raghunatha Raya Tondaiman I, Raja of Pudukkottai (d. 1769)
- August 27 – Anton August Beck, German engraver (d. 1787)

=== September ===
- September 3 – Jean Baptiste de La Vérendrye, one of the founders of the present province of Manitoba (d. 1736)
- September 9 – Robert Bremner, British music publisher (d. 1789)
- September 10
  - Gowin Knight, British physicist (d. 1772)
  - John Needham, English biologist and Roman Catholic priest (d. 1781)
- September 13 – Giuseppe Maria Buondelmonti, Italian philosopher (d. 1757)
- September 14
  - Johann Kies, German astronomer and mathematician (d. 1781)
  - Imperial Noble Consort Shujia, consort of the Qianlong Emperor (d. 1755)
- September 16 – Charles Lucas, Irish apothecary, physician and politician (d. 1771)
- September 20 – Louis Du Pont Duchambon de Vergor, French military officer (d. 1775)
- September 21 – Domingo de Bonechea, Spanish explorer (d. 1775)
- September 22 – Ferenc Farkas de Boldogfa, Hungarian nobleman, jurist, landowner, vice-ispán of the county of Zala (d. 1770)
- September 23 – Ferdinand VI, king of Spain (d. 1759)

=== October ===
- October 2 – Henry Tucker of The Grove, Bermudian merchant, politician and Militia officer (d. 1787)
- October 3 – Antoine Dauvergne, French composer and violinist (d. 1797)
- October 5 – Denis Diderot, French philosopher (d. 1784)
- October 7 – Granville Elliott, Army General, British military expert, working for Britain and Palatine forces (d. 1759)
- October 8 – Yechezkel Landau, influential Polish authority on halakha (Jewish law) (d. 1793)
- October 9 – Mikhail Volkonsky, Russian statesman and military figure from the House of Volkonsky (d. 1788)
- October 12 – Khawaja Muhammad Zaman of Luari, Sindhi Sufi poet (d. 1775)
- October 13
  - Allan Ramsay, Scottish portrait painter (d. 1784)
  - Jacques de Romas, French physicist (d. 1776)
- October 20
  - Benjamin Andrew, American politician (d. 1790)
  - James Cecil, 6th Earl of Salisbury, English noble (d. 1780)
  - Joseph Redlhamer, Austrian physicist (d. 1761)
- October 23 – Pieter Burman the Younger, Dutch lawyer and philologist (d. 1778)
- October 24 – Marie Fel, French opera singer (d. 1794)
- October 30 – Giuseppe Antonio Landi, Italian architect and painter (d. 1791)

=== November ===
- November 1 – Antonio Genovesi, Italian economist (d. 1769)
- November 5 – Gorges Lowther, Member of the Irish House of Commons (d. 1792)
- November 6 – Thomas Osborne, 4th Duke of Leeds, British politician (d. 1789)
- November 13 – Nicolas Luton Durival, French historian (d. 1795)
- November 14 – Blasius Columban, Baron von Bender, Luxembourgish politician (d. 1798)
- November 17 – August de la Motte, German general (d. 1788)
- November 24
  - Junípero Serra, Spanish Christian missionary (d. 1784)
  - Laurence Sterne, Anglo-Irish novelist and Anglican cleric (d. 1768)
- November 28 – Georg Friedrich Brander, German precision mechanic and mathematician (d. 1783)
- November 30 – Johann Balthasar Bullinger, Swiss landscape painter (d. 1793)

=== December ===
- December 4 – Gasparo Gozzi, Venetian critic and dramatist (d. 1786)
- December 9 – Abraham Bäck, physician (d. 1795)
- December 10 – Johann Nicolaus Mempel, German composer and musician (d. 1747)
- December 13 – John Baptist Caryll, third Jacobite Baron Caryll of Durford (d. 1788)
- December 14 – Martin Knutzen, German philosopher (d. 1751)
- December 15 – Welbore Ellis, 1st Baron Mendip, English politician (d. 1802)
- December 17 – Antoine-Noé de Polier de Bottens, Swiss theologian (d. 1783)
- December 19 – Jonathan Toup, British philologist (d. 1785)
- December 23 – Maruyama Gondazaemon, Japanese sumo wrestler (d. 1749)
- December 27 – Giovanni Battista Borra, Italian architect and engineer (d. 1770)
- December 29
  - André-Joseph Blavier, Belgian composer (d. 1782)
  - Nicolas Louis de Lacaille, French astronomer (d. 1762)
  - Herman Petersen, Swedish merchant (d. 1765)

== Deaths ==
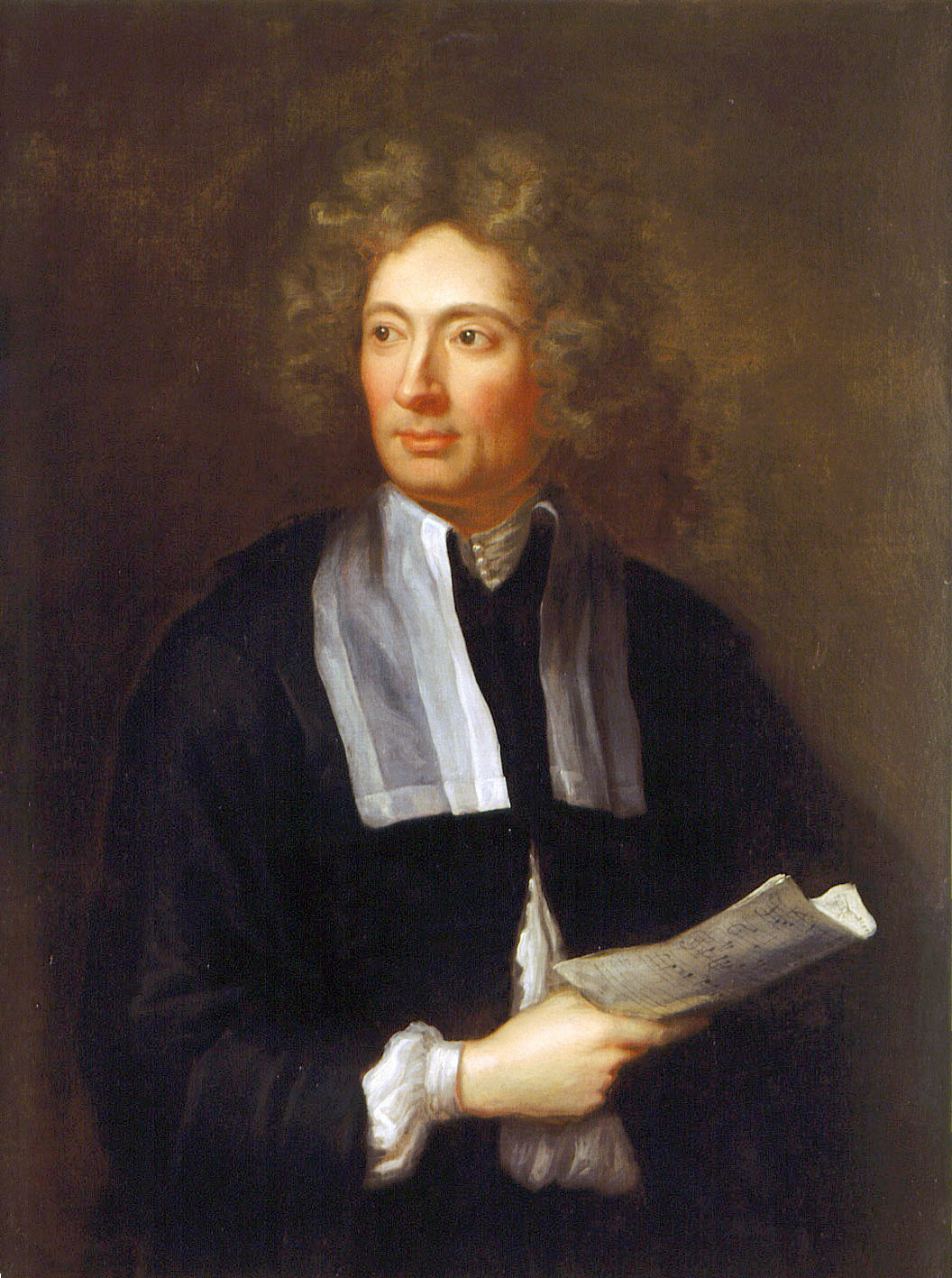
Arcangelo Corelli died 8 January

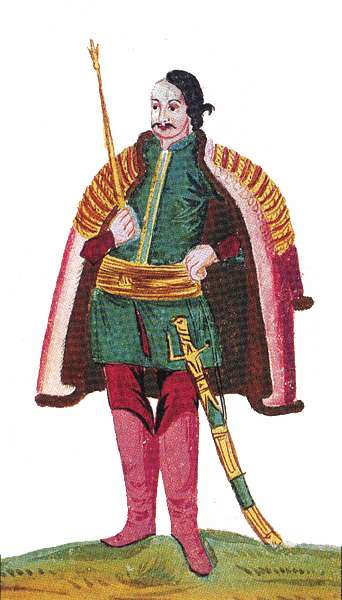
Michael II Apafi died 1 February

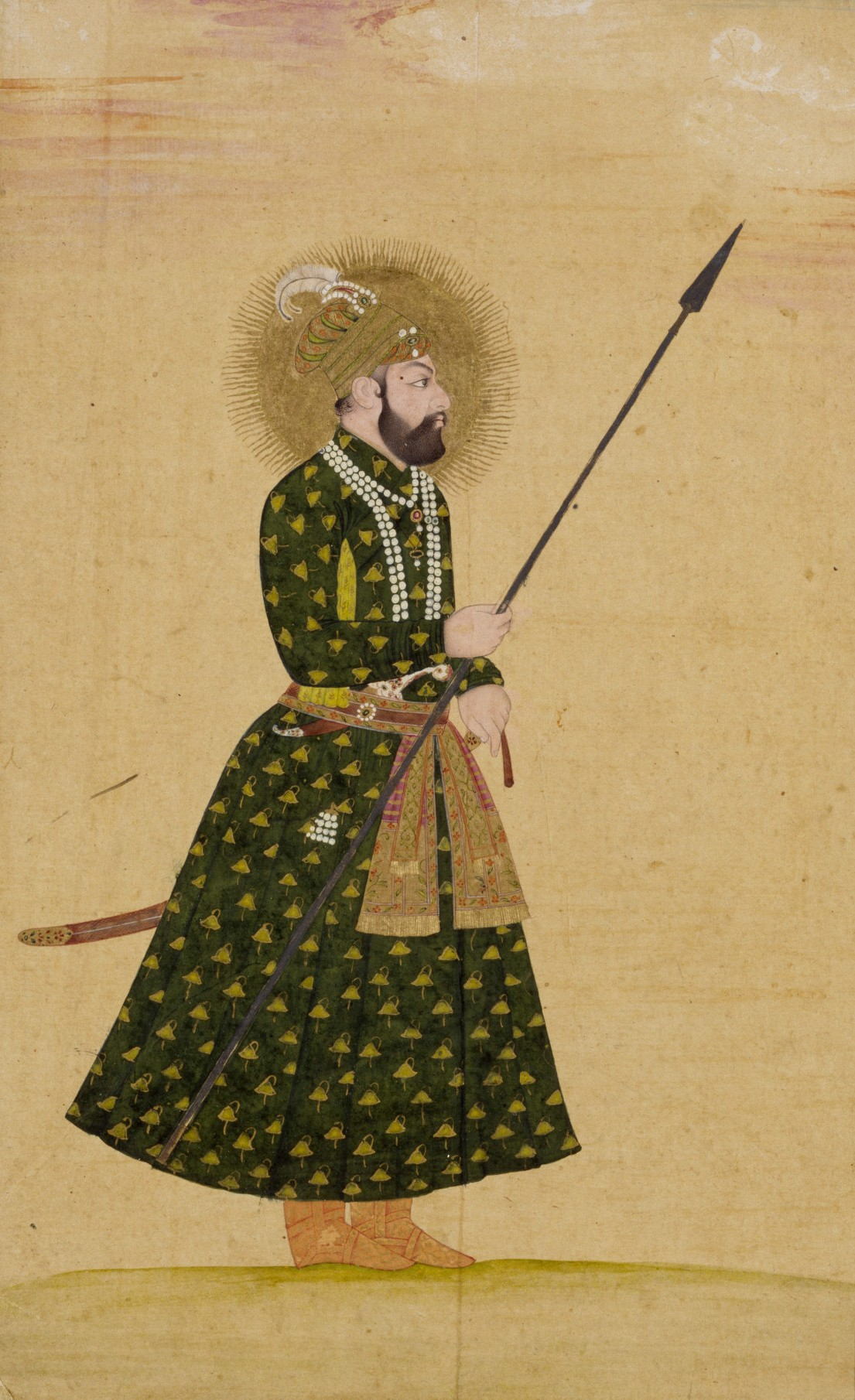
Jahandar Shah died 12 February

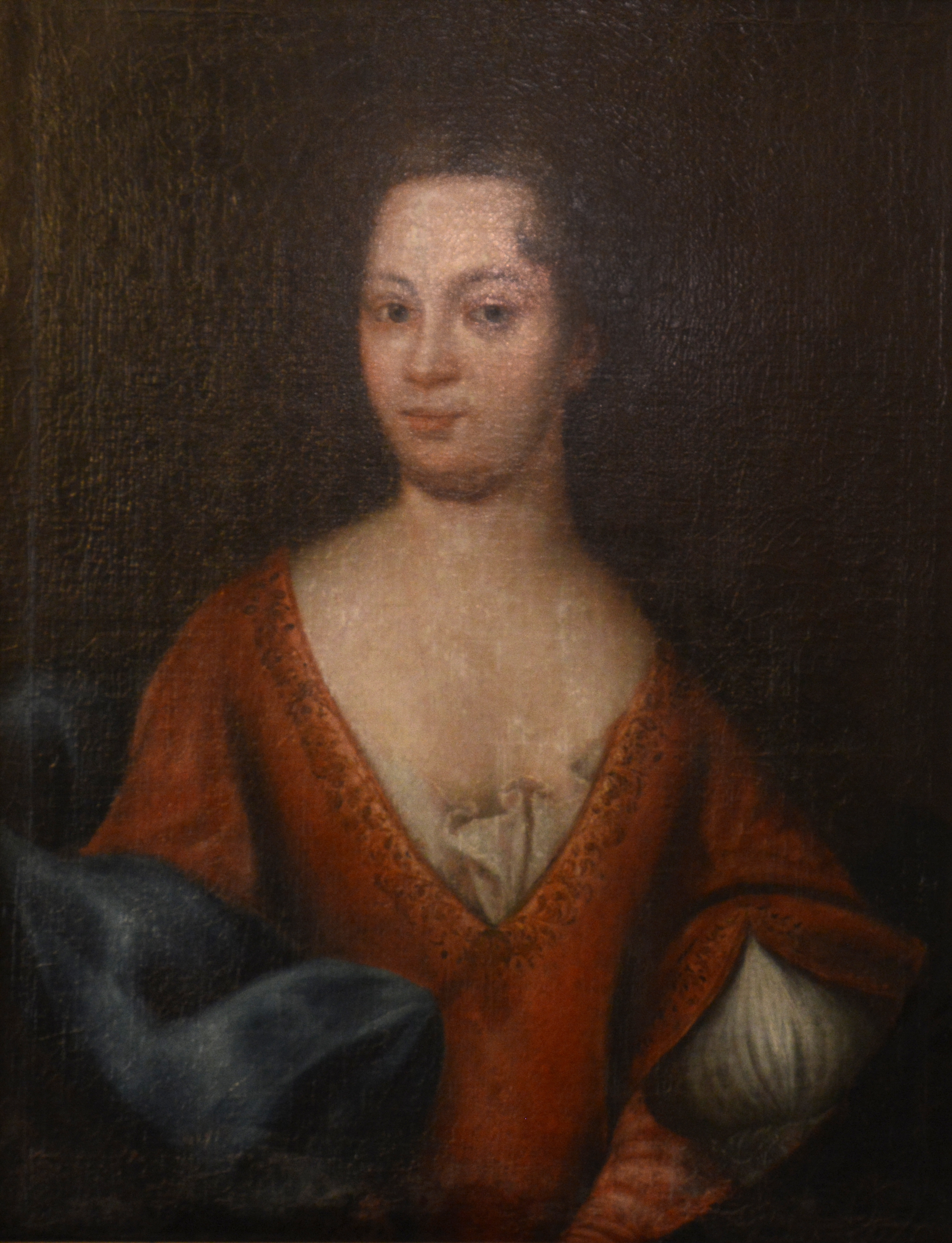
Anne Clausdatter died 11 April

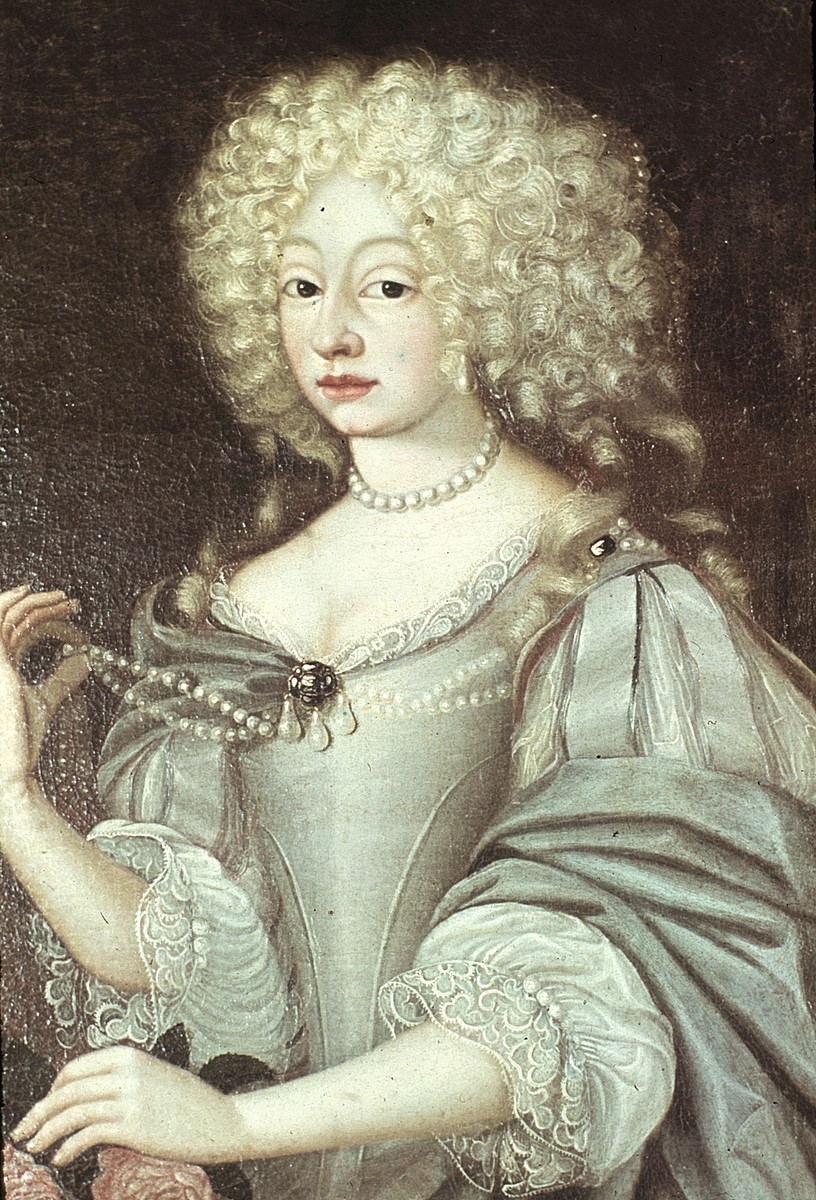
Dorothea Marie of Saxe-Gotha-Altenburg died 18 April

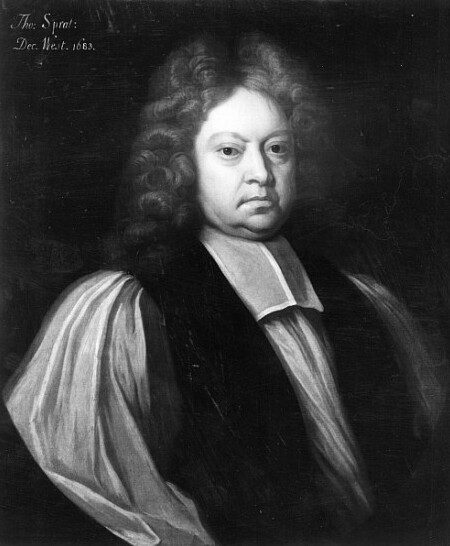
Thomas Sprat died 20 May

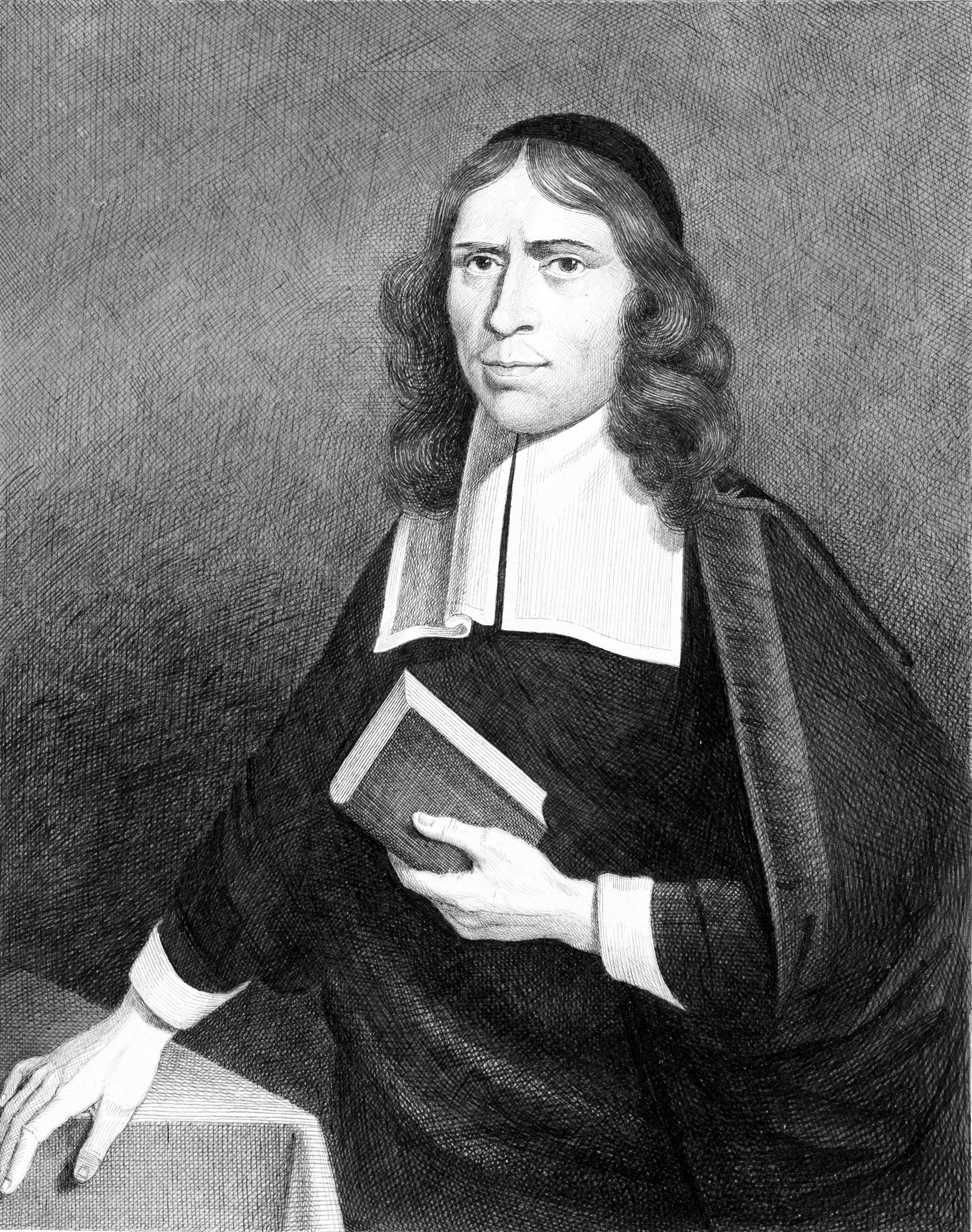
Georg Otho died 28 May

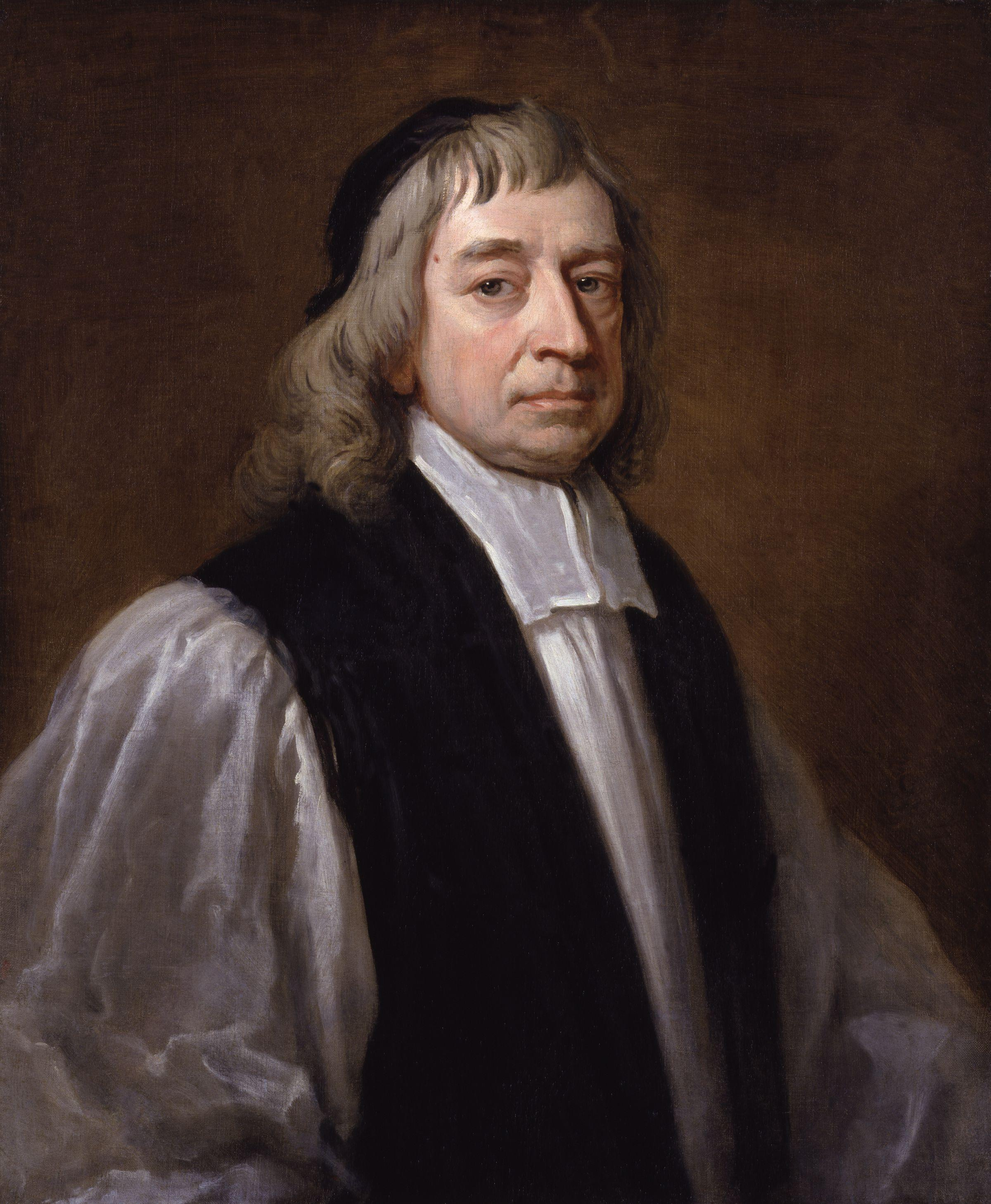
Henry Compton (bishop) died 7 July

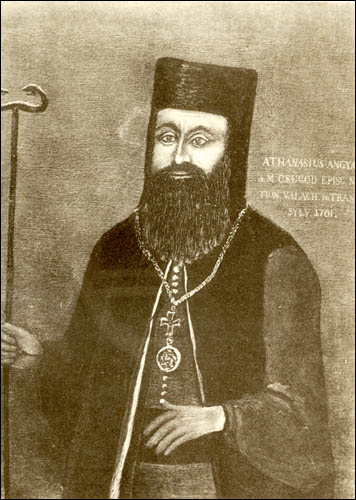
Atanasie Anghel died 19 August

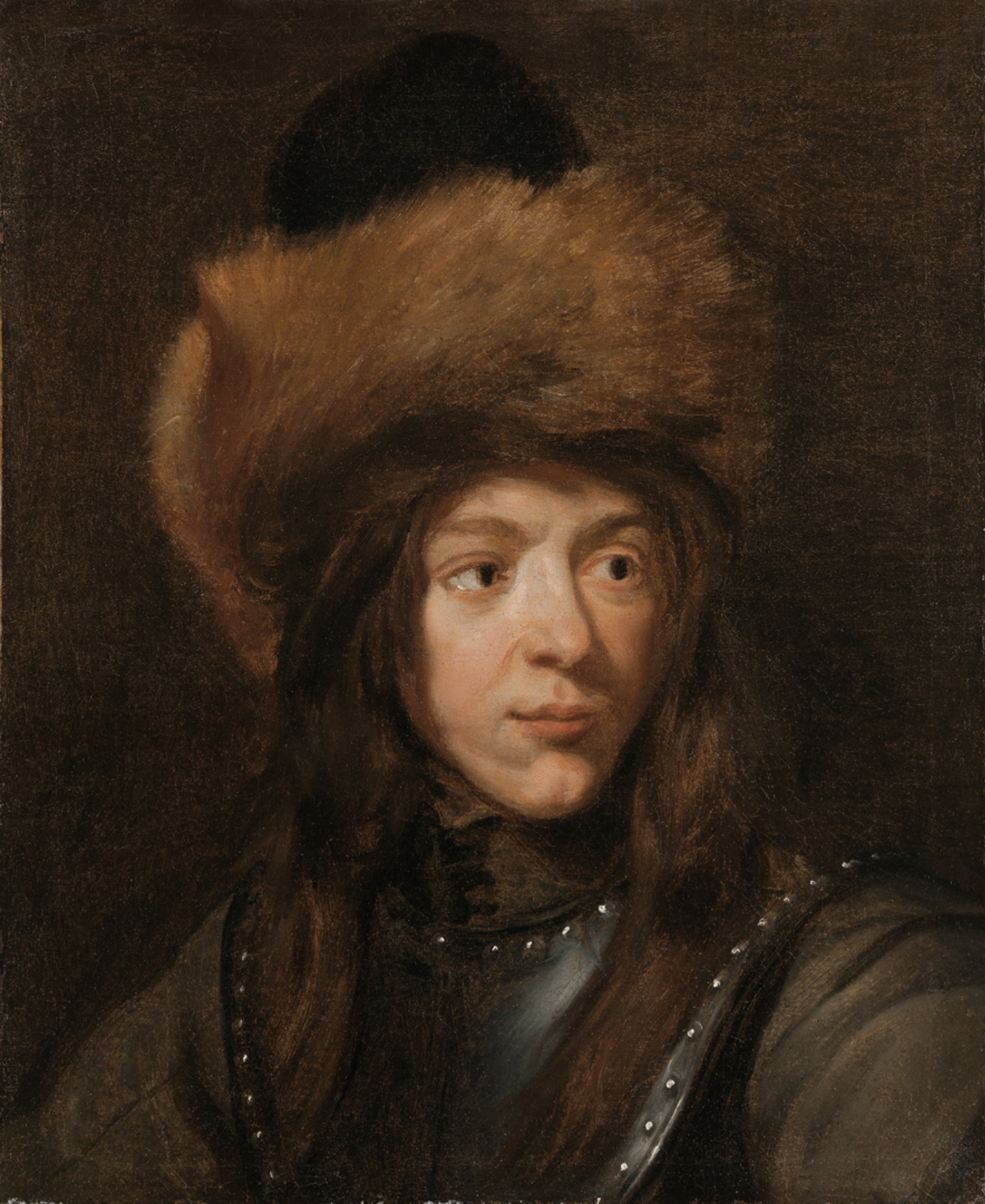
Jacob van Oost the Younger died 29 September

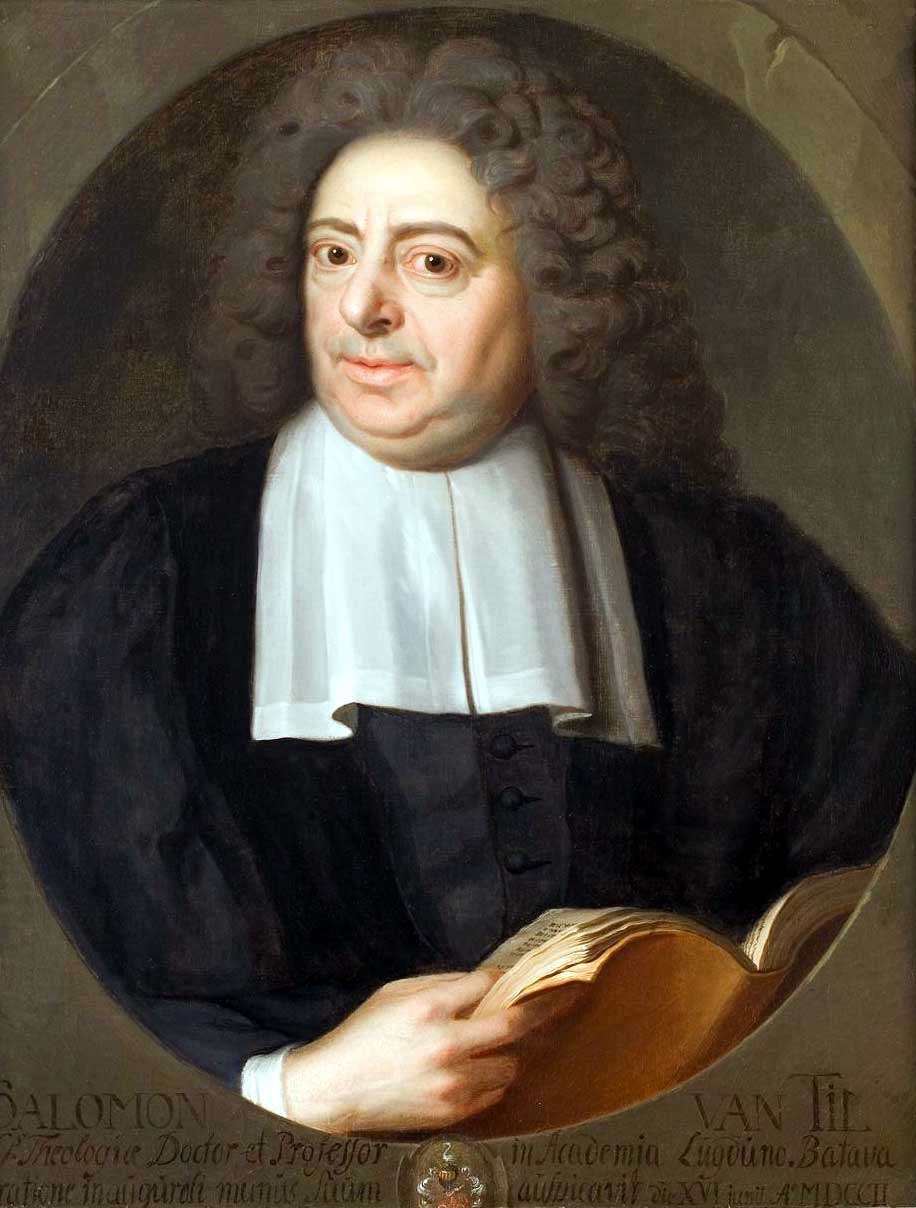
Salomon van Til died 31 October

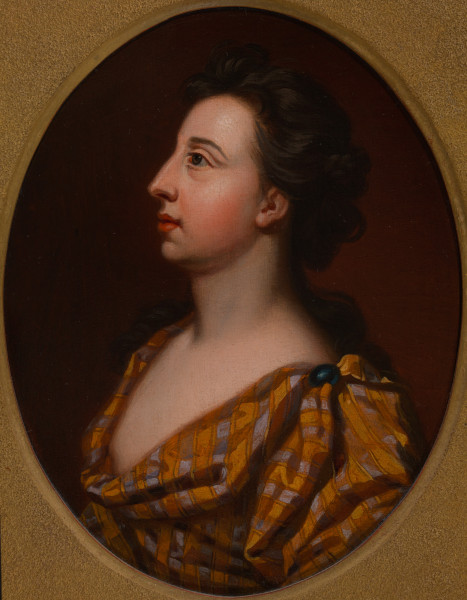
Elizabeth Barry died 7 November

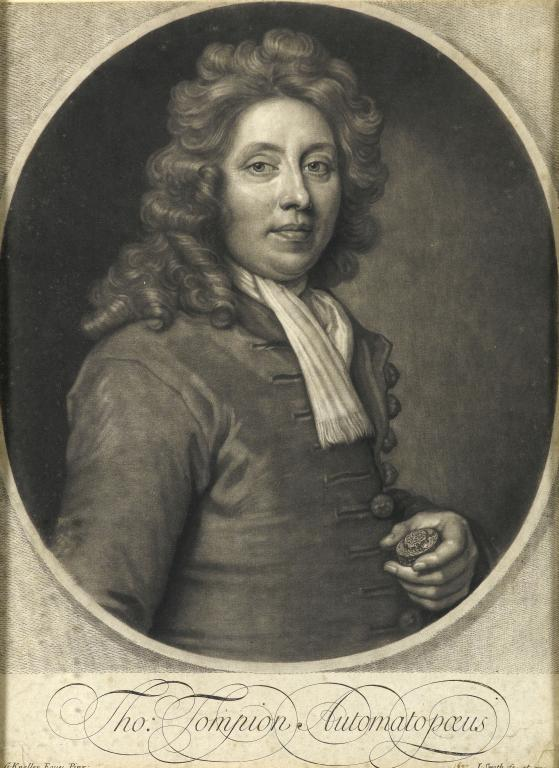
Thomas Tompion died 20 November

=== January ===
- January 1
  - Giovanni Francesco Negroni, Italian cardinal (b. 1629)
  - Giuseppe Maria Tomasi, Italian Roman Catholic cardinal (b. 1649)
- January 2 – Lady Mary Butler, British noble; (b. 1689)
- January 5 – Jean Chardin, French jeweler, traveler and author (b. 1643)
- January 8 – Arcangelo Corelli, Italian violinist and composer (b. 1653)
- January 11 – Pierre Jurieu, French Protestant leader (b. 1637)
- January 12 – John Vaughan, 3rd Earl of Carbery, Governor of Jamaica, President of the British Royal Society (b. 1639)
- January 20 – Pavao Ritter Vitezović, Croatian writer, historian, linguist and publisher (b. 1652)
- January 26 – Scrope Howe, 1st Viscount Howe, English politician (b. 1648)

=== February ===
- February 1 – Michael II Apafi, Prince of Transylvania (b. 1676)
- February 2 – Marko Mesić, Croatian Roman Catholic priest (b. 1640)
- February 3 – William Milman, English lawyer (b. 1650)
- February 4 – Anthony Ashley-Cooper, 3rd Earl of Shaftesbury, English politician and philosopher (b. 1671)
- February 11 – Zulfiqar Khan Nusrat Jung, Nawab of the Carnatic (b. 1657)
- February 12
  - Florence MacMoyer, last hereditary keeper of the Book of Armagh, (b. 1630)
  - Jahandar Shah, Mughal emperor (b. 1661)
  - Michele Antonio Vibò, Roman Catholic prelate, Archbishop of Turin, Apostolic Internuncio to France (b. 1630)
- February 14
  - Louis Crato, Count of Nassau-Saarbrücken (b. 1663)
  - William Harrison, English poet and diplomat (b. 1685)
- February 15 – Carlo Vigarani, Italian scenic designer (b. 1637)
- February 25 – King Frederick I of Prussia (b. 1657)
- February 26 – William Paget, 6th Baron Paget, English peer and ambassador (b. 1637)
- February 28 – Samuel Whiting Jr., American clergyman 1633–1713 (b. 1633)

=== March ===
- March 4 – Ireneo della Croce, Carmelite preacher and chronicler (b. 1625)
- March 14 – Mary Cromwell, Countess Fauconberg, daughter of Oliver Cromwell (b. 1637)
- March 15 – Wolfgang William Romer, Dutch military engineer (b. 1640)
- March 17 – Juraj Jánošík, Slovak outlaw, known as the Slovak Robin Hood (executed) (b. 1688)
- March 20 – Owen Buckingham, MP and Lord Mayor of London (b. 1649)
- March 21 – Feodor Lopukhin, Russian lawyer, nobleman, colonel, courtier and Boyar (b. 1638)
- March 22 – Robert Petre, 7th Baron Petre, British peer (b. 1689)
- March 24 – Toussaint de Forbin-Janson, French Catholic cardinal and Bishop of Beauvais (b. 1631)
- March 26
  - Paul I, Prince Esterházy, Palatine of Hungary and Prince of Holy Roman Empire (b. 1635)
  - Charles de Sévigné, French baron (b. 1648)
- March 29 – Christian Thomsen Carl, Danish naval officer (b. 1676)
- March 30 – Govert Bidloo, Dutch physician, anatomist, poet and playwright (b. 1649)

=== April ===
- April 3 – Henri, Count of Brionne, French noble (b. 1661)
- April 8
  - Leonardo Marsili, Roman Catholic archbishop (b. 1641)
  - Lucas Smout the Younger, Flemish painter (b. 1671)
- April 11 – Anne Clausdatter, Norwegian businesswoman (b. 1659)
- April 15 – Valentin Molitor, Swiss composer (b. 1637)
- April 17 – David Hollatz, German theologian (b. 1648)
- April 18 – Dorothea Marie of Saxe-Gotha-Altenburg, German princess (b. 1674)
- April 20 – John Hay, 2nd Marquess of Tweeddale, Scottish nobleman (b. 1645)
- April 21 – Paolo Naldini, Roman Catholic prelate, Bishop of Capodistria (b. 1632)
- April 24 – Edmund Meyrick, Welsh cleric (b. 1636)
- April 27 – Marie Elisabeth zu Mecklenburg, princess of Mecklenburg-Schwerin (b. 1646)

=== May ===
- May 3 – Salathiel Lovell, British judge (b. 1631)
- May 15 – Giuseppe Antonio Torri, architect (b. 1655)
- May 19 – Samuel Keeler, Connecticut politician (b. 1656)
- May 20 – Thomas Sprat, English minister (b. 1635)
- May 28 – Georg Otho, German librarian (b. 1634)

=== June ===
- June 11 – Felix Meyer, painter from Switzerland (b. 1653)

=== July ===
- July 7 – Henry Compton, Bishop of Oxford; Bishop of London (b. 1632)
- July 11 – Joseph Stennett, English Baptist minister and hymnwriter (b. 1663)
- July 25 – Thomas Northmore, English Member of Parliament (b. 1643)
- July 31 – Frederick William, Duke of Mecklenburg-Schwerin (b. 1675)

=== August ===
- August 2 – Artus de Lionne, French missionary (b. 1655)
- August 4 – William Cave, English cleric and scholar (b. 1637)
- August 10 – Giovanni Battista Visconti Aicardi, Roman Catholic prelate (b. 1644)
- August 15 – Kujō Morotaka, Japanese noble (b. 1688)
- August 19 – Atanasie Anghel, Romanian Greek-Catholic bishop of Alba Iulia (b. 1660)
- August 26 (bur.) – Denis Papin, French inventor (b. 1647)

=== September ===
- September 5 – Ivan Andreyevich Tolstoy, Russian noble (b. 1644)
- September 6 – François-Séraphin Régnier-Desmarais, French diplomat and writer (b. 1632)
- September 8 – Livio Odescalchi, Italian noble (b. 1652)
- September 9
  - Giovanni Antonio Viscardi, Swiss architect (b. 1645)
  - Johannes Voet, Dutch legal scholar (b. 1647)
- September 14 – Ōkubo Tadamasu, daimyo (b. 1656)
- September 15 – Tokugawa Yoshimichi, daimyo (b. 1689)
- September 20 – Francisco Martín Fernández de Posadas, Spanish presbyter (b. 1644)
- September 21 – Charles Fox, English politician (b. 1660)
- September 22 – Yurij Vynnyckyj, Metropolitan of Kiev (b. 1660)
- September 29 – Jacob van Oost the Younger, Flemish Baroque painter (b. 1639)

=== October ===
- October 5 – Charles Schomberg, Marquess of Harwich, British Army officer and noble (b. 1683)
- October 14 – Johan de la Faille, Dutch art collector (b. 1628)
- October 15 – Johann Michael Feuchtmayer the Elder, German artist (b. 1666)
- October 17 – Ambrose Crowley, English ironmonger (b. 1658)
- October 18 – Tripo Kokolja, Venetian painter (b. 1661)
- October 20 – Archibald Pitcairne, Scottish physician (b. 1652)
- October 22 – Sir John Cropley, 2nd Baronet, English politician (b. 1663)
- October 28 – Paolo Lorenzani, Italian composer (b. 1640)
- October 31
  - Ferdinando de' Medici, Grand Prince of Tuscany, Tuscan prince (b. 1663)
  - Salomon van Til, Dutch theologian (b. 1643)

=== November ===
- November 2 – Narcissus Marsh, English clergyman (b. 1638)
- November 6 – Franz Karl of Auersperg, Prince of Auersperg, Duke of Münsterberg (b. 1660)
- November 7 – Elizabeth Barry, British actress (b. 1658)
- November 8
  - Samuel Angier, English minister (b. 1639)
  - Fredrik Bagge, Swedish priest (b. 1646)
- November 9 – Armand Charles de La Porte de La Meilleraye, French general (b. 1632)
- November 17 – Abraham van Riebeeck, Governor-General of the Dutch East Indies (b. 1653)
- November 18 – Charles Hickman, Anglican Bishop of Derry (b. 1648)
- November 20 – Thomas Tompion, British clockmaker (b. 1638)
- November 26 – John Belding, Connecticut politician (b. 1650)
- November 30 – Nishio Tadanari, daimyo (b. 1653)

=== December ===
- December 1 – Richard Lowther, 2nd Viscount Lonsdale, English noble (b. 1692)
- December 2 – Gershom Bulkeley, Christian minister, physician, surgeon, magistrate (b. 1636)
- December 3 – Noadiah Russell, one of the clergymen who founded Yale (b. 1659)
- December 4 – François Pétis de la Croix, French orientalist (b. 1653)
- December 5 – Tokugawa Gorōta, daimyo (b. 1711)
- December 14
  - Feodosia Alekseyevna of Russia, Tsarevna of Russia (b. 1662)
  - Thomas Rymer, English Historiographer royal (b. 1641)
- December 15
  - Frederik Johan van Baer, Dutch army commander (b. 1645)
  - Carlo Maratta, Italian painter (b. 1625)
- December 17 – Nicolò Beregan, Italian noble and singer (b. 1627)
- December 18 – Frederick Henry, Duke of Saxe-Zeitz-Pegau-Neustadt, German Duke (b. 1668)
- December 31 – Edward Proger, Member of Parliament for Brecknockshire (b. 1621)
- date unknown
  - Basil Lazarus III, Syriac Orthodox Maphrian of the East
  - Thomas Ellwood, English religious writer (b. 1639)
