= John Cropley =

John Cropley may refer to:

- Sir John Cropley, 1st Baronet (d. 1676), of the Cropley baronets
- Sir John Cropley, 2nd Baronet (1663–1713), MP for Shaftesbury

== See also ==
- Cropley (disambiguation)
