= Edmund Bowyer (died 1681) =

English politician

Sir Edmund Bowyer (28 October 1613 – 27 January 1681) was an English politician who sat in the House of Commons from 1660 to 1679.

Bowyer was the son of Benjamin Bowyer of Surrey. He succeeded to the estates of his uncle Sir Edmund Bowyer of Camberwell in 1627. He was admitted at Peterhouse, Cambridge on 5 March 1630. He was knighted by Charles I at Dunfermline on 4 July 1633, being then "of Camberwell".

In 1660, Bowyer was elected Member of Parliament for Gatton in the Convention Parliament. He was elected MP for Surrey in 1661 for the Cavalier Parliament.

Bowyer married twice: firstly to Hester Aucher (d. 1665) then secondly to Martha Wilson, widow of Sir Edward Cropley and mother of Sir John Cropley. With Martha, he had two daughters: Frances Bowyer (who died unmarried) and Catharine, who married her maternal cousin, Sir James Ashe.

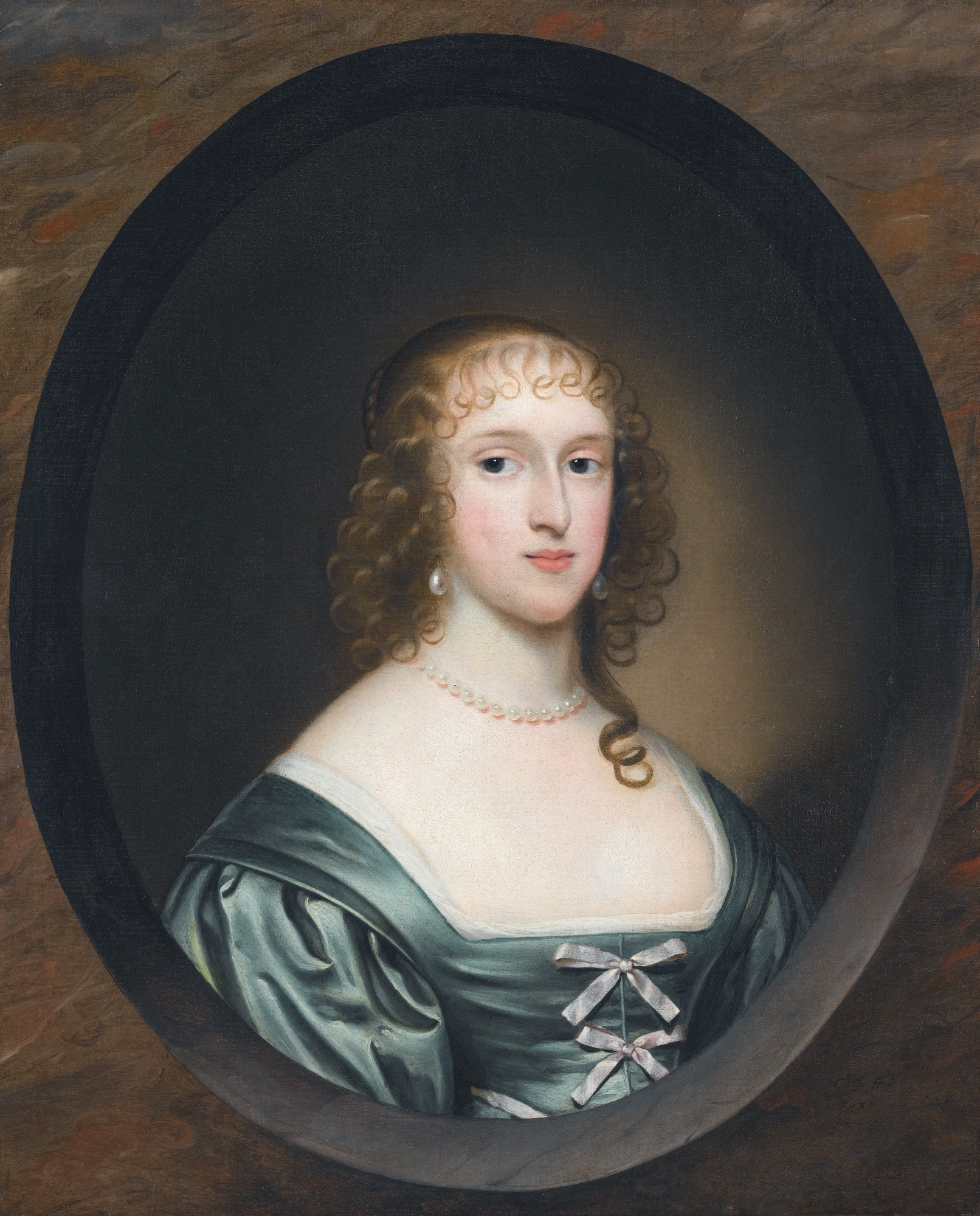
Lady Bowyer, Hester Aucher (Cornelis Jonson van Ceulen, 1636)

Bowyer died at the age of 67 and was commemorated on a monument at Camberwell Church.
