= Cropley =

Cropley may refer to:

- Cropley (surname)
- Cropley (VTA)
- Cropley baronets
- Cropley Lake, alpine lake in Juneau, Alaska, United States
