= Edmund Bowyer =

Edmund Bowyer may refer to:

- Sir Edmund Bowyer (died 1627) (1552–1627), English MP in 1604 and 1624
- Sir Edmund Bowyer (died 1681) (1613–1681), English MP in 1660
