= Cropley (surname) =

Cropley is a surname. Notable people with the surname include:

- Alex Cropley (1951–2026), Scottish footballer
- Charles Elmore Cropley (1894–1952), Clerk of the Supreme Court of the United States
- Jack Cropley (1924–2009), Scottish footballer
- John Cropley (disambiguation), multiple people
- Tyler Cropley (born 1995), American baseball catcher
