= Georg Otho =

German orientalist

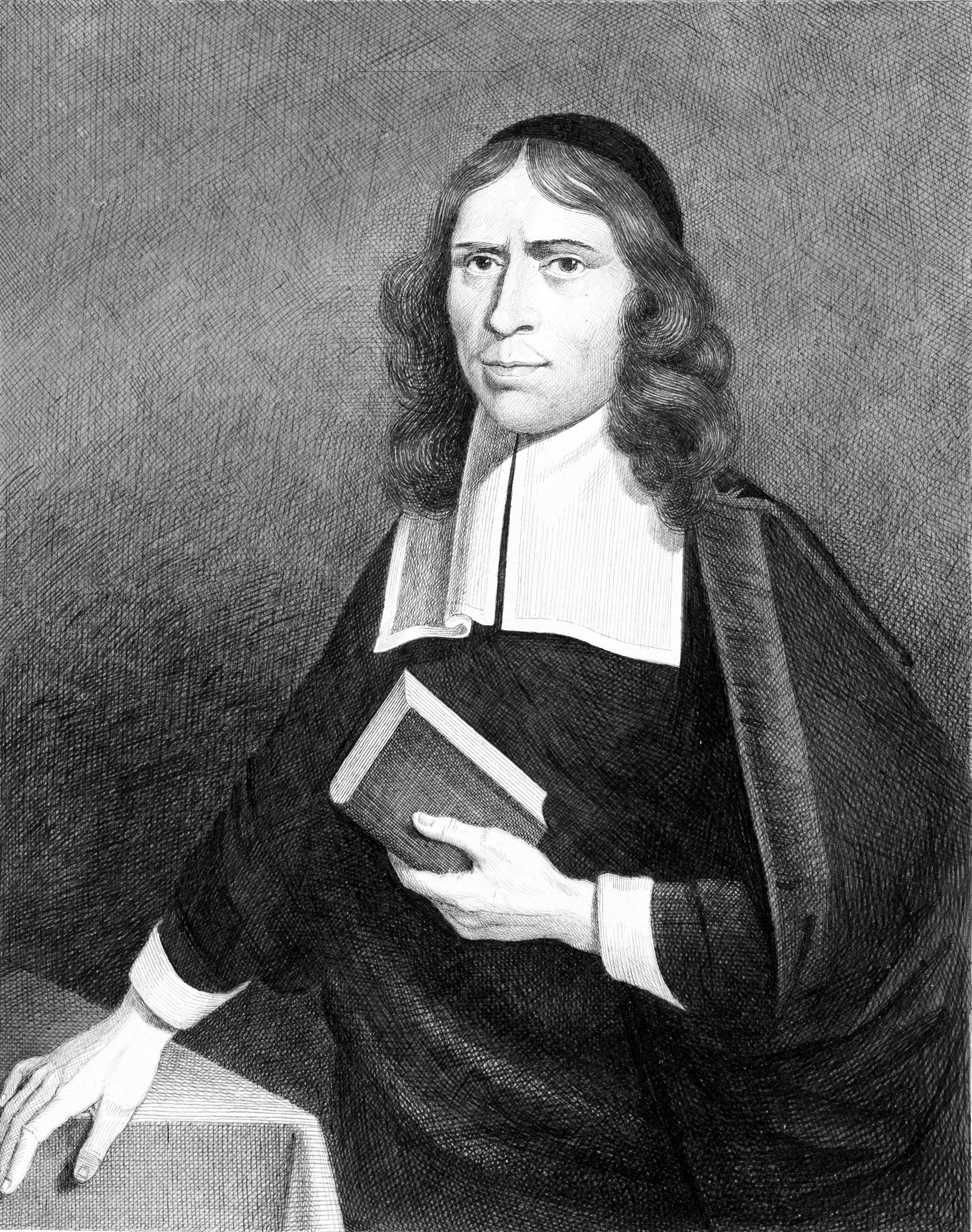
- Born: 25 July 1634; Sattenhausen
- Died: 28 May 1713 (aged 78); Marburg
- Occupation: Orientalist, Librarian, university teacher, writer
- Employer: Marburg University

Georg Otho (25 July 1634 – 28 May 1713) was a German orientalist, who was born at Sattenhausen, near Cassel. He became professor and librarian at the University of Marburg, and died in that city. Besides a large number of academical discourses, and Latin essays on various points of philosophy and of Biblical exegesis, he wrote, Oratio funebris in obitum Justi Jungmannii (Cassel, 1668, 4to): De accentuatione textus Hebraici (Marburg, 1698, 4to): Synopsis institutionum Samaritanarum, Rabbinicarum, Arabicarum, Ethiopicarum, et Persicarum, ex. optimis autoribus excerpta Francf. 1701, 8vo). Otho, in his grammars, adopted the plan and system of James Alting; they were therefore looked upon as a continuation of Alting's works, and reprinted with the latter's grammars in 1717 and 1730: Fundamenta punctuationis linguae sancte, and Institutiones Chald. et Syr.; Palestra linguarum Orientalium (ibid. 1702, 4to), destined to facilitate the comparative study of Oriental languages. It contains the first four chapters of Genesis, in the Hebrew text, accompanied by the Latin version of Arius Montanus, in the Targums of Onkelos, of Jonathan, and of Jerusalem, and the Syriac, Samaritan, Arabic, Ethiopian, and Persian translations, each with a literal Latin translation. It gives also all that part of both the smaller and the larger Masorah which relates to these four chapters, and the notes of R. Solomon, Aben-Ezra, etc. The whole is preceded by a model of parsing in each of these languages, and followed by glossaries for all the words contained in the book: Virga Aharonis polyglottos (Marb. 1692, 4to); a work of the same kind as the preceding, more elaborate, but less extensive; it embraces only the first eleven verses of Numbers 17. A letter of Otho is inserted in Lacroze, Thesaurus epistol, 1:311. See Jocher, Allg. Gel.-Lex., Supplement; Hoefer, Nouv. Biog. Generale, 38:929.
