= Valentin Molitor =

Swiss composer and monk

Valentin Molitor (15 April 1637 in Rapperswil – 4 October 1713 in Weingarten, Württemberg) was a Swiss composer and Benedictine monk. He worked at the monastery of St. Gallen.
