= Francisco Martín Fernández de Posadas =

Blessed Francisco Martín Fernández de Posadas O.P.
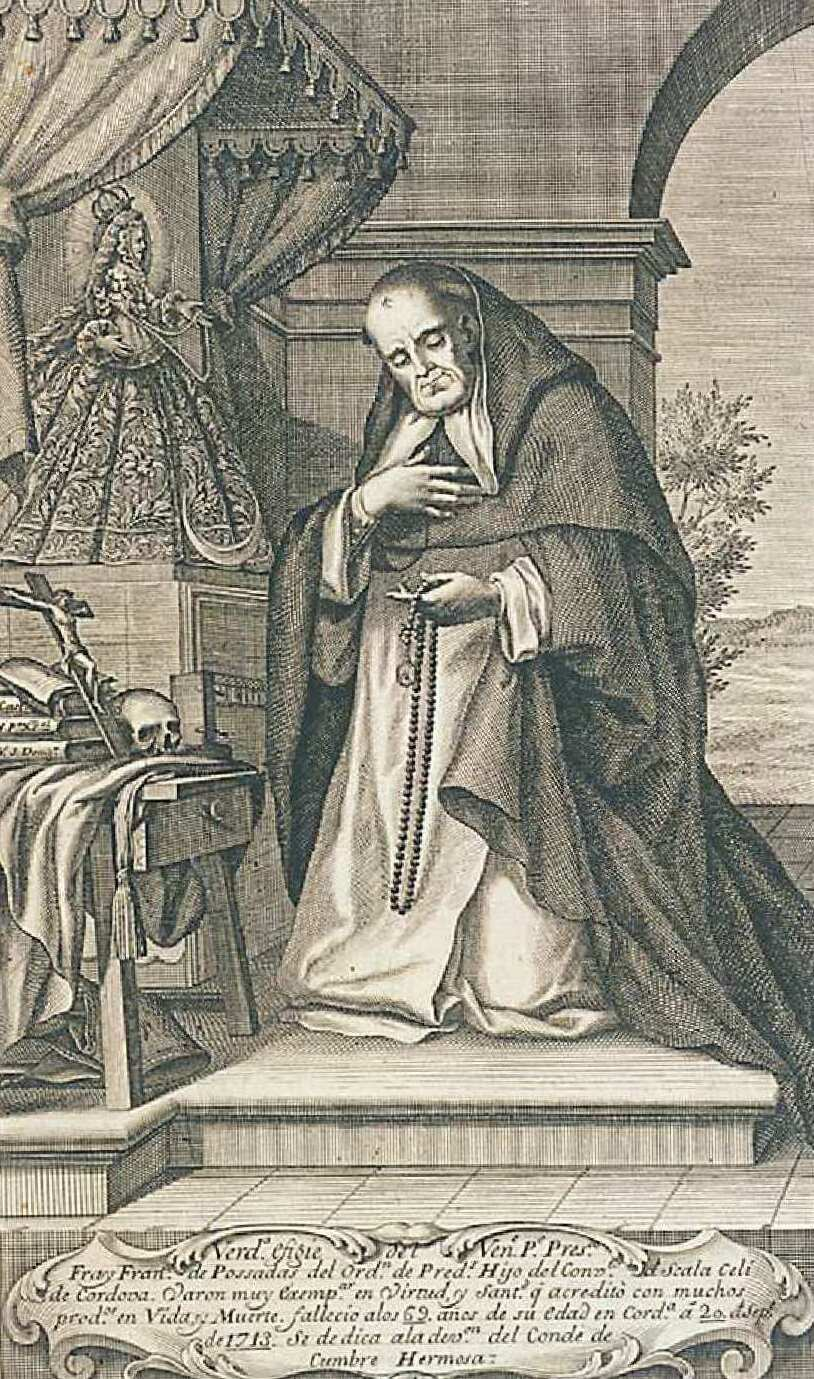

Priest
- Born: 25 November 1644; Córdoba, Habsburg Spain
- Died: 20 September 1713 (aged 68); Córdoba, Kingdom of Spain
- Venerated in: Roman Catholic Church
- Beatified: 20 September 1818, Saint Peter's Basilica, Papal States by Pope Pius VII
- Feast: 20 September
- Attributes: Dominican habit
- Patronage: People ridiculed for their faith; People rejected by religious orders

Francisco Martín Fernández de Posadas (25 November 1644 - 20 September 1713) was a Spanish Roman Catholic priest and a professed member of the Order of Preachers. He became a noted preacher and popular confessor while being hailed as a second Vincent Ferrer and in the beginning was subjected to violent dislike and ridicule from fellow Dominicans before he was allowed to enter the order.

His beatification received ratification from Pope Pius VII on 20 September 1818 after the pontiff confirmed the late priest's local cultus - or popular and enduring devotion.

== Life ==
Francisco Martín Fernández de Posadas was born in the Kingdom of Spain on 25 November 1644 as the son of poor parents, who were war refugees and who belonged to an ancient noble household who had since declined in its status. He received his baptism in late 1644, not long after his birth.

Posadas - while still a mere infant - was found on one occasion to have the name of the Madonna imprinted over his heart and it became the first word that he ever uttered. He recited rosaries on a frequent basis and his mother saw her son's great attraction to the faith in him and desired that her son enter the Order of Preachers. The death of his father came as a blow to the Posadas household and her mother later remarried to a man that held disdain for Posadas and treated him with crudeness. His stepfather insisted that the child stop his studies and be put to learn a useful trade as an apprentice. He did so out of obedience but never abandoned what he believed to be his true calling. He managed to obtain leave from his master and continued with his studies. Before she remarried his mother tried several different jobs and soon settled on selling eggs and vegetables at a street stand. Posadas's mother also encouraged her son to go to the Dominican-run church of Saint Paul where he would attend Mass from the age of six each morning.

He commenced his novitiate in 1663, in the Dominican convent of Scala Coeli but was treated with harshness and contempt which he endured with remarkable patience; his novitiate ended in 1664. The Dominicans at first did not want him in the order because he was the poor son of a street peddler and even when the Scala Coeli fathers offered to take him and train him in Latin the vindictive dislike on the part of the prior almost prevented this from happening. His detractors within the order soon realized his holiness and patience and in a unanimous decision, he decided to admit him into the priesthood.

The now-ordained Posadas sought to imitate Vincent Ferrer whom he chose as his special patron. He loved to administer to the ill and the imprisoned and refused all positions of leadership in the order - which he dreaded - while also turning down two bishoprics that were offered to him at different points. He was also said to have levitated on some occasions. The priest also published several works which included a biographical account of the life and works of Dominic of Osme.

Posadas prepared in the confessional on 20 September 1713, when he died. His remains are housed in the Dominican church of Saint Paul.

== Beatification ==
The ratification of his local 'cultus' - or a popular devotion - allowed for Pope Pius VII to issue a decree that confirmed the late priest's beatification on 20 September 1818.
