= Anna Maria Elvia =

Swedish author (1713–1784)

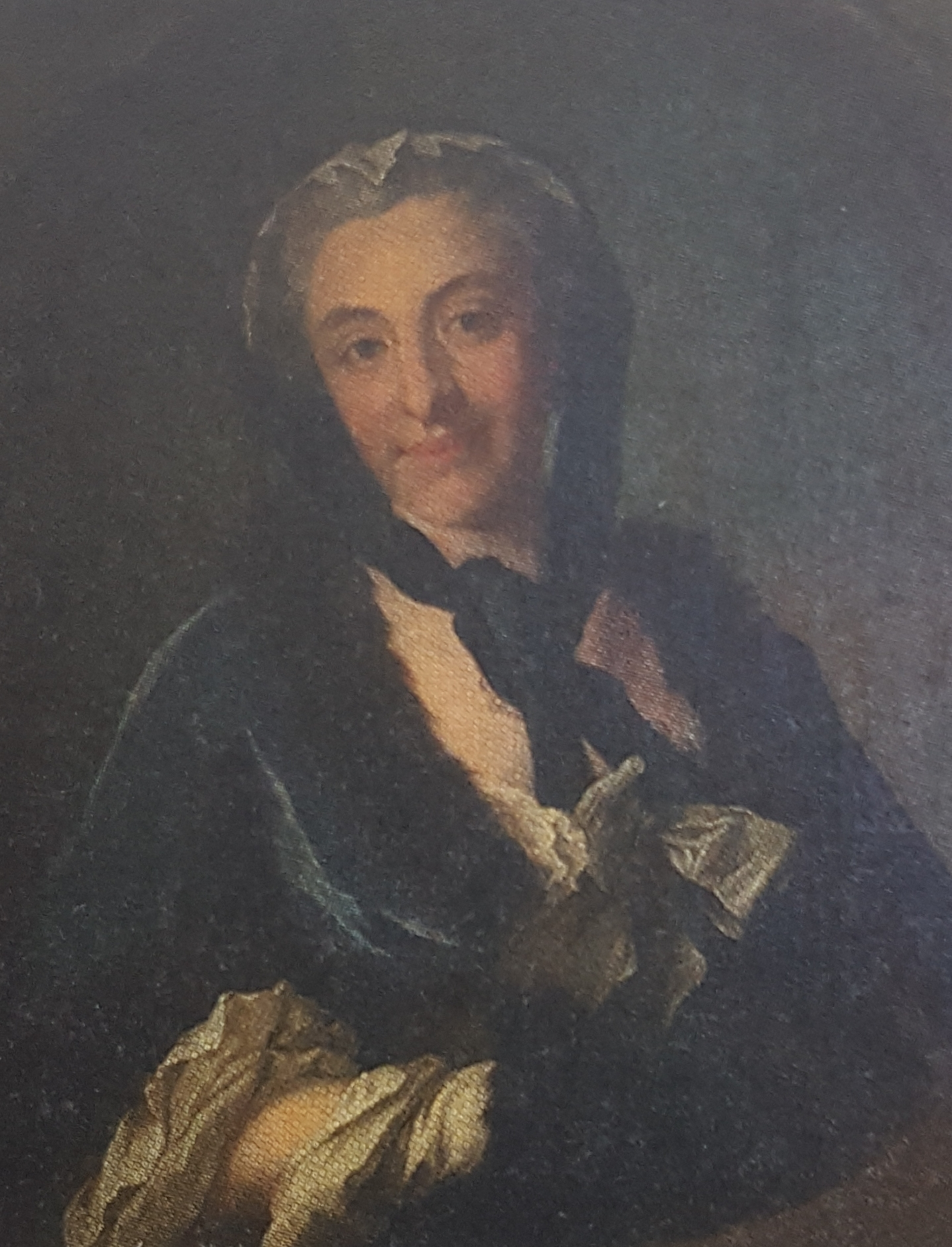
Anna Maria Elvia

Anna Maria Elvia (20 February 1713 - 8 May 1784), was a Swedish feminist writer.

== Biography ==
She was the daughter of a professor, Petrus Elvius, the sister of the mathematician Per Elvius the Younger and married professor Mårten Strömer in 1757, all active in the Uppsala University. She belonged to the academical world in Uppsala and was given an unusually high education for a contemporary female, such as mathematics, astronomy and several languages including Latin.

She was renowned and respected for her academic abilities. Jonas Lindeblad said of her in 1770, that she was known for her intellectual resources, despite her effort to remain discreet, simply because they could not be hidden.

Elvia regarded intellectual development as not only a right but a duty for a female. This was a controversial idea of her time and she was alongside Hedvig Charlotta Nordenflycht one of few female contemporary writers to express it. She is quoted: "Our sex should make a habit of thus: to learn and to think." (1750).

== Works ==
1. Fägnerim, Då Herr Prosten Kolmodin sin Bibliska Qwino-Spegels Andra Del af Trycket utgaf, i Olof Kolmodin, Biblisk Qwinno-Spegel, 2, Stockholm, 1750
2. Eva Maria Anckarcrona, g. Ferber, begravningsdikt, 4:o, 1760.
