= Antoine-Noé de Polier de Bottens =

Swiss theologian (1713–1783)

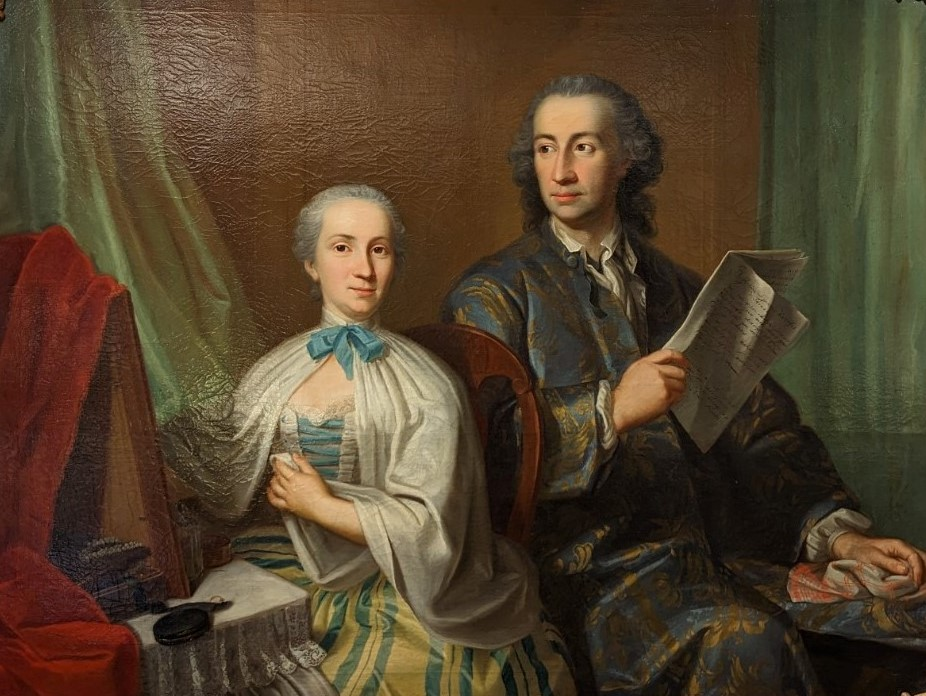
- Portrait of Polier and his first wife, 1750
- Born: 14 December 1713; Lausanne, Switzerland
- Died: 9 August 1783 (aged 69); Lausanne, Switzerland
- Spouse: Elisabeth Antoinette Suzanne Lagier de Pluviannes (m. 1744; died 1769) Angélique de La Fléchère (m. 1770).

Antoine-Noé Polier de Bottens (14 December 1713 – 9 August 1783) was an 18th-century Swiss Protestant theologian and pastor.

== Biography ==
Coat of arms of the Polier family

Antoine-Noé Polier de Bottens descended from a noble Huguenot family from the French Rouergue that had left for Switzerland in the 16th century to escape persecution and not have to abjure their Protestant faith. The first known member of this family was Jean Polier, who died in 1602 after being Secretary of the Embassy of France in Geneva, a family which included scholars, professors and officers who served with distinction in the armies of most major powers. Polier was the son of Jean Jacques Polier de Bottens (1670–1747), knight banneret of Lausanne, and his wife Salomée Jeanne Elisabeth Quisard (ca. 1670–1735).

Polier first began to study theology at the Academy of Lausanne then, in order to complete his studies, moved to the Leiden University, where he obtained a doctorate in 1739. Back in his home country, Polier took over a parish in the city of Lausanne. From 1743 he was third, 1754 second, and 1765 first pastor in Lausanne. In 1759, Polier became president of the French seminary of Lausanne, and then in 1766 advanced as dean of the chapter.

Through an extensive correspondence with Voltaire during the period 1753–1759, he was encouraged by the famous thinker to have his writings published by Marc-Michel Bousquet's (1696–1762) publishing company.

In the realm of his competences, Polier wrote at least nine but unauthorized articles for the Encyclopédie by Diderot and d'Alembert: Kijovn, Liturgie, Logomachie, Magicien, Magie, Malachbelus, Mânes, Maosim and Messie. Voltaire adopted these articles for his Dictionnaire philosophique (1764), but modified extensively passages when they put in question beliefs on a literal interpretation of Scriptures.

On 13 April 1744, Polier married Elisabeth Antoinette Suzanne Lagier de Pluviannes (1722–1769). Together they had five daughters and four sons. After his wife's death, Polier married Angélique de La Fléchère in 1770.

== Works (selection) ==
- La Sainte Ecriture de l'Ancien Testament. 6 vol. (1764–1766)
- Dissertatio philologica qua disquiritur de puritate dialecti arabicae, comparate cum puritate dialecti hebraeae in relatione ad antediluvianam linguam, quam sub praesidio D. Alberti Schultens. Lugduni in Batavis: apud J. Luzac, (1739)

== Sources ==
- Pierre Larousse, Grand Dictionnaire universel du XIXe, vol. 12, Paris, Administration du grand Dictionnaire universel, 1866.

== Bibliography ==
- F.-A. Forel (Hrsg.): Les souvenirs de jeunesse d'Antoine de Polier de Bottens. In RHV, (1911) pp. 117–128, 142–148, 171–181, 237–249
- Raymond Naves: Voltaire et l´Encyclopédie. Paris (1938) pp. 23–33; 43; 141–148; 185–194
