= Jacob van Oost the Younger =

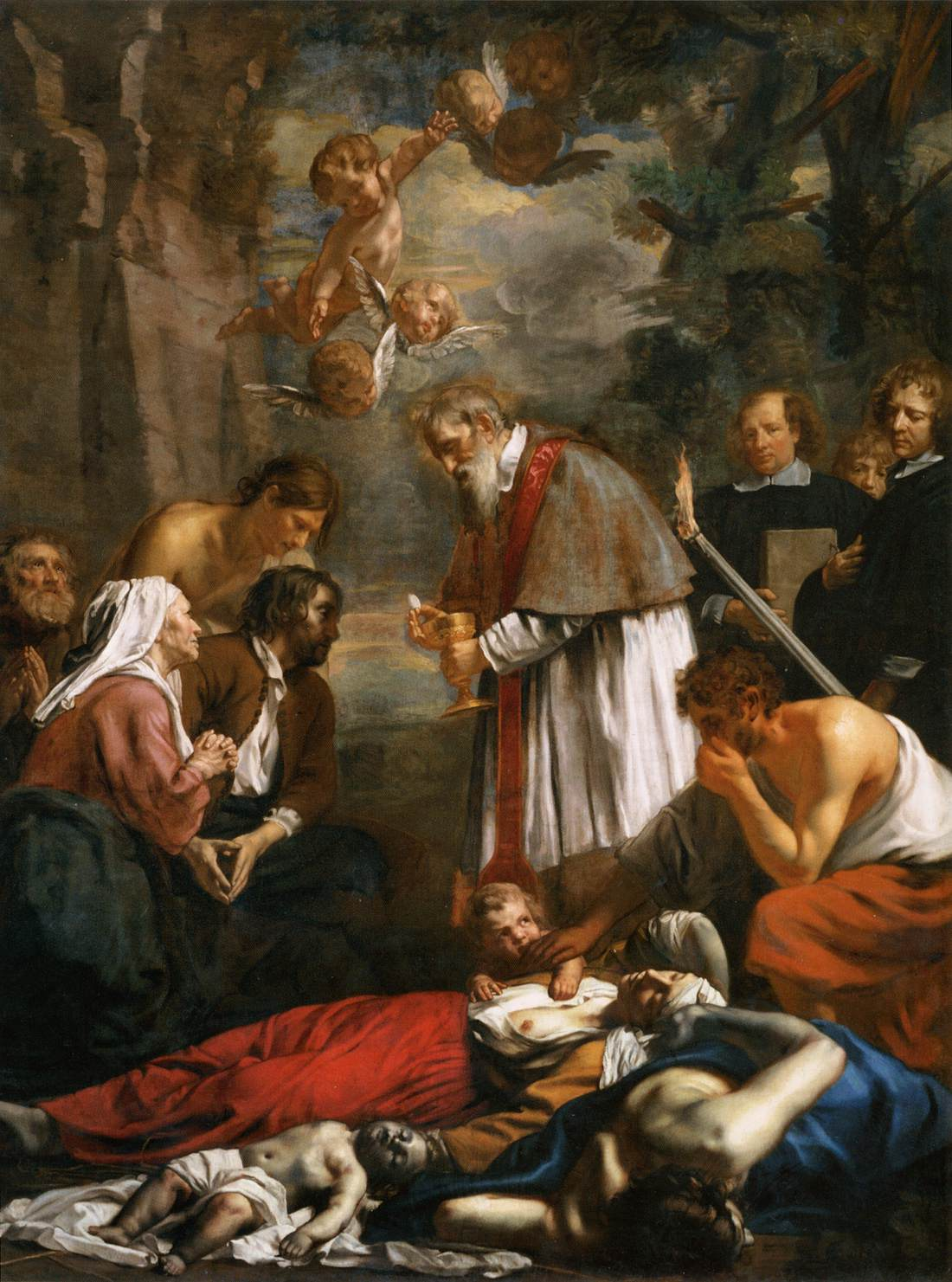
St Macarius of Ghent Giving Aid to the Plague Victims, 1676

Jacob van Oost the Younger (1639–1713 in Bruges), was a Flemish Baroque painter.

According to the Rijksbureau voor Kunsthistorische Documentatie, he was a pupil of his father Jacob sr. and brother to the painter Willem van Oost. He is known for portraits and genre works.
