= August de la Motte =

Hanoverian Army officer

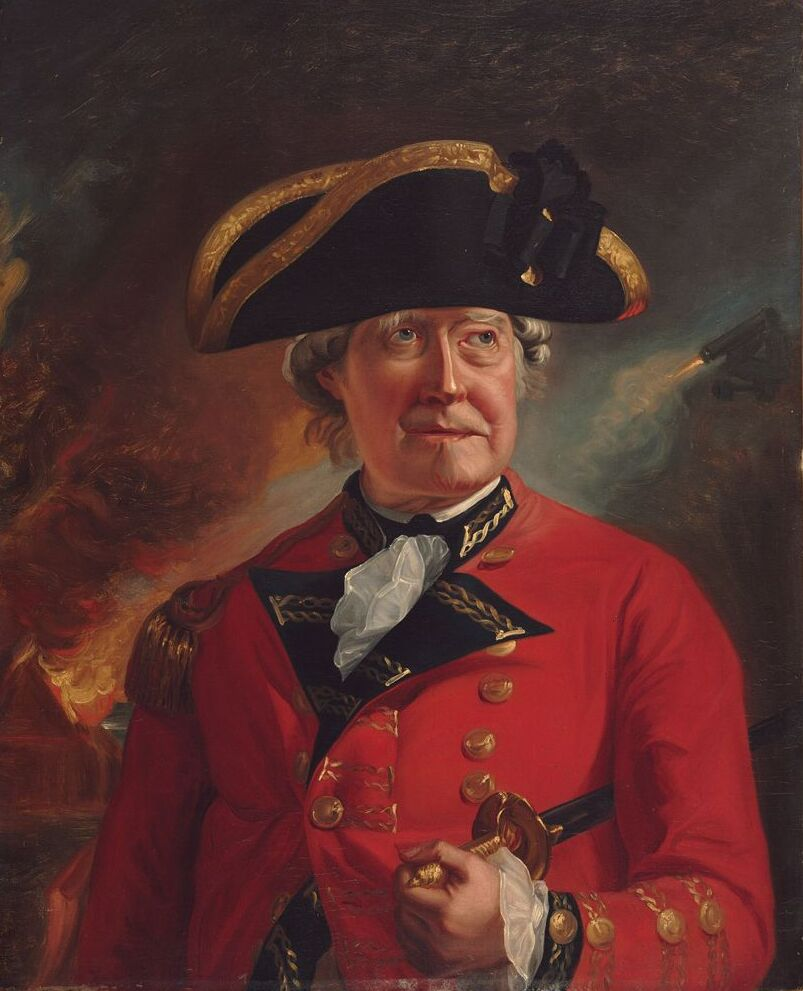
- Portrait by John Singleton Copley, 1787
- Born: 17 November 1713
- Died: 29 August 1788 (aged 74)
- Allegiance: Electorate of Hanover
- Branch: Hanoverian Army
- Rank: Lieutenant general
- Conflicts: Seven Years' War; Siege of Cassel (1762); Anglo-Spanish War (1779–1783); Great Siege of Gibraltar

Lieutenant-General August de la Motte (17 November 1713 – 29 August 1788) was a Hanoverian Army officer who served in the Seven Years' War and Anglo-Spanish War.

== Life ==
De la Motte was born on 17 November 1713 in the Principality of Brunswick-Wolfenbüttel. He served in the Hanoverian Army during the Seven Years' War, notably participating in the Second Siege of Cassel. In 1775 the Duke and Prince-elector of Hanover was George III, who also ruled the Kingdom of Great Britain in personal union. King George had to deal with the American Revolution and the outbreaking American Revolutionary War and prepared to ready Hanoverian troops for garrison duty so that British troops would be freed for service in America.

On 16 October de la Motte, by now a colonel, was given command of a Hanoverian brigade and sent to Gibraltar for garrison duty. His unit totalled three battalions with 15 companies of infantry and three companies of Grenadiers. In the next year he was promoted to major general. During the Great Siege of Gibraltar, de la Motte served as third-in-command of the British garrison. They held out for three years and seven months before the siege was finally lifted. De la Motte, who had been promoted to lieutenant general in 1781 while still being besieged, was highly praised by his commanding officer afterwards. To commemorate their bravery Motte's troops were awarded the battle honour "Gibraltar", a cuff title which their successor formations in the Imperial German Army would eventually wear during World War I.

Returning home from Gibraltar to Hanover in 1784 the exhausted de la Motte retired, dying four years later on 29 August 1788.
