= Ivan Andreyevich Tolstoy =

Russian officer (1644–1713)

Ivan Andreevich Tolstoy (Russian: Иван Андреевич Толстой) (1644–1713) was a Russian officer in the army of Tsar Peter I.

Ivan Andreevich was a member of prominent Tolstoy family, son of Andrey Vasiliyevich Tolstoy and Solomonida Miloslavskaya, older brother of Pyotr Andreyevich Tolstoy, distant relation of Maria Miloslavskaya (first wife of tzar Aleksey Mikhailovich).

The royal relations became very dangerous for brothers Tolstoys after Peter I took the power, as he hated his half-sister Sophia and distrusted all her Miloslavsky relatives. Despite this Peter respected the abilities of the Tolstoy brothers and allowed them to follow a military career: Ah head, head, were you not so clever I should have cut it off long ago - he actually said to Pyotr Tolstoy.

In 1703 Ivan Tolstoy was appointed Governor of Azov - the fortress and naval base on the Black Sea that was critically important in the confrontation between Russia and Turkey, bands of Don Cossacks and Kondraty Bulavin uprising. In 1708 Bulavin's forces accompanied by Turks and cossacks stormed Azov, but Tolstoy's troops were victorious and not only kept the fortress but according to historian Nikolay Tolstoy captured and hanged Bulavin himself. (According to other sources, Bulavin was killed by a renegade among his own cossacks). Ivan Tolstoy also marched his troops to take part in the Battle of Poltava in 1709.

In 1710 Ivan was replaced as a Governor of Azov by Admiral Apraxin. In 1712 after the disastrous Pruth Campaign, Azov was surrendered to Turkey. As a condition of peace, Turkey requested that the governor Ivan Tolstoy personally moved to Azov and surrendered the fortress to Turkey representative Achmed Pascha. Despite concerns that he might share the fate of his diplomat brother Pyotr Andreyevich Tolstoy, who was at that time thrown into Turkey's notorious prison Seven Towers, Ivan travelled to Azov and on the way back became ill and died in Cherkassk on 25 August 1713.

== Sources ==
- Nikolay Tolstoy, The Tostoys: twenty-four generations of Russian History, London,1983, ISBN 0-241-10979-5
