= William Harrison (poet) =

English poet and diplomat

- Citizenship: British
- Occupations: Poet and Diplomat

William Harrison (1685–1713) was an English poet and diplomat.

== Life ==
He was admitted scholar of Winchester College in 1698, coming from the neighbouring parish of St. Cross, aged 13. In 1704, he was elected to a scholarship at New College, Oxford, and after two years of probation succeeded to a fellowship in 1706. Joseph Addison became his friend, and obtained for him the post of governor to a son of the Duke of Queensberry at a salary of £40 a year. With this and his fellowship, which he retained for his life, Harrison plunged into London society.

Harrison was recommended by Addison to Jonathan Swift, who took to him, by 1710. When Richard Steele discontinued The Tatler, a continuation by Harrison suggested itself to Henry St. John and Swift, who was however dubious. The first number came out 13 January 1711; it ran in all to 52 numbers, twice a week, to 19 May 1711. Between these dates, Swift introduced Harrison to St. John, who obtained for him the post of secretary to Lord Raby, the ambassador extraordinary at The Hague to arrange the treaty with France. St. John gave him fifty guineas for the expenses of his journey, and on 20 April 1711 he set off for Holland. In time, but after some trouble with the previous holder of the office, he became queen's secretary to the embassy at Utrecht, and in January 1713 returned to England with the barrier treaty.

It turned out that Harrison had no ready money; and he was attacked by fever and inflammation on his lungs. Swift got thirty guineas for him, with an order on the treasury for £100, and removed him to Knightsbridge. On 14 February 1713 Swift went to call on him; Harrison had died an hour before, with Edward Young.

== Works ==
Harrison's major poem was Woodstock Park (1706); It was printed in Robert Dodsley's Collection. The third ode of Horace, imitated by him as To the Yacht which carried the Duke of Marlborough to Holland, 1707, is included in William Duncombe's Horace, and several of his poetical pieces are inserted in Steele's Poetical Miscellanies, 1714. Most of his poems, except Woodstock Park, were reprinted in John Nichols's Collection.

The Tatler which he edited in 1711 was reprinted in duodecimo in 1712 and subsequent years as Steele's Tatler, vol. v. Some of the essays are reprinted in Nichols's edition of the Tatler, vol. vi. A long letter written by Harrison from Utrecht to Swift on 16 December 1712 is in the latter's works, 1883 ed., xvi. 14–18.
