= Giuseppe Maria Buondelmonti =

Italian poet, orator and philosopher

Giuseppe Maria Buondelmonti (13 September 1713 - 7 February 1757) was an Italian poet, orator and philosopher.

== Biography ==
Buondelmonti was born into a noble family, and was raised highly educated. He attended the University of Pisa, but was unable to graduate due to health issues. During this time he did write poetry, literary critiques, entries for an encyclopedia that was being put together, and a number of funeral orations. While in his 20s he joined the Freemasons, a decision which would have exposed him to serious danger, but he had the protection of his noble family's political connections to protect him. He was also involved in the church, where he was granted the rank Knight Commander of the Order of Malta. This degree admitted him into the clerical hierarchy, where he could be called "Fra Giuseppe Maria" and would attend mass every day.

In 1751, Buondelmonti was elected to the Accademia della Crusca. Over the next 5 years he wrote a number of works on philosophy, specifically the principles of natural law. Sickly throughout its life, Buondelmonti died on 7 February 1757 in Pisa. He was buried in the church of San Michele in Borgo, where there is an inscription in his memory.

== Sources ==
- Academy of academics funeral poems for the death of the Ill. Mr. mo. cav. G. B., Pisa 1757
- Novelle literary Florence, XVIII (1757), et al. 146-51
- Mazzuchelli, Giammaria (1763). "BUONDELMONTI (Giuseppe Maria)". Gli scrittori d'Italia, cioè Notizie storiche e critiche intorno alle vite e agli scritti dei letterati italiani (in Italian). Vol. II, part 4. Brescia: Giambatista Bossini. pp. 2375–2378.
- D. Moreni, Bibl. historical and rational in Tuscany, I, Florence 1805
- A. Vannucci, G.M.B., in E. De Tipaldo, Biography of famous Italians, V, Venice, 1837, p. 486-91
- P. Berselli Ambri, Montesquieu's work in the eighteenth century Italian, Florence 1960, p. 5, 94 s., 103
- E. W. Cochrane, Tradition and Enlightenment in the Tuscan Academies .1690 to 1800, Rome 1961, p. 207, 214, 225
- M. Rosa, Despotism and liberty in the eighteenth century, Bari 1964, p. 11-13.
- Diaz, Furio (1972). "BUONDELMONTI, Giuseppe Maria". Dizionario Biografico degli Italiani (in Italian). Vol. 15. Rome: Istituto dell'Enciclopedia Italiana.
