= Lebbeus Harris =

Canadian politician

Lebbeus Harris (August 11, 1713 – 1792) was a judge and political figure in Nova Scotia. He represented the township of Horton in the Nova Scotia House of Assembly from 1761 to 1765.

He was born in Montville, Connecticut, the son of James Harris and Sarah Rogers. In 1738, he married Alice Ransom. He received a land grant in Nova Scotia and settled at Horton. He was named a justice of the peace in 1768. In 1783, he was named a judge in the Inferior Court of Common Pleas for King's County. Harris also served as major in the local militia.
