= Sir John Cropley, 2nd Baronet =

English Whig politician

Sir John Cropley, 2nd Baronet (15 July 1663 – 22 October 1713), of Red Lion Square, was an English Whig politician who sat in the English and British House of Commons from 1701 to 1710.

== Early life ==
Cropley was baptised at St. James Clerkenwell, Middlesex, on 23 July 1663, the only son of Sir Edward Cropley of Clerkenwell and his wife Martha née Wilson, daughter of Robert Wilson, a London merchant. He succeeded his father in 1665 and succeeded to the baronetcy on the death of his grandfather in November 1676. He studied at Clare College, Cambridge in 1678. He travelled abroad in Italy, France, and Germany from 1686 to 1689 with Anthony Ashley-Cooper who became a firm friend.

== Career ==
Cropley was returned unopposed as Whig Member of Parliament (MP) for Shaftesbury with the support of Ashley at the second general election of 1701. He was returned unopposed again at the 1702 English general election. He did not vote for the Tack, and told against the occasional conformity bill. At the 1705 English general election he was returned again unopposed as Whig MP for Shaftesbury, and voted for the Court candidate for Speaker on 25 October 1705. He started to pursue an independent Whig line and occasionally opposed the Whig Junto. Although he sought no post for himself he was involved in attempts by Ashley to obtain a place for his relative Thomas Micklethwayte. He was returned unopposed again as a Whig at the 1708 British general election and fell in line with the Whig policies. In 1709, he voted for the naturalization of the Palatines, and in 1710 for the impeachment of Dr Sacheverell. However he was defeated at the 1710 British general election in the light of public support for Sacheverell.

Since Lord Shaftesbury had moved abroad because of ill-health, Cropley became a guardian of his friend's child and estate for the next three years. He did not stand for Parliament again and died unmarried on 22 October 1713. He left an estate worth about £4,000 p.a. to Thomas Micklethwayte, and the baronetcy became extinct.

Parliament of England
Preceded by Thomas Chafin; Edward Nicholas	Member of Parliament for Shaftesbury; 1701 –1707; With: Edward Nicholas	Succeeded by Parliament of Great Britain
Parliament of Great Britain
Preceded by Parliament of England	Member of Parliament for Shaftesbury; 1707–1710; With: Edward Nicholas	Succeeded by Edward Seymour; Edward Nicholas
Baronetage of England
Preceded by John Cropley	Baronet (of Clerkenwell); 1676-1713	Extinct
