= Cropley baronets =

Extinct baronetcy in the Baronetage of England

The Cropley Baronetcy, of Clerkenwell in the County of Middlesex, was a title in the Baronetage of England. It was created on 7 May 1661 for John Cropley. The second Baronet sat as Member of Parliament for Shaftesbury. The title became extinct on his death in 1713.

== Cropley baronets, of Clerkenwell (1661) ==
- Sir John Cropley, 1st Baronet (died 1676)
- Sir John Cropley, 2nd Baronet (1663–1713)
