= Hannibal Vyvyan (born c. 1598) =

English politician and Member of Parliament

Hannibal Vyvyan (baptised 11 July 1598 – by 22 April 1657) was an English politician and member of parliament (MP). His surname is sometimes spelt Vivian.

Vyvyan was born in 1598 and baptised on 11 July 1598, the fourth son of Hannibal Vyvyan, also an MP, of Trelowarren, Cornwall, and his wife Philippe, daughter of Roger Tremayne of Collacombe, Devon. Hannibal matriculated at Exeter College, Oxford in 1605 and graduated BA in 1609. He married Anne Munday, daughter of Richard Munday of St Columb Minor, Cornwall, on 1 March 1622. The couple had five sons and a daughter together before Anne's death. She was buried on 3 January 1636.

The Vyvyan family were prominent in local politics, with Hannibal's father and his older brothers Michael and Francis sitting in Parliament for Cornish constituencies. Francis Vyvyan became captain of St Mawes Castle, and arranged for the post to pass to Hannibal in July 1620. Hannibal also purchased the post of comptroller of Tin Coinage for the Cornish stannaries, and settled in Lostwithiel, becoming a member of the borough's corporation and keeper of Lostwithiel gaol.

While keeper of Lostwithiel gaol Vyvyan became involved in a feud with John Mohun, vice-warden of the Stannaries. He sought to be returned for Parliament using the influence of his brother Francis, in order to avail himself of Parliamentary privilege. He was duly returned as the representative for St Mawes in the Parliament of 1628. Whilst in Parliament he sided with Mohun's enemies, Sir John Eliot and William Coryton, in calling for investigations into Mohun's conduct. Vyvyan also sat on a few committees, but otherwise made little impact on parliament before its dissolution in 1629. Thereafter King Charles ruled for the next eleven years without parliament.

Vyvyan was mayor of Lostwithiel in 1632–33, 1636–1638 and 1640–41. He supported Parliament during the English Civil War and was probably present at the Battle of Lostwithiel in mid-1644 with the Earl of Essex's army. He held the post of comptroller of tin coinage until the abolition of the coinage in 1650, and by 1653 had settled in Plymouth. He died sometime between then and 22 April 1657.

== Notes ==
Parliament of England
Preceded by Sir Henry Carey; William Carr	Member of Parliament for St Mawes; 1628–1629; With: Thomas Carey	Parliament suspended until 1640
