= Tredenham =

Tredenham is a surname. Notable people worth the surname include:

- John Tredenham (1668–1710), English politician
- Joseph Tredenham (c. 1641–1707) English politician
- William Tredenham (c. 1638–1662), English politician
