= Henry Seymour Portman =

English politician

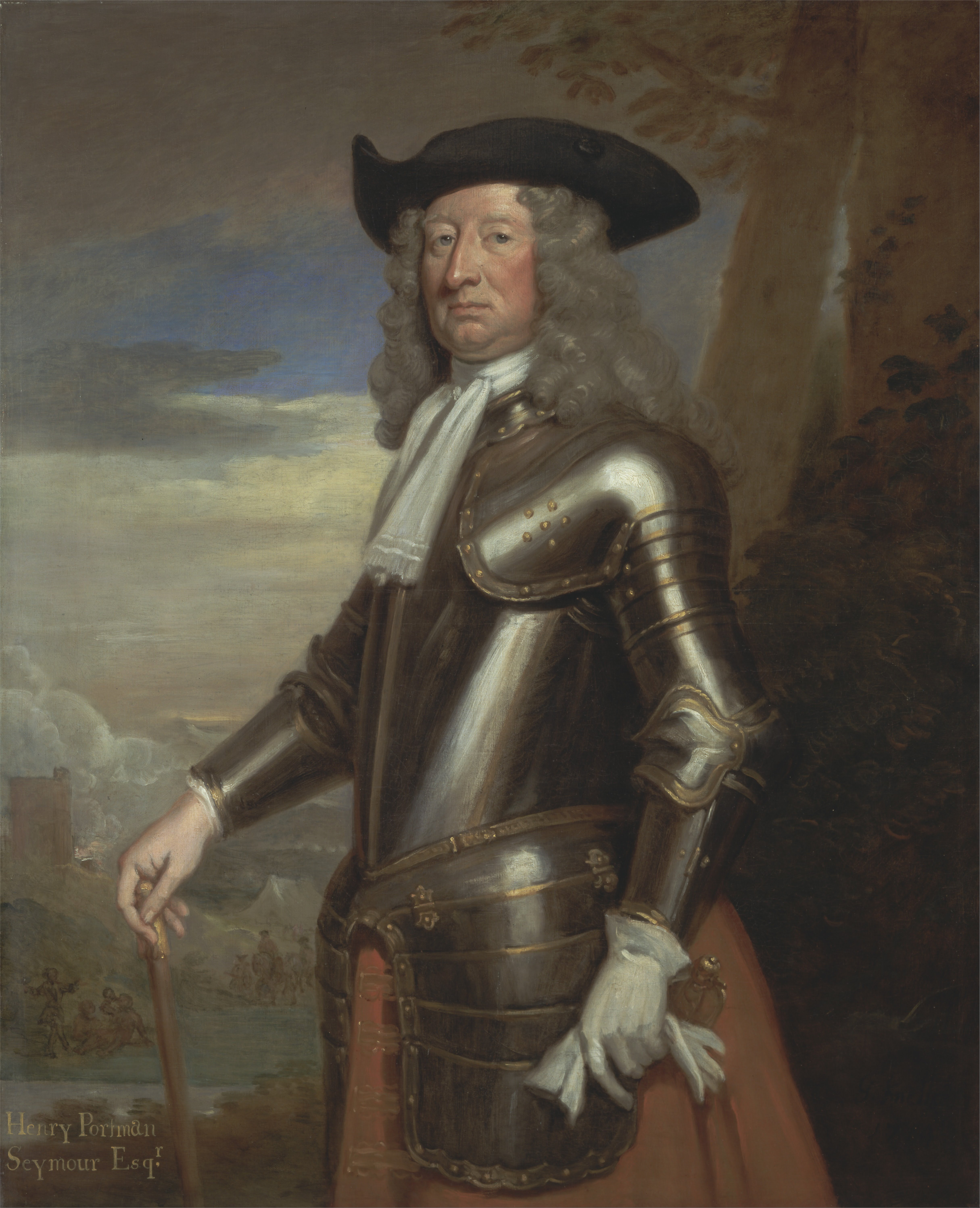
Portrait of Henry Seymour Portman painted by Godfrey Kneller.

Henry Seymour later Portman (c. 1637–1728), of Orchard Portman, Somerset, was an English politician who sat in the House of Commons of England and then Great Britain almost continually between 1679 and 1715.

== Early life ==
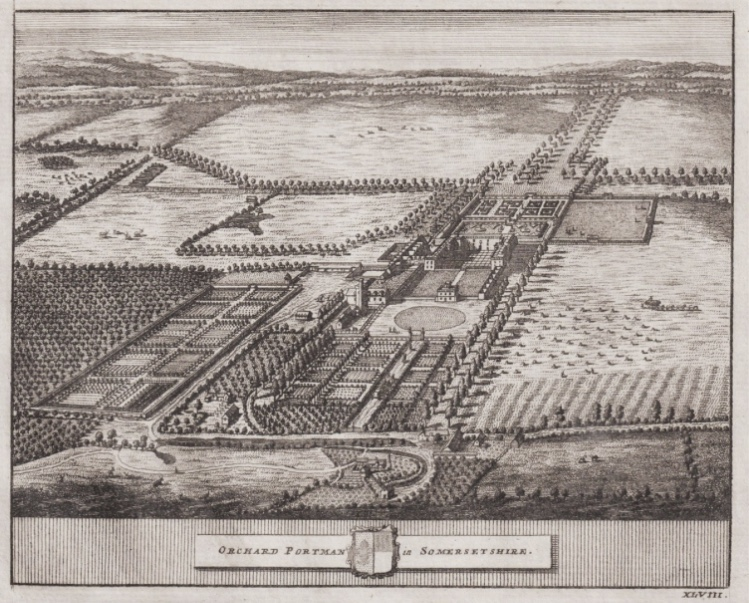
Orchard Portman, Somerset - seat of the Portman family

Seymour was the fifth son of Sir Edward Seymour, 3rd Baronet. He joined the Army and was an ensign in the garrison at Guernsey by 1662, a lieutenant of foot in 1669 and captain in the Duke of Buckingham's Foot from 1672 to 1673. He married as his first wife Penelope Haslewood, daughter of Sir William Haslewood of Maidwell, Northamptonshire.

== Political career ==
Seymour was returned unopposed as Member (MP) for St Mawes in March 1679 and was returned again in elections in October 1679, 1681, 1685 and 1689. He was commissioner for assessment for Dorset from 1689 to 1690. In 1690 he inherited the estates in Somerset and Dorset of his cousin Sir William Portman and assumed the surname of Portman.

(Seymour) Portman was returned unopposed as MP for Totnes at the 1690 general election, but did not stand there in 1695. He was deputy lieutenant of Somerset from 1691 and Somerset and Dorset from 1702, and was also JP for Somerset and Devon. He was returned unopposed as MP for St Mawes in a by-election on 21 November 1696. He was elected MP for Taunton at the 1698 general election and again in January 1701. In February 1702 he was returned unopposed as MP for Wells and held the seat for three more elections until 1708. In 1703 he was appointed keeper for Hyde Park a position he held until his death. At the 1708 general election he was returned unopposed as MP for Somerset. He was elected MP for Taunton again at the 1710 general election, was returned unopposed in 1713 but was unseated on petition after the 1715 general election and never regained his seat.

== Later life and legacy ==
Portman made a second marriage at the age of 77 to Meliora Fitch, daughter of John Fitch, Grocer of London and Lower Henbury, Dorset on 31 July 1714. He died without issue from either marriage on 23 February 1728, said to be aged 93. His estates passed under the entail via his brother Edward Seymour to the descendants of his cousin Edward Berkeley.

Parliament of England
Preceded by Joseph Tredenham; Arthur Spry	Member of Parliament for St Mawes; 1679–1690; With: Sidney Godolphin 1679; Sir Joseph Tredenham 16790-1685; Sir Peter Prideaux 1685-1689; Sir Joseph Tredenham 1689-1690	Succeeded by Sir Joseph Tredenham; John Tredenham
Preceded by Rawlin Mallock; Sir John Fowell, Bt	Member of Parliament for Totnes; 1690–1695; With: Sir John Fowell, Bt 1690-1692; Thomas Coulson 1692-1695	Succeeded by Sir Edward Seymour, 4th Baronet; Edward Yarde
Preceded by Seymour Tredenham; John Tredenham	Member of Parliament for St Mawes; 1696–1698; With: John Tredenham	Succeeded by Sir Joseph Tredenham; John Tredenham
Preceded by John Speke; Edward Clarke	Member of Parliament for Taunton; 1698–1700; With: Edward Clarke	Succeeded by Sir Francis Warre; Edward Clarke
Preceded by Edward Berkeley; William Coward	Member of Parliament for Wells; 1701–1708; With: William Coward 1701-1705; Maurice Berkeley 1705-1708	Succeeded by Edward Colston; William Coward
Parliament of Great Britain
Preceded by John Pigott; Nathaniel Palmer	Member of Parliament for Somerset; 1708–1710; With: John Prowse; Sir William Wyndham, Bt	Succeeded by Sir Thomas Wroth; Sir William Wyndham, Bt
Preceded by Sir Francis Warre; Edward Clarke	Member of Parliament for Taunton; 1710–1715; With: Sir Francis Warre	Succeeded by William Pynsent; James Smith
