= Vyvyan family =

Prominent Cornish family

For the Vivian family of Glynn and Truro, Cornwall, see Baron Vivian.

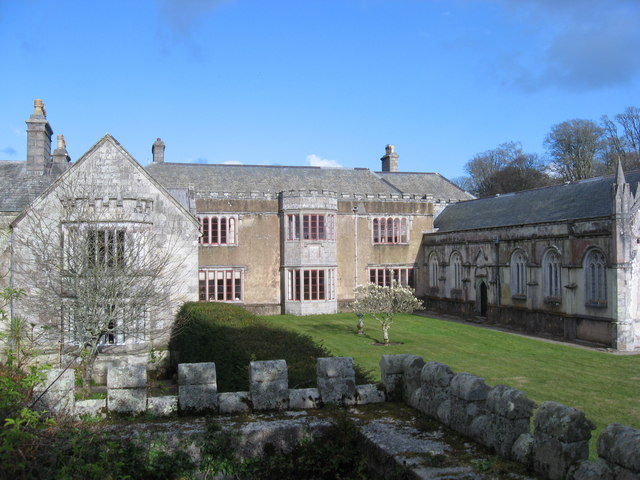
Trelowarren manor house is the seat of the Vyvyan family; life here was described by C. C. Vyvyan in her book The Helford River.

The Vyvyans /ˈvɪviən/ comprise a prominent Cornish family who were members of Parliament, baronets, and landowners in Penwith and Kerrier since the 15th century. The Vyvyan family has held the large Trelowarren Estate in the parish of Mawgan-in-Meneage in west Cornwall for nearly 600 years. They moved to Trelowarren in 1427 from Trevedran, St. Buryan when they acquired Trelowarren through marriage to the daughter of Honora Ferrers, heiress to the estate of the previous owner, Richard Ferrers. Trelowarren's first garden (at least under the Vyvyans) is recorded in 1428. In the English Civil War (1642–1651) the Vyvyans were royalist supporters. Sir Richard Vyvyan (c.1613–1665), 1st Baronet, was given a large equestrian portrait of King Charles I (1600–1649), a copy of the famous painting by Anthony van Dyck, by King Charles II (1630–1685) in recognition of his support.

== Members of Parliament ==
- John Vyvyan (c.1526–1577), MP of Trelowarren, Cornwall.
- Hannibal Vyvyan (1554–1610), MP and Sheriff of Cornwall in 1601 and Vice-Admiral for South Cornwall from 1601 to 1607.
- Sir Francis Vyvyan (1575–1635), MP and Sheriff of Cornwall and briefly Vice-Admiral for South Cornwall after his father's retirement in 1607.
- Hannibal Vyvyan (1589–c.1657), MP of Lostwithiel, Cornwall.
- Sir Richard Vyvyan, 1st Baronet (c.1613–1665), a Royalist MP and Sheriff of Cornwall.
- Sir Richard Vyvyan, 8th Baronet (1800–1879) was a Conservative party member of Parliament in the UK. He represented Cornwall from 1825 to 1831; Okehampton from 1831 to 1832; and Bristol from the passage of the Reform Bill in 1832 until the dissolution of 1837. He served as High Sheriff of Cornwall in 1840. In 1841 he was returned as a member of Parliament for Helston, and represented Helston until his retirement from Parliament in 1857. In 1872 he was listed as the ninth largest landholder in Cornwall with 9,738 acres (39.41 km^{2}).

== Other family members ==
- Major General Charles Vyvyan (born 1944), retired British Army officer, former head of the British Defence Staff and Scarlet Rod
- Clara Coltman Vyvyan was an author and the second wife of the 10th Vyvyan baronet
- Jennifer Vyvyan, the distinguished soprano, was part of a cadet branch of the family.
- Rupert Everett is a notable British actor known for his appearances in such films as My Best Friend's Wedding and The Next Best Thing. He is a descendant of Opre Vyvyan, his maternal grandmother, and through her claims descent from both the Vyvyans and continental nobility.
- Air Vice Marshal Sir Arthur Vyell Vyvyan, prominent Royal Navy and Royal Air Force officer

== See also ==
- Great Cornish Families
- Vivian family of Trewan Hall
