= Hannibal Vyvyan =

Member of the Parliament of England (1554–1610)

Hannibal Vyvyan, sometimes spelled Vivian (1554 – 4 February 1610), of Trelowarren in Cornwall, was an English Member of Parliament (MP).

Vyvyan was the eldest son of John Vyvyan (died 1577), also an MP, and head of one of Cornwall's leading families. He represented Plympton Erle in the Parliament of 1585, Helston in 1586–87 and 1601, and Truro in 1588–89.

He was Captain of St Mawes Castle, High Sheriff of Cornwall in 1601 and Vice Admiral of South Cornwall from 1601 to 1607. He died at Blackfriars, London, at the age of 64 and was buried on 20 February 1610 at St Dunstan's in Middlesex.

== Personal life ==
Vyvyan married Philippa Tremayne (c. 1555 – 1612) in 1574, and they had several children. His eldest son, Sir Francis (died 1635), was also an MP and Sheriff as well as another son, Michael, who was MP for St Mawes. His grandson, Sir Richard, was the first Baronet of Trelowarren in 1645.
