= St Mawes Castle =

Device Fort in Falmouth, England

- Kastel Lannvowsedh
- Falmouth, Cornwall, England
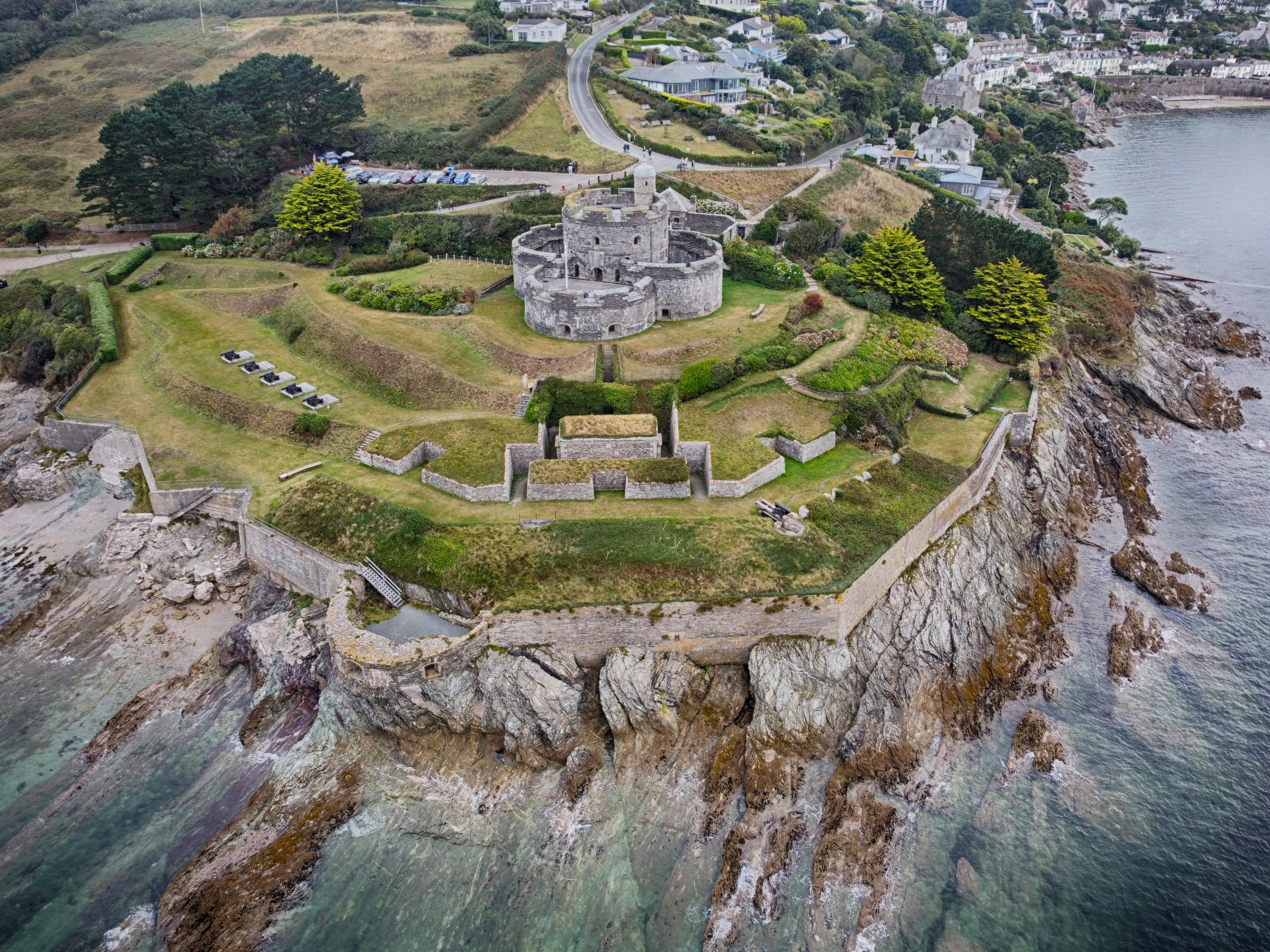
- The Henrician castle, seen from the landward side

Site information
- Type: Device Fort
- Owner: English Heritage
- Open to the public: Yes
- Condition: Intact

Location
- Shown within Cornwall
- Location within Cornwall
- Coordinates: 50°09′17″N 5°01′26″W

Site history
- Built: 1540–42
- Built by: Thomas Treffry
- In use: English civil war.
- Materials: Slate rubble, granite
- Events: English Civil War, Second World War

Scheduled monument
- Official name: St Mawes Castle
- Designated: 9 October 1981
- Reference no.: 1013807

Listed Building – Grade I
- Official name: St Mawes Castle, gatehouse, blockhouse, magazine and outer defences
- Designated: 25 June 1985
- Reference no.: 1136705

St Mawes Castle (Cornish: Kastel Lannvowsedh) is an artillery fort constructed by Henry VIII near Falmouth, Cornwall, between 1540 and 1542. It formed part of the King's Device programme to protect against invasion from France and the Holy Roman Empire, and defended the Carrick Roads waterway at the mouth of the River Fal. The castle was built under the direction of Thomas Treffry to a clover leaf design, with a four-storey central tower and three protruding, round bastions that formed gun platforms. It was initially armed with 19 artillery pieces, intended for use against enemy shipping, operating in partnership with its sister castle of Pendennis on the other side of the estuary. During the English Civil War, St Mawes was held by Royalist supporters of Charles I, but surrendered to a Parliamentary army in 1646 in the final phase of the conflict.

The castle continued in use as a fort through the 18th and 19th centuries. In the early 1850s, fears of a fresh conflict with France, combined with changes in military technology, led to the redevelopment of the fortification. The out-dated Henrician castle was turned into a barracks and substantial gun batteries were constructed beneath it, equipped with the latest naval artillery. In the 1880s and 1890s an electrically operated minefield was laid across the River Fal, operated from St Mawes and Pendennis, and new, quick-firing guns were installed at St Mawes to support these defences. After 1905, however, St Mawes' guns were removed, and between 1920 and 1939 it was run by the state as a tourist attraction.

Brought back into service in the Second World War, naval artillery and an anti-aircraft gun were installed at the castle to defend against the risk of German attack. With the end of the war, St Mawes again returned to use as a tourist attraction. In the 21st century, the castle is operated by English Heritage. The castle has elaborate, carved 16th-century decorations including sea monsters and gargoyles, and the historian Paul Pattison has described the site as "arguably the most perfect survivor of all Henry's forts".

The castle is a scheduled monument and Grade I listed building.

== History ==
=== 16th–17th centuries ===
==== Construction ====
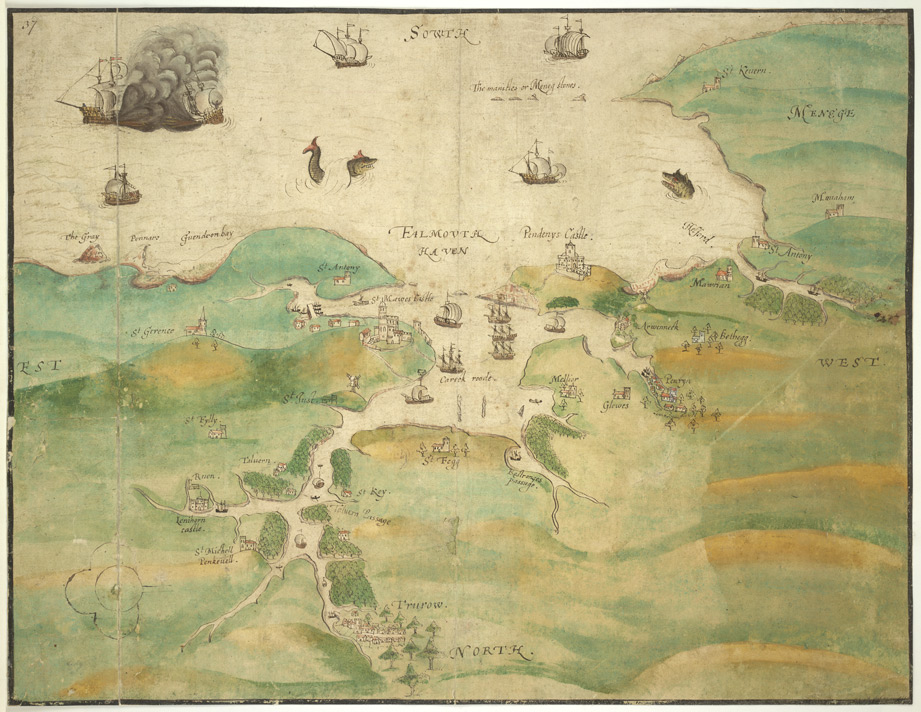
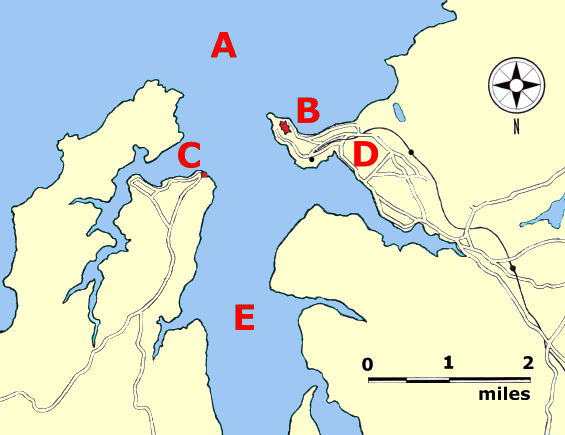
A late 16th-century plan of the Falmouth defences, and a modern equivalent; Key: A - Falmouth Bay; B - Pendennis Castle; C - St Mawes Castle; D - Falmouth; E - Carrick Roads

St Mawes Castle was built as a consequence of international tensions between England, France and the Holy Roman Empire in the final years of the reign of King Henry VIII. Traditionally the Crown had left coastal defences to the local lords and communities, only taking a modest role in building and maintaining fortifications, and while France and the Empire remained in conflict with one another, maritime raids were common but an actual invasion of England seemed unlikely. Basic defences, based around simple blockhouses and towers, existed in the south-west and along the Sussex coast, with a few more impressive works in the north of England, but in general the fortifications were very limited in scale.

In 1533, Henry broke with Pope Paul III in order to annul the long-standing marriage to his wife, Catherine of Aragon and remarry. Catherine was the aunt of Charles V, the Holy Roman Emperor, and he took the annulment as a personal insult. This resulted in France and the Empire declaring an alliance against Henry in 1538, and the Pope encouraging the two countries to attack England. An invasion of England appeared certain. In response, Henry issued an order, called a "device", in 1539, giving instructions for the "defence of the realm in time of invasion" and the construction of forts along the English coastline.

The stretch of water known as Carrick Roads at the mouth of the River Fal was an important anchorage serving shipping arriving from the Atlantic and the Mediterranean, and plans were made to protect it with five castles. In the event, only two of these were constructed, St Mawes and Pendennis, positioned on each side of Carrick Roads. The two castles' guns could provide overlapping fire across the water, while St Mawes also overlooked a separate anchorage on the eastern side of the estuary. The construction work began in 1540, under the direction of Thomas Treffry, a prominent member of the local gentry appointed to act as the project's Clerk of Works by Lord Admiral Russell. By later that year, the castle was described as being "half-made", with most of the build having been finished by 1542. The total cost of the project was £5,018. (Note: Comparing early modern costs and prices with those of the modern period is challenging. £5,018 in 1544 could be equivalent to between £2.1 million and £954 million in 2014, depending on the price comparison used. £534 in 1634 could equate to between £77,000 and £22 million. For comparison, the total royal expenditure on all the Device Forts across England between 1539–47 came to £376,500, with Sandgate Castle, for example, costing £5,584.)

The clover leaf shaped castle, with an additional small blockhouse at the water's edge below, was armed with 19 artillery pieces - a demi-cannon, a demi-culverin, a demi-sling, five slings, four portpieces and seven bases - along with 12 large hagbusshes, a form of arquebus. The artillery was originally mounted in the castle's stone bastions and was intended as "ship-sinking" weapons for use against enemy vessels. A smaller blockhouse was constructed beneath the main castle, at sea level; this may have been constructed ahead of the main castle build as a form of early protection. Normally the castle would have held a small garrison, which would have been supplemented by the local militia in the event of a crisis; St Mawes had 18 billhooks and 30 bows in its stores, probably for the use of the militia in such a situation.

==== Initial operation ====
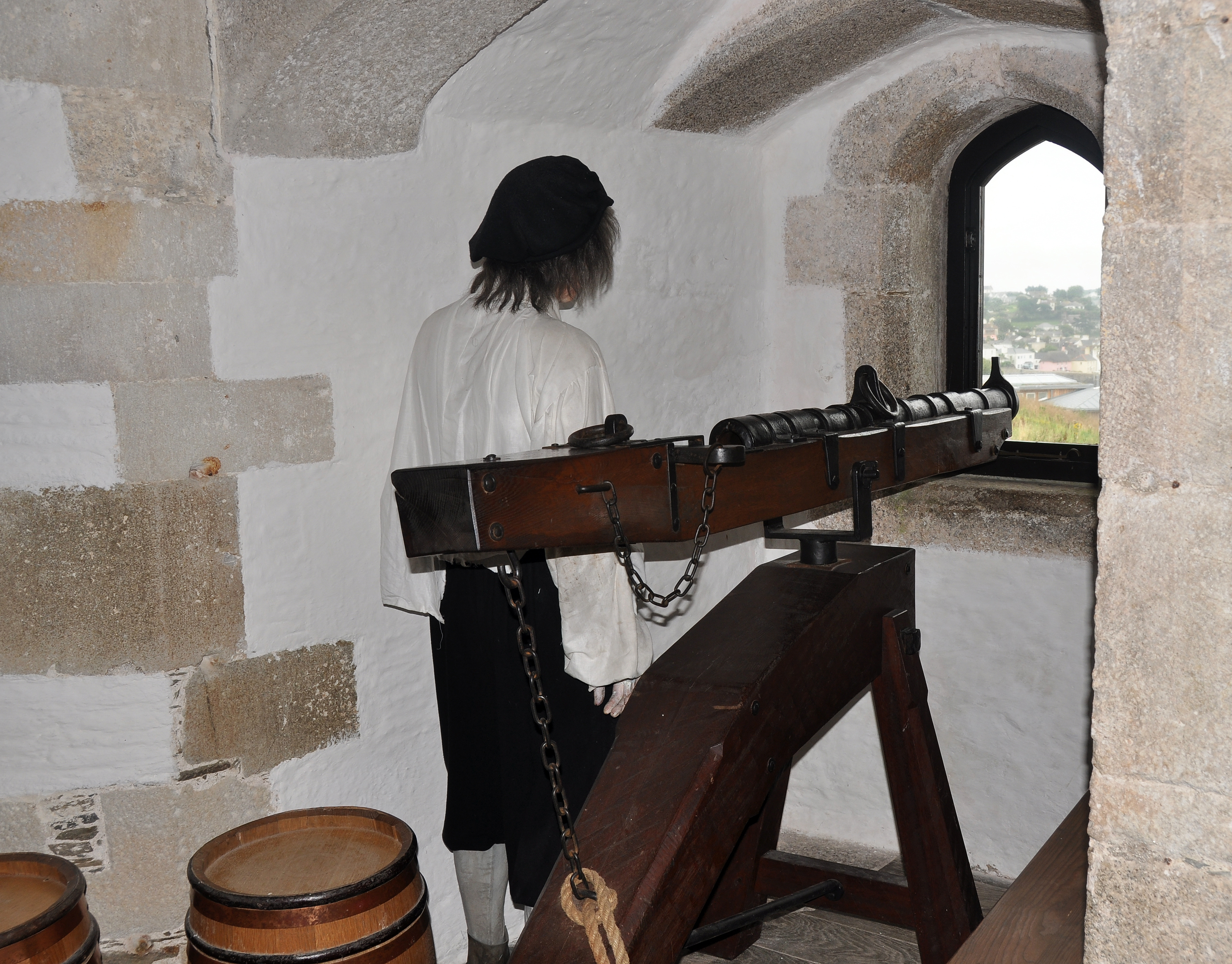
Replica 16th-century iron breech loader, in the Henrician central tower

Michael Vyvyan, a member of the local gentry, was appointed as the first captain of St Mawes and the surrounding land in 1544, and was followed by Hannibal Vyvyan in 1561. On Vyvyan's death in 1603, his son, Sir Francis Vyvyan, became captain. The captains of St Mawes frequently argued with those of Pendennis Castle and in 1630 a legal dispute broke out about the rights to search and detain incoming shipping: both castles argued that they had a traditional right to do so. The Admiralty issued a compromise, proposing that the castles share the incoming traffic. Sir Francis was dismissed from office in 1632, accused of "practising a variety of deceptions" at St Mawes, including falsely claiming wages for non-existent members of the garrison, and was replaced by first Sir Robert Le Grys and then Thomas Howard, the Earl of Arundel and Surrey.

Meanwhile, the invasion threat from France passed and a lasting peace was made in 1558, but the Spanish threat to the south-west of England grew in importance to the government. War broke out in 1569, with the threat of invasion and the garrison at St Mawes was strengthened: in 1578 it comprised 100 soldiers. An additional battery of guns was built to allow the fort to fire further upriver. Fears of a Spanish attack continued especially after the failed Armada of 1597; two earth and timber bastions were built out from the original stone castle to hold guns, eventually becoming the main batteries for the castle. By 1623 the castle held two brass culverins, six iron culverins, one demi-culverin and one saker, with a small garrison of 14 men, overseen by a captain and a lieutenant. A survey in 1634 indicated structural problems, and suggested that £534 was needed for repairs.

==== English Civil War and Restoration ====
When civil war broke out in 1642 between King Charles I and Parliament, St Mawes and the south-west of England was held by the Royalists. The growing town of Falmouth was a strategically important part of their supply routes to the Continent, while Carrick Roads formed a base for Royalist piracy in the English Channel. The war turned in favour of the Parliamentarians and, by March 1646, Thomas Fairfax had entered Cornwall with a substantial army.

The captain of St Mawes, Major Hannibal Bonithon, was invited by Colonel John Arundell, captain of Pendennis Castle, to join them in defending his stronger fortress, but Bonithon and his men quickly surrendered to the Parliamentarians instead without putting up any resistance. This decision has been put down to a result of war-weariness, the large numbers of Parliamentary troops facing them and the generous surrender terms on offer, although the 19th-century historian Samuel Oliver also suspected that Bonithon might have had Parliamentarian sympathies. 160 small arms and 13 artillery pieces were captured: the castle's guns were removed and redeployed in the siege of Pendennis, which fell that August.

The castle was placed on a "care and maintenance" footing, with a skeleton garrison. Parliament appointed George Kekewich as the new captain and he probably remained in post until the restoration of Charles II to the throne in 1660, when Sir Richard Vyvyan, Sir Francis's son, took over command. Richard inherited a garrison of 13 men, which he considered insufficient. Richard's son, Sir Vyel Vyvyan, became captain in turn on his father's death, but he had no heirs and separated the castle's lands from the captaincy, selling them to John Granville, the Earl of Bath.

=== 18th–19th centuries ===
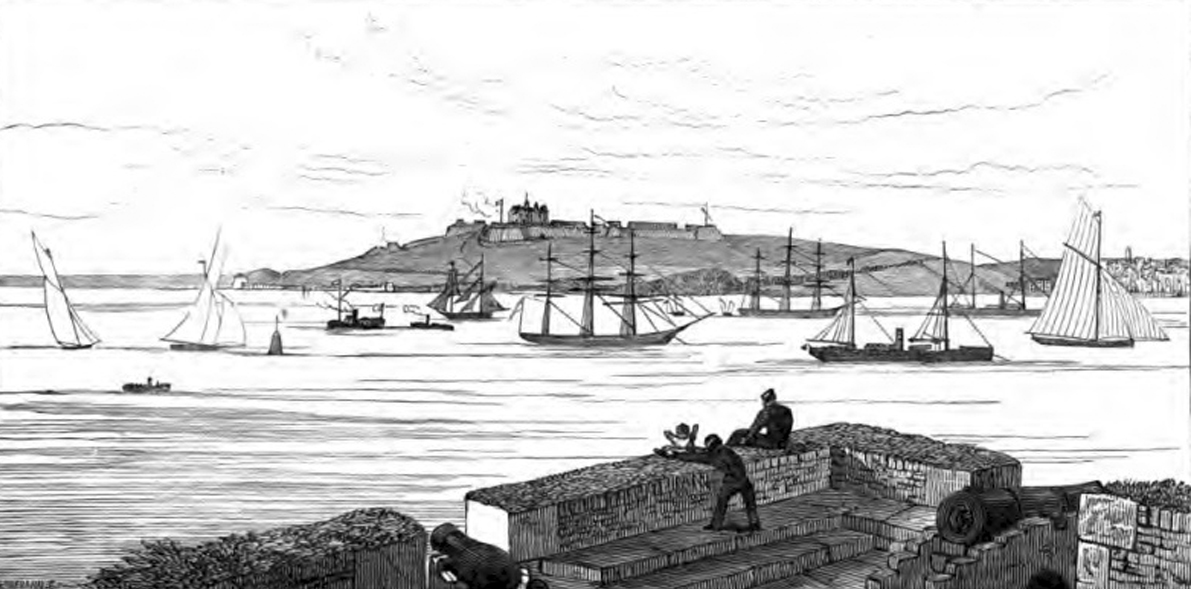
The view across Carrick Roads from St Mawes in 1875, showing Pendennis Castle in the distance

The castle continued in use as a fort through the 18th and 19th centuries under the command of successive captains, still operating in conjunction with Pendennis. A review by Colonel Christian Lilly in 1714 reported that the fortification was in a satisfactory condition, and in the 1730s, St Mawes was equipped with 17 artillery pieces, including six 24-pounder (11 kg) cannons, mostly positioned in the batteries beneath the Henrician castle. Britain's wars with France in the late-18th century made the defence of Falmouth critical and from 1775 until 1780 the local militia was called up to defend St Mawes. By the 1780s, the castle was equipped with over 30 pieces of heavy artillery. There were repeated concerns emerged about its ordnance, however, and an inspection in 1797 during the French Revolutionary Wars found that only one 24-pounder gun was serviceable.

In 1796, a new gun battery was created at St Anthony Head, just along the coast from St Mawes. For a period this battery became the primary defensive position on the east side of the estuary, although in 1805 St Mawes was still armed with ten 24-pounder guns. The poet Lord Byron, visiting in 1809, complained that St Mawes was "extremely well calculated for annoying every body except an enemy", and commented that the fort was garrisoned by only one, elderly man. At the end of the Napoleonic Wars in 1815, the St Anthony's battery was closed but St Mawes remained in use, albeit being operated once again on a "care and maintenance" basis in the post-war years.

Falmouth Harbour became one of the most important ports in England during the 19th century, attracting much of the transatlantic shipping trade. The Tudor office of the captaincy was abolished in 1849, with the death of the final incumbent, Sir George Nugent, and the command of the garrison became a regular military appointment. In the early 1850s, fears of a conflict with France led to a review of the state of the harbour's defences. The development of ironclad warships equipped with rifled guns meant that St Mawes required a comprehensive overhaul. A new Grand Sea Battery and magazine was built beneath the Henrician castle, linked with deep passages, and equipped with eight 56-pound (25 kg) and four 64-pounder (29 kg) rifled muzzle loader guns. The old castle was used as a barracks but, since it could only hold 30 men, St Mawes was typically used as a training base and manned by militia and volunteer units.

Fresh concerns about France rose in the 1880s, and an electrically operated minefield was laid across Carrick Roads in 1885, jointly controlled from St Mawes and Pendennis. Additional contact mines were added, forcing incoming vessels to sail into a channel alongside St Mawes, illuminated with electric search lights. As part of this transformation, the castle's 64-pounder guns were partially replaced with light, quick-firing guns in the 1890s, able to engage any torpedo boats or mine sweepers attempting to break through the defences. The batteries for these were found to be poorly sited, and an additional battery was therefore built above the Henrician castle between 1900 and 1901, again for housing quick-firing guns.

=== 20th–21st centuries ===
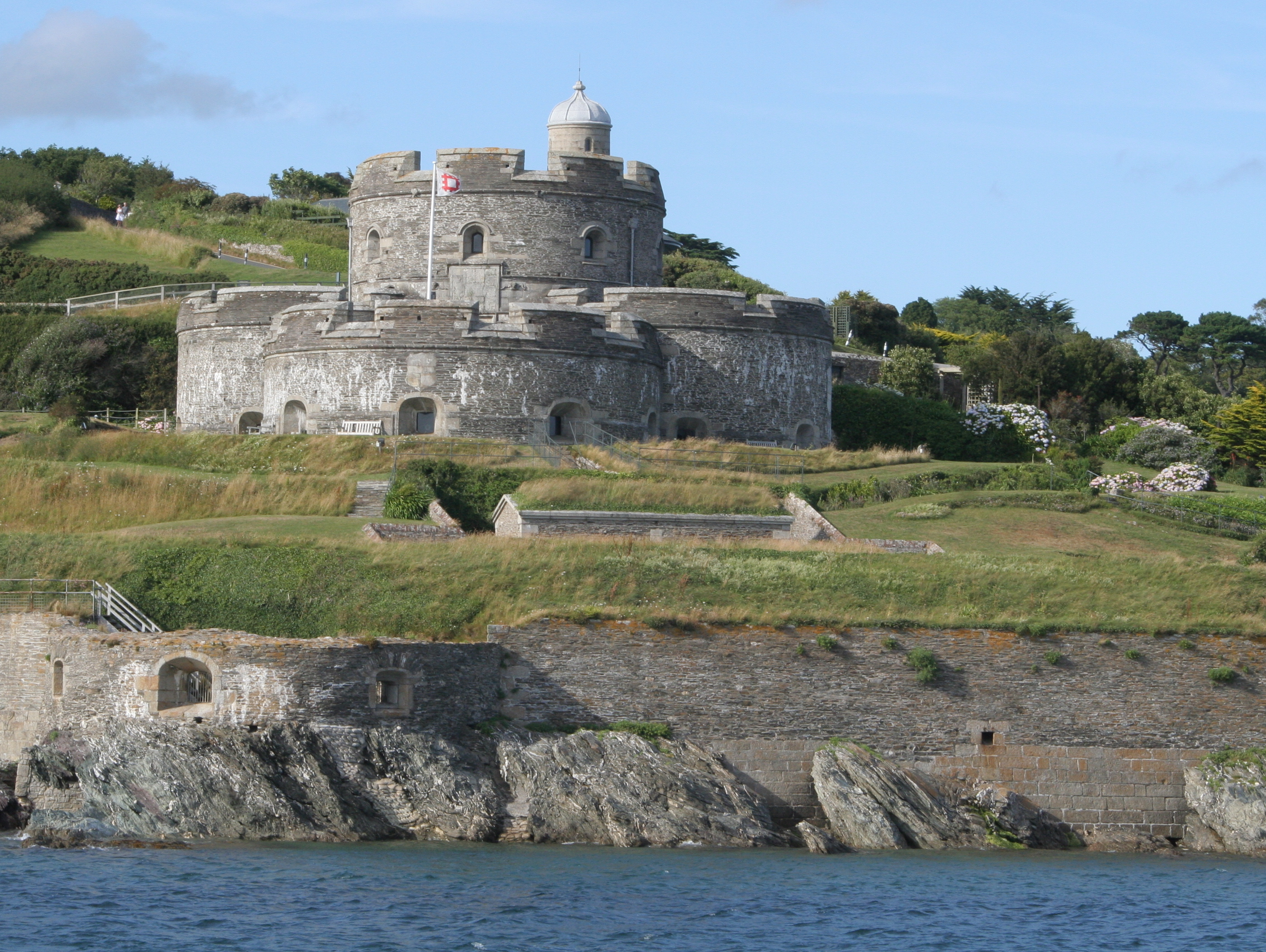
St Mawes seen from the sea, showing the Henrician castle (top), the Grand Sea Battery and magazine, and the 16th-century blockhouse (bottom)

A 1905 review of the Falmouth defences concluded that the naval artillery at St Mawes had become superfluous, as the necessary guns could be mounted at combination of Pendennis and the recently re-established battery at St Anthony's instead. Disarmed, St Mawes was then used as a barracks in the First World War. In 1920 the castle was transferred to the control of the government's Office of Works, and was opened to visitors, being promoted as a tourist destination by the Great Western Railway company who hoped to profit by increased numbers of visitors to Falmouth.

With the outbreak of the Second World War in 1939, St Mawes was reoccupied by the British Army. In late 1941, the No 173 Coast Battery took over running a new, twin 6-pounder (2.7 kg) battery positioned just north-west of the castle, combined with a 40-millimetre (1.6 in) Bofors gun closer to the castle for anti-aircraft protection, and searchlights along the base of the Grand Sea Magazine. Some of the 115-strong garrison lived in a local Nissen hut, with the remainder housed in St Mawes itself.

The castle was removed from active service in January 1945 and reopened to the public the following year. The Second World War gun battery was finally closed in 1956 after several years of use as a training site. Between 1945 and 1970, much of the Victorian earthwork and concrete defences were cleared from the Grand Sea Battery, and the 1941 battery was completely destroyed.

In the 21st century, St Mawes Castle is operated by English Heritage as a tourist attraction, receiving 21,104 visitors in 2010. It is protected under UK law as a Scheduled Monument.

== Architecture ==
St Mawes Castle is situated on a headland over the Carrick Roads, overlooked by higher land to the rear. At the top of the site is the entrance to the castle, the high-level gun batteries and the 16th-century Henrician Castle; the terraced site slopes down to the water, where gun batteries and the 16th-century blockhouse look out across the water.

=== Henrician castle ===
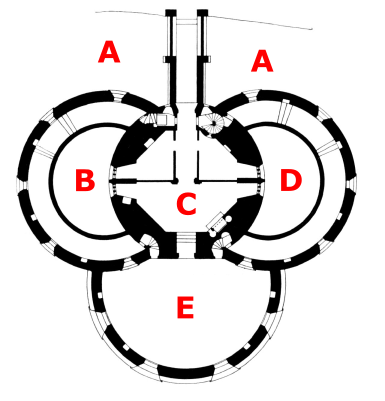
Plan of the second floor of the Henrician castle. Key: A - moat; B - side bastion; C - central tower; D - side bastion; E - front bastion

The central castle is built from slatestone rubble, with granite features and detailing; it has a clover leaf design with a central, four-storey circular tower, or keep, at its core, and three circular bastions emerging from it. The design allowed for multiple levels of artillery, and may have been influenced by the contemporary work of the Moravian engineer, Stefan von Haschenperg, on some of the other Device Forts constructed during this period. It had little protection to the landward side, and would have depended upon the local militia providing protection against such an attack. The castle has been little altered since its original construction, and the historian Paul Pattison considers it to be "arguably the most perfect survivor of all Henry's forts".

The castle is extensively decorated with carvings and inscriptions in stone and wood, praising Henry VIII and his lineage, leading the historian A. L. Rowse to describe the castle as the most decorative of all of Henry's building works. These include Latin verses, such as "Henry, thy honour and praises will remain forever", written by the antiquarian John Leland, and "Let fortunate Cornwall rejoice that Edward is now her Duke", referring to Henry's eldest son and heir. Carved sea monsters and gargoyles also feature around the fortification, along with heraldic shields which would originally have been painted and visible from the river.

The castle is entered through the gatehouse, a polygonal, stone building approximately 25 feet (7.6 m) across. The gatehouse has gunloops, murder holes and slots for a drawbridge, although it is uncertain if one was ever fitted; it would originally have formed a sort of protective barbican. The yard behind it is approximately 20 by 59 feet (6 by 18 m) and dates from before 1735, originally being used a stable. This leads to a stone bridge that crosses a 25 feet (7.5 m) wide moat, cut out of the rock, to the main castle.

The central tower is 47 feet (14 m) across and 44 feet (13 m) high, with 8 feet (2.4 m) thick walls. The basement was originally a kitchen and storerooms, with the first floor was subdivided and used by the garrison, before being later converted for storing gunpowder. The bridge across the moat leads into the second storey, which originally had four chambers with fireplaces and windows, linked by a central corridor; this area may have been used by the castle's officers, and to house an enlarged garrison in an emergency. The third floor forms a single, large room with gun embrasures, and was probably used by the garrison as living accommodation. Above it, the parapetted gun platform on the fourth floor could support up to seven guns and incorporates a lookout turret, topped by a 17th-century cupola, designed as a daymark to guide passing ships.

The central tower is linked to the forward bastion, 59 feet (18 m) in diameter, which in turn has steps leading to the side bastions, each 54-foot (16.4 m) across. Each of the bastions forms a gun platform, with embrasures for larger artillery pieces - five in the forward bastion, three on each of the sides - as well as swivel mounts for lighter guns, and parapets for protection. The forward bastion's roof is modern and was added after an archaeological debate in the 1960s as to whether the bastions would originally have been covered. The bastions have various 18th- and 19th-century artillery pieces on display, as well as a bronze saker dating from 1560 called the Albergheti gun, recovered from a shipwreck off the coast of Devon.

=== Batteries and auxiliary buildings ===
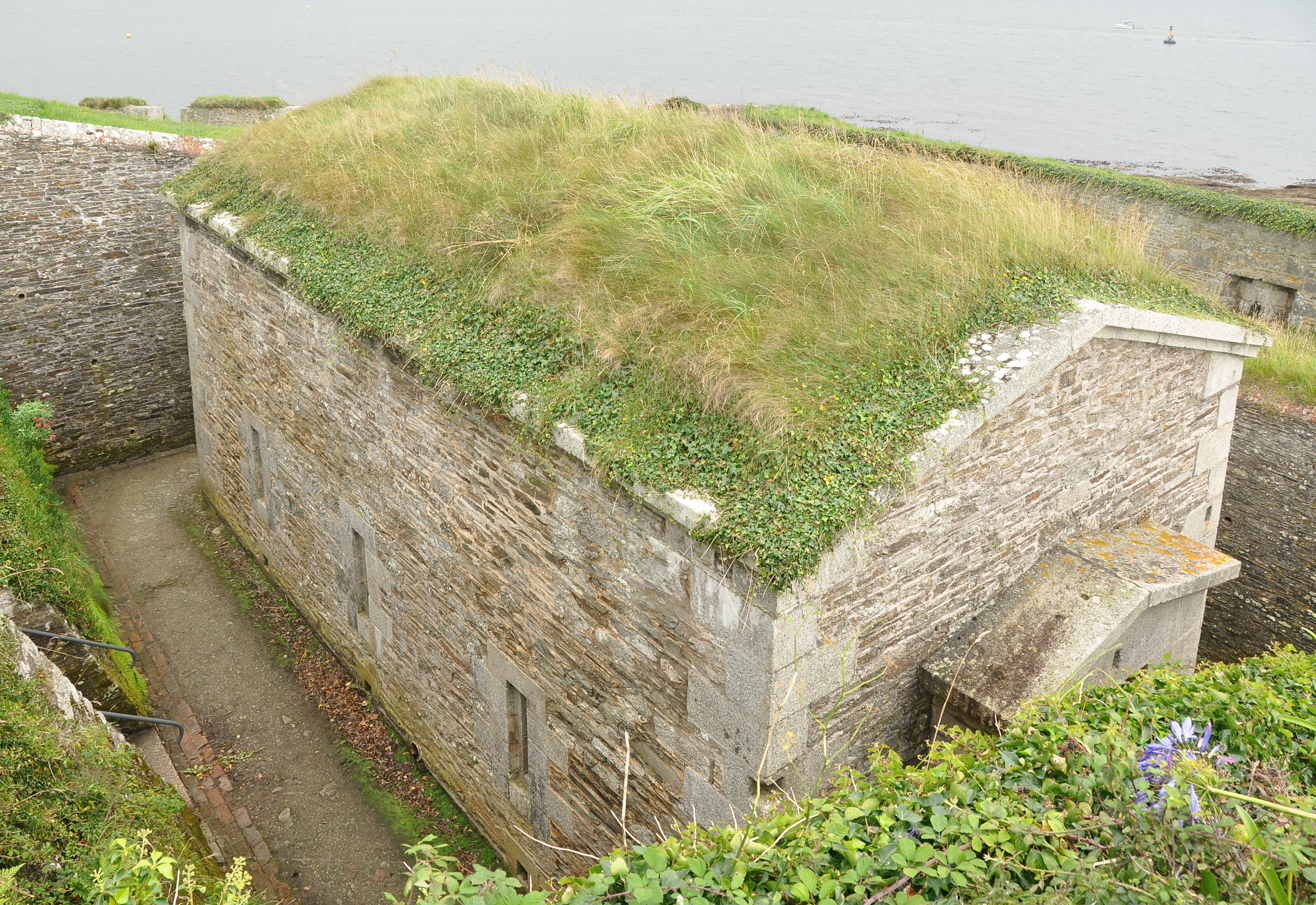
19th-century magazine in the Grand Sea Battery

Gun batteries and other auxiliary buildings stretch across the St Mawes Castle site. Above the Henrician castle is the 12-pounder quick-firing high-level battery, dating from the start of the 20th century. Its four concrete platforms and earth parapets have survived, along with an underground magazine just behind the site. A small bungalow from this period at the entrance to the battery is still in use, serving as the English Heritage custodian's house. Alongside the Henrician castle is the Engine House, approximately 41 feet (12 m) square and dating from around 1902. It originally contained an internal combustion engine, generating power for the castle's searchlights, but was later converted into a storeroom.

Beneath the Henrician castle is a complex of artillery positions, cut out of the rock from around 1854 onwards, and collectively known as the Grand Sea Battery. The Grand Sea Battery was served by a 19th-century magazine for holding gunpowder, approximately 35 by 18 feet (10.7 by 5.5 m) with stone walls and bomb-proof brick roof, topped with turf to help to protect against incoming shells. For many years the magazine was protected by an additional concrete fortification, but this was removed in 1970. There are two gun platforms along the west and east sides of the complex, 110 feet (34 m) and 80 feet (24 m) across respectively and known as the Lower Gun Battery. The current design of the western platform dates from the 1890s, with two raised concrete platforms for rotating guns and a brick-vaulted magazine just behind the battery. The eastern platform has pivots and racers for mounting four traversing gun carriages, one of which now houses a 12-pound smooth-bore artillery piece dating from 1815, mounted on a replica carriage.

Just below the Grand Sea Battery is the 16th-century blockhouse, positioned by the water's edge, 160 feet (49 m) from the Henrician castle. The blockhouse is semi-circular in shape, with 56 feet (17 m) wide with 9.8-foot (3 m) thick stone walls facing the sea, but much thinner walls to the rear. It originally had four gunports, one of which has since been blocked up, along with an upper gun platform and battlements. The upper storey was later destroyed to turn it into a solid gun platform, although this has since been re-excavated. Beside the blockhouse are the foundations of four searchlight emplacements dating from the Second World War.

To the west of the Grand Sea Battery are landscaped gardens, built on top of earlier gun positions along the site. Five 19th-century smooth-bore guns from the Napoleonic period are on display, forming a saluting battery. Beyond the gardens is the site of the Second World War 6-pounder battery, but little now remains of this position.

== List of captains ==
- 1544–1561: Michael Vyvyan
- 1561–1603: Hannibal Vyvyan
- 1603–1632: Sir Francis Vyvyan (dismissed)
- 1633–1634: Sir Robert le Grys
- Thomas Howard, 21st Earl of Arundel (died 1646)
- ?–1646: Major Hannibal Bonithon (Royalist)
- 1646–?1660: George Kekewich (Parliamentarian)
- c.1650: Colonel Robert Bennett (Parliamentarian)
- 1660–?1665: Sir Richard Vyvyan, 1st Baronet
- 1665–1678: Sir Vyell Vyvyan, 2nd Baronet
- 1678–1696: Sir Joseph Tredenham
- 1696–1710: Hugh Boscawen, 1st Viscount Falmouth
- 1710–1714: Francis Scobell (MP for St Mawes)
- 1714–1734: Hugh Boscawen, 1st Viscount Falmouth
- 1734–?1740: Major De Roen
- 1740–1745: Scipio Duroure (killed at the Battle of Fontenoy, 1745)
- 1745–?1765: Alexander Duroure (died 1765)
- 1765–1796: Sir Robert Pigot, 2nd Baronet
- August 1796–November 1796: Colonel Edward Morrison (Governor of Chester, 1796–1844)
- 1796–1849: Sir George Nugent, 1st Baronet

== See also ==
- Castles in Great Britain and Ireland

== Bibliography ==
- Biddle, Martin; Hiller, Jonathon; Scott, Ian; Streeten, Anthony (2001). Henry VIII's Coastal Artillery Fort at Camber Castle, Rye, East Sussex: An Archaeological Structural and Historical Investigation. Oxford, UK: Oxbow Books. ISBN 0904220230.
- Bull, Stephen (2008). 'The Furie of the Ordnance': Artillery in the English Civil Wars. Woodbridge, UK: Boydell Press. ISBN 9781843834038.
- Department of the Environment (1975). Pendennis and St Mawes Castles. London, UK: Her Majesty's Stationery Office. ISBN 0116703091.
- Hale, John R. (1983). Renaissance War Studies. London, UK: Hambledon Press. ISBN 0907628176.
- Harrington, Peter (2007). The Castles of Henry VIII. Oxford, UK: Osprey Publishing. ISBN 9781472803801.
- Jenkins, Stanley C. (2007). "St Mawes Castle, Cornwall". Fort. 35: 153–172.
- King, D. J. Cathcart (1991). The Castle in England and Wales: An Interpretative History. London, UK: Routledge Press. ISBN 9780415003506.
- Mackenzie, James D. (1896). The Castles of England: Their Story and Structure, Volume II. New York, US: Macmillan. OCLC 504892038.
- Morley, B. M. (1976). Henry VIII and the Development of Coastal Defence. London, UK: Her Majesty's Stationery Office. ISBN 0116707771.
- Oliver, Samuel Pasfield (1875). Pendennis and St Mawes: An Historical Sketch of Two Cornish Castles. Truro, UK: W. Lake. OCLC 23442843.
- Pattison, Paul (2009). Pendennis Castle and St Mawes Castle. London, UK: English Heritage. ISBN 9781848020221.
- Thompson, M. W. (1987). The Decline of the Castle. Cambridge, UK: Cambridge University Press. ISBN 1854226088.
- Walton, Steven A. (2010). "State Building Through Building for the State: Foreign and Domestic Expertise in Tudor Fortification". Osiris. 25 (1): 66–84. doi:10.1086/657263. S2CID 144384757.
