= Vyvyan baronets =

Title in the Baronetage of England

The Vyvyan Baronetcy of Trelowarren, Cornwall, is a title in the Baronetage of England. It was created on 12 February 1645 for Richard Vyvyan, a member of Parliament for Penrhyn, Tregony and St Mawes and Master of the Mint. His eldest son, the second Baronet, represented St Mawes and Helston in the House of Commons. He was succeeded in 1697 by his son, the third Baronet, was a member of Parliament for Mitchell and Cornwall and a prominent Jacobite. The eighth Baronet sat as Conservative Member of Parliament for Cornwall, Okehampton, Bristol and Helston. His grandson, the tenth Baronet, was a Colonel in the British Army. As of 28 February 2014, the present Baronet has not successfully proven his succession and is therefore not on the Official Roll of the Baronetage, with the baronetcy officially considered dormant since 1995. The family seat is Trelowarren, near Mawgan, Cornwall.

The Royal Warrant of 1911 which governs the recognition of baronetcies suggests that if a baronetcy is dormant or vacant the title should not be acknowledged in official documents; however in this case it has been acknowledged. The London Gazette of 14 March 2008 stated that "The Prince of Wales has been pleased to direct Letters Patent to be passed under the Privy Seal of His Royal Highness appointing Sir Ralph Ferrers Alexander Vyvyan Bt of Trelowarren, Helston in the County of Cornwall, High Sheriff of Cornwall."

== Vyvyan Baronets, of Trelowarren (1645) ==
- Sir Richard Vyvyan, 1st Baronet (c. 1613–1665)
- Sir Vyell Vyvyan, 2nd Baronet (1639–1696/97)
- Sir Richard Vyvyan, 3rd Baronet (1681–1736)
- Sir Francis Vyvyan, 4th Baronet (1698–1745)
- Sir Richard Vyvyan, 5th Baronet (1731–1781)
- Sir Carew Vyvyan, 6th Baronet (1737–1814)
- Sir Vyell Vyvyan, 7th Baronet (1767–1820)
- Sir Richard Vyvyan, 8th Baronet (1800–1879)
- The Rev. Sir Vyell Donnithorne Vyvyan, 9th Baronet (1826–1917), Rector of Withiel
- Sir Courtenay Bourchier Vyvyan, 10th Baronet (1858–1941)
- Sir Richard Philip Vyvyan, 11th Baronet (1891–1978)
- Sir John Stanley Vyvyan, 12th Baronet (1916–1995)
- Sir Ralph Ferrers Alexander Vyvyan, 13th Baronet (born 1960)

The heir apparent is the present holder's son Joshua Drummond Vyvyan.

Clara Coltman Rogers Vyvyan, the second wife of the 10th Baronet, wrote a number of books using the name C. C. Vyvyan; these include Our Cornwall; Amateur Gardening for Pleasure and Profit; Cornish Silhouettes; Echoes in Cornwall; Gwendra Cove; and Bird Symphony (an anthology).

== See also ==
- Vyvyan family
