= Amice (name) =

Amice is a given name and surname. Notable people with the name include:

== Surname ==
- Israel Amice (c.1548–1607), MP in Cornwall
- Yvette Amice (1936–1993), French mathematician

== Given name ==
- Amice, Countess of Rochefort (died 1215), English noblewoman
- Amice Calverley (1896–1959), English-born Canadian Egyptologist
- Amice de Clare (c.1220–1284), daughter of Gilbert de Clare, 4th Earl of Hertford
