= Charles Godfrey (courtier) =

English Army officer, courtier and Whig politician

Colonel Charles Godfrey

Member of the England Parliament for Malmesbury
- In office 1689–1689
- Monarch: Mary II / William III

Member of the England Parliament for Wycombe
- In office 26 October 1691 – 1707
- Monarchs: Mary II / William III; Anne
- Preceded by: William Jephson

Member of Parliament for Wycombe
- In office 1707–1710
- Monarch: George I
- Succeeded by: Sir John Wittewronge

Personal details
- Born: c. 1646 Norfolk, England
- Died: 23 February 1714 (aged 67–68) Bath, Somerset, England
- Resting place: Bath Abbey, Bath, England
- Spouse: Arabella Churchill
- Children: Francis Godfrey; Elizabeth (m. Edmund Dunch); Charlotte (m. Hugh Boscawen II)

Colonel Charles Godfrey (1646 – 23 February 1714) was an English Army officer, courtier and Whig politician who sat in the English and British House of Commons for 22 years between 1689 and 1713.

== Early life ==
Godfrey came from a recusant family, originating in Norfolk, and was the son of Francis Godfrey of Little Chelsea, Middlesex and his wife Anne née Blount. He was born on 6 November 1646 in Westminster, and was baptised on 26 November at Mapledurham, Oxfordshire. He joined the cavalry and was a captain in the Grenadier Guards in 1674. In 1678, he was lieutenant-colonel of Sir Thomas Slingsby's regiment and then captain-lieutenant of horse in the Duke of Monmouth's regiment. He became a major of horse in Lord Gerard's regiment in 1679.

Godfrey married Arabella Churchill, former mistress of King James II, on 1 June 1680 at Holy Trinity Minories, London. He was thus brother-in-law of John Churchill, 1st Duke of Marlborough and on course for preferment in the Royal Household. He also became a close friend and political protégé of Thomas Wharton. He was one of the first to join the Prince of Orange at the Revolution and was rewarded with his own regiment, as Colonel of Godfrey's Regiment of Cuirassiers in 1688.

== Career ==
Godfrey was returned as Member of Parliament for Malmesbury at the 1689 general election. In 1690 he stood unsuccessfully for Parliament at Westminster. He was returned at a by-election on 26 October 1691 as MP for Wycombe (also known as Chipping Wycombe) by his friend Thomas Wharton. He was returned again in 1695 and 1698. He was appointed Master of the Jewel Office in 1698.

In 1704, he was appointed a Clerk of the Green Cloth a position in the British Royal Household and held the post for the rest of his life. The clerk acted as secretary of the Board of Green Cloth, and was therefore responsible for organising royal journeys and assisting in the administration of the Royal Household.

He was returned as MP for Wycombe at the 1705 English general election. At the 1708 British general election, he was again returned as Whig MP for Wycombe, voting accordingly for naturalizing the Palatines in 1709 and for the impeachment of Dr Sacheverell in 1710. He was returned unopposed again at the 1710 British general election and voted for the ‘No Peace Without Spain’ motion on 7 December 1711, but against his party for the French commerce bill on 18 June 1713. Wharton refused to support him at the 1713 British general election and he was unable to find a seat elsewhere.

Godfrey lived in Great Windmill Street near Piccadilly Circus, London.

== Death and legacy ==
Godfrey died on 23 February 1714 while on a visit to Bath, Somerset and was buried in Bath Abbey.

He and his wife had a son and two daughters. His son Francis served as the MP for St. Mawes from 1705 till 1710, and predeceased Godfrey in 1712. His daughter Elizabeth married Edmund Dunch MP (1677–1719) and Charlotte married Hugh Boscawen, 1st Viscount Falmouth (1675–1734).

Parliament of England
Preceded by Sir Thomas Estcourt; John Fitzherbert	Member of Parliament for Malmesbury; 1689–1690; With: Thomas Tollemache	Succeeded by Goodwin Wharton; Sir James Long
Preceded by Thomas Lewes; William Jephson	Member of Parliament for Wycombe; 1691–1707; With: Thomas Lewes 1691–1696; Fleetwood Dormer 1696–1698, 1701–1707; John Archdale 1698–1699; Thomas Archdale 1699–1700	Succeeded by Parliament of Great Britain
Parliament of Great Britain
Preceded by Parliament of England	Member of Parliament for Wycombe; 1707–1713; With: Fleetwood Dormer 1707–1710; Sir Thomas Lee 1710–1713	Succeeded by Sir Thomas Lee; Sir John Wittewronge
Political offices
Preceded by Hon. Heneage Montagu	Master of the Jewel Office; 1698–1704	Succeeded by John Charlton
Military offices
Preceded by The Earl of Selkirk	Colonel of Godfrey's Regiment of Cuirassiers; 1688–1693	Succeeded by Francis Langston
