= John Tredenham =

English politician

John Tredenham (1668 – 25 December 1710) was an English politician who sat as MP for St. Mawes.

== Family and education ==
He was baptised on 28 March 1668. He was the second but first surviving son of Sir Joseph Tredenham (died 1707) and Elizabeth (died 1731), the daughter of Sir Edward Seymour, 3rd Baronet and the brother of Seymour Tredenham. He was admitted into the Inner Temple in 1682 and matriculated from Christ Church, Oxford in 1684. While at Oxford, he contributed verses celebrating the accession of James II.

On 1 February 1690, he married Anne, the daughter and heiress of Sir John Lloyd, 2nd Baronet though his father disapproved of the match and they had one daughter who predeceased him.

== Parliamentary career ==
In 1689, he contested Truro but was unsuccessful. In 1690, after his uncle, Henry Seymour Portman decided to sit elsewhere, Tredenham was returned in a by-election for St. Mawes. He was re-elected to St. Mawes in 1695. On 9 November 1696, there is a noted absence from the Commons and he was likely absent for the vote on the attainder of Sir John Fenwick, 3rd Baronet. On 1 December 1696, he was discharged from custody after being absent without leave. In 1698, he was re-elected to St. Mawes.

In 1701, he was returned for St. Mawes again. In 1708, he was re-elected again for St. Mawes. In 1710, he returned unopposed for St. Mawes, but died on 25 December 1710 after falling from his coach box (or possibly from overindulgence in food).

Preceded by Henry Seymour Portman; Sir Joseph Tredenham	Member of Parliament for St. Mawes; 9 April 1690 – 1705; With: Sir Joseph Tredenham; Seymour Tredenham; Henry Seymour Portman	Succeeded by Sir Joseph Tredenham; Francis Godfrey
Preceded by Sir Joseph Tredenham; Francis Godfrey	Member of Parliament for St. Mawes; 21 November 1707 – 25 December 1710; With: Francis Godfrey; Richard Onslow, 1st Baron Onslow	Succeeded by John Anstis; Richard Onslow, 1st Baron Onslow
