= Edward Wrightington =

Edward Wrightington (born c. 1580) was an English lawyer and politician who sat in the House of Commons from 1621 to 1622.

Wrightington was the son of John of Wrightington of Lancashire. He matriculated at Brasenose College, Oxford, on 9 February 1594, aged 13. In 1621, he was elected member of parliament for St Mawes. He was a bencher of Gray's Inn in 1637.

Parliament of England
Preceded by Francis Vyvyan; Sir Nicholas Smith	Member of Parliament for St Mawes; 1621; With: William Hockmere	Succeeded by John Arundell; William Hockmere
