= John Anstey =

John Anstey may refer to:

- John Anstey (politician) (1856–1940), New Zealand farmer and member of parliament
- John Anstey (poet) (died 1907), English poet and barrister
