= James Sheffield =

James Sheffield may refer to:

- James Sheffield, Lord Sheffield, 17th-century member of the English House of Commons
- James P. Sheffield, 19th-century American ship captain
- James R. Sheffield (1864–1938), American attorney and U.S. Ambassador to Mexico
