= William Priestley =

William Priestley may refer to:

- William Priestley (St Mawes MP) (c.1594–1664), lawyer and member of the English House of Commons.
- William Priestley (Louisiana planter) (1771–1838), second son of Dr Joseph Priestley
- William Priestley (wool clothier) (1779–1861), Halifax wool clothier, and founder of the Halifax Choral Society
- Sir William Overend Priestley (1829–1900), gynaecologist and Conservative politician
- Sir William Priestley (Liberal politician) (1859–1932), Liberal politician

See also

- William Priestly MacIntosh (1857-1930), Australian sculptor
