= St Catherine's Castle =

Castle in Cornwall, England

- Kastel S. Kattryn (Cornish)
- Fowey, Cornwall, England
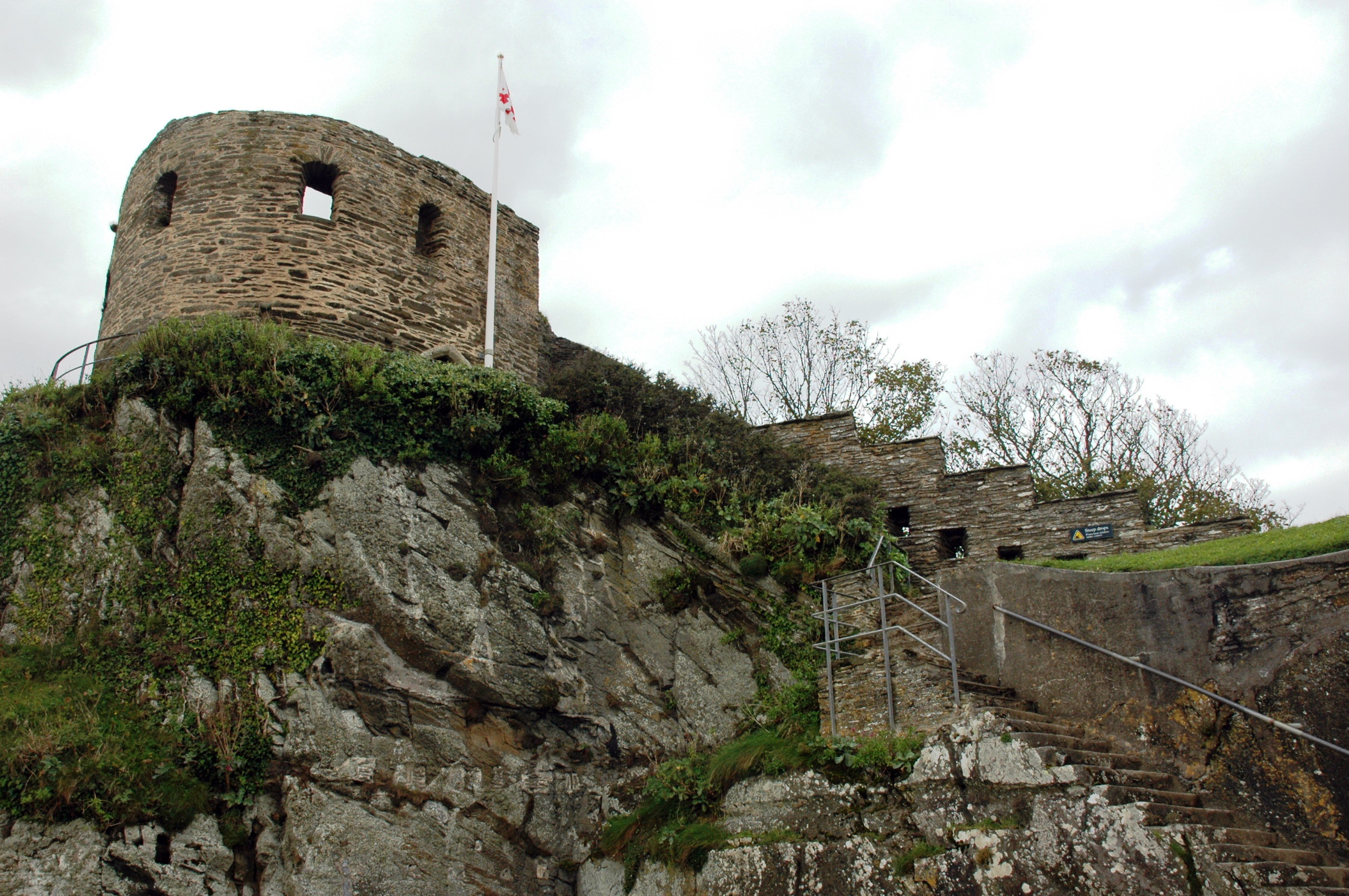
- The blockhouse of St Catherine's Castle, seen from the gun platform

Site information
- Type: Henrician castle
- Owner: English Heritage
- Open to the public: Yes
- Condition: Ruined

Location
- Location within Cornwall
- Coordinates: 50°19′41.6″N 4°38′40.0″W

Site history
- Built: Circa 1538–40
- Built by: Thomas Treffry
- Materials: Slate rubble
- Events: English Civil War; Napoleonic Wars; Crimean War; Second World War

Listed Building – Grade II*
- Official name: St Catherine's Castle
- Designated: 11 March 1974
- Reference no.: 1218875

St Catherine's Castle (Cornish: Kastel S. Kattryn) is a Henrician castle in Cornwall, England, built by Thomas Treffry between approximately 1538 and 1540, in response to fears of an invasion of England by France and the Holy Roman Empire. The D-shaped, stone fortification, equipped with five gun-ports for cannon, overlooked the mouth of the River Fowey in Cornwall. It was protected by a curtain wall and the surrounding cliffs. The castle remained in use for many years until it was closed at the end of the Napoleonic Wars in 1815. Brought back into service in 1855 during the Crimean War, it was fitted with two new artillery positions, but it soon became obsolete and was abandoned. During the Second World War the castle was refortified and used to house a battery of naval guns, protecting the coast against the threat of German attack. At the end of the conflict the castle was restored to its previous condition and is now managed by English Heritage as a tourist attraction.

== History ==
=== Construction ===
St Catherine's Castle was built as a consequence of the international tensions between England, France and the Holy Roman Empire in the final years of the reign of King Henry VIII. Traditionally the Crown had left coastal defences to the local lords and communities, only taking a modest role in building and maintaining fortifications, and while France and the Empire remained in conflict with one another, maritime raids were common but an actual invasion of England seemed unlikely. Modest defences, based around simple blockhouses and towers, existed in the south-west and along the Sussex coast, with a few more impressive works in the north of England, but in general the fortifications were very limited in scale.

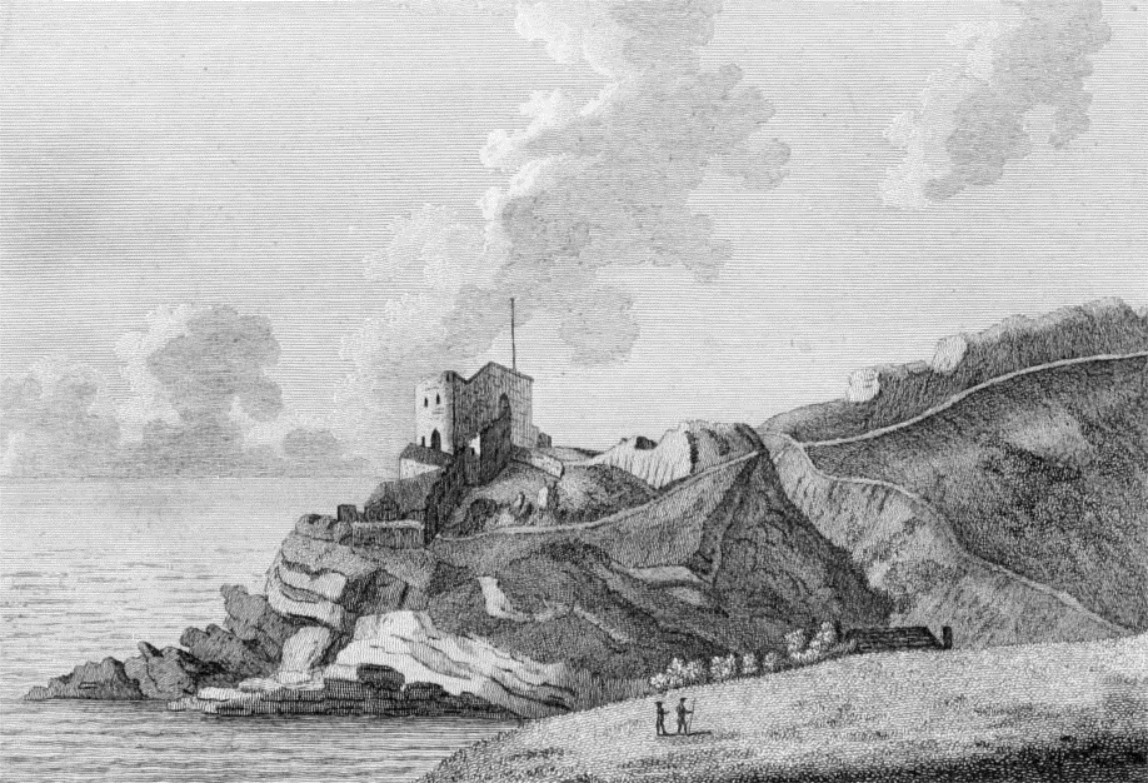
The castle seen from the east in 1786

In 1533, Henry broke with Pope Paul III in order to annul his long-standing marriage to Catherine of Aragon and remarry. Catherine was the aunt of Charles V, the Holy Roman Emperor, and he took the annulment as a personal insult. This resulted in France and the Empire declaring an alliance against Henry in 1538, and the Pope encouraging the two countries to attack England. An invasion of England now appeared certain and Henry began to improve his coastal defences.

In response to this situation, a small, D-shaped stone fortification was built to protect Fowey Harbour in Cornwall, then an important centre for trade. The harbour was reached through the Fowey estuary, which the local town had protected in the previous century with two blockhouses positioned along the river's edge—the Fowey and Polruan blockhouses—and a boom chain strung between them. The new castle replaced these and was located high on the headland overlooking the entrance to the estuary itself, St Catherine's Point, from which it took its name.

Construction work began on the castle at some point between 1538 and 1540, under the direction of a member of the local Cornish gentry, Thomas Treffry. By 1540, a map of the local defences described the castle as only "half-made"; when the antiquarian John Leland visited what he described as a blockhouse in 1542, he was hosted by Treffry, and afterwards recorded that the construction had been funded partly by Treffry and partly by the local town.

=== Later use ===
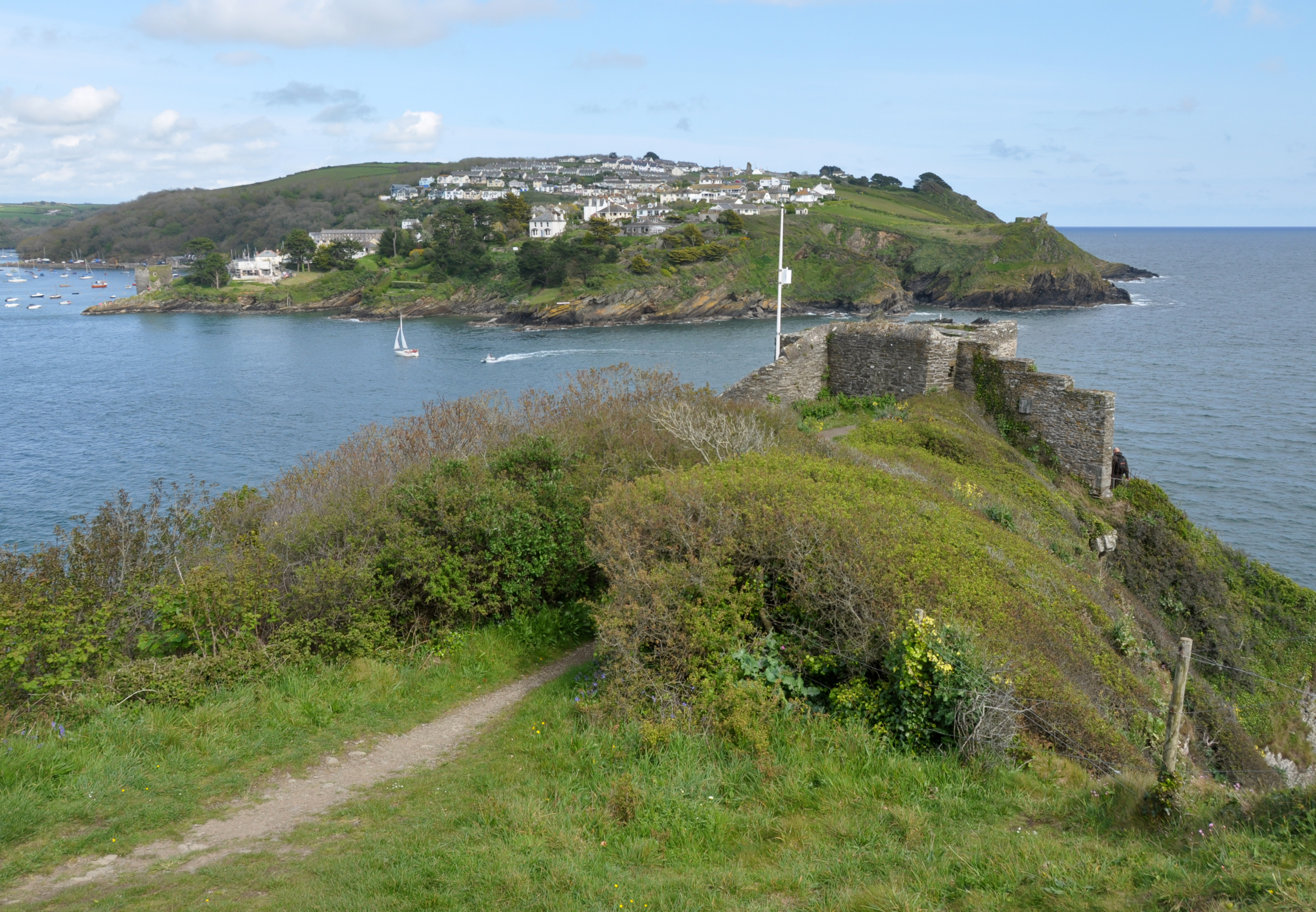
The castle overlooking the estuary and the sea; Polruan Blockhouse can be seen on the far left

St Catherine's Castle remained in use for many years. During the English Civil War of the 1640s, it was held by the Royalist supporters of King Charles I against Parliament; in 1684 the local burgesses reported that the fortification was in a "runious" state. The antiquarian Francis Grose visited the castle in 1786 and noted that the fortification was still being maintained at the expense of the local town. He praised its "picturesque and romantic" position but concluded that the building itself was of "little importance, either to antiquity or architecture". At this time the castle was equipped with six cannons and it continued to be used as a battery until the end of the Napoleonic Wars in 1815.

After the Crimean War broke out in 1853, fresh concerns of invasion were raised and the coastline was refortified. The castle was redeveloped as part of this work in 1855, and two new gun positions built around the old blockhouse. In 1887, the castle was equipped with 64-pound (29 kg) rifled, muzzle-loading artillery pieces, supported by volunteer forces and used for training purposes, but the weaponry became obsolete and the site had fallen out of use again by the end of the century.

The castle was brought back into use in the Second World War by the British Southern Command to defend the coast against German attack. In June 1940 it was re-equipped as a gun battery and observation post, with additional concrete defences laid around the position. Two 4.7-inch (120 mm) naval guns were installed in one of the 19th century firing positions and in a new gun position built 50 metres (160 ft) to the west of the castle; these were supplemented by a French 75-millimetre (3.0 in) gun, and the old blockhouse itself was used to control a minefield in the estuary below. The guns were manned first by the 364 Coast Battery of the Royal Artillery and then by the 379 Battery of the 557 Coast Regiment, but the battery was retired from active operations in November 1943. After 1945 the entire fort was decommissioned and the newer defences removed.

In the 21st century, the castle is operated by the heritage organisation English Heritage as a tourist attraction and is protected under UK law as a Grade II* listed building and scheduled monument.

== Architecture ==
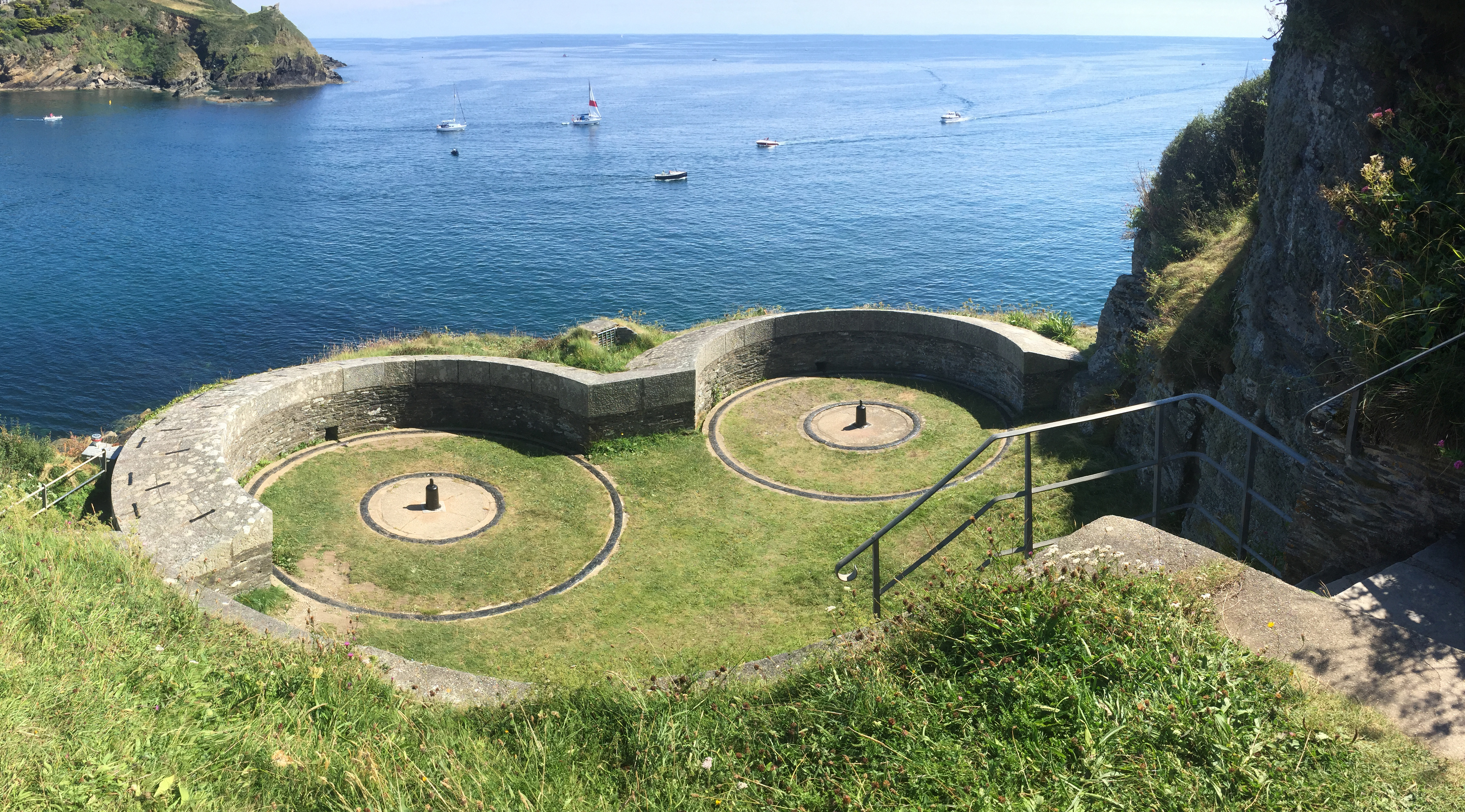
19th-century gun platforms

The 16th century blockhouse is a two-storey, D-shaped design, 5 by 4.4 metres (16 by 14 ft) internally, with walls of slate rubble up to 1.35 metres (4 ft 5 in) thick resting on a platform cut out of the bedrock. The ground floor originally had three semi-circular gun-ports overlooking the sea and the estuary, although one has since been blocked up. On the first floor were two more gun-ports—one now filled in—and smaller windows that could have been used for smaller gunpowder weapons. The building had a fireplace and chimney, with a small guard chamber by the entrance, and was topped by a parapet walk.

The blockhouse overlooks the sea and the estuary from its position on a rocky outcrop. It is surrounded by cliffs and a curtain wall, enclosing a semi-circular area around 500 square metres (5,400 sq ft) in size, incorporating slits for firing muskets. A rectangular bastion, 5.7 by 3.2 metres (19 by 10 ft) internally with 0.75 metres (2 ft 6 in) thick walls, protects the rear of the blockhouse. The original pathway to the blockhouse was blocked by later work, and the current steps up to the building are of 19th century origin.

A flat-roofed magazine was cut out of the rock just below the blockhouse in the 19th century, and a gun platform with two circular recesses for gun carriage rails was constructed, protected by a granite parapet. The curtain wall was reworked in this period and marked by plaques labelled "WD 1855". The recesses and marks from the additional defences in the Second War can still be seen in places along the gun platform.

== Bibliography ==
- Chandler, John (1996). "John Leland in the West Country". In Brayshay, Mark (ed.). Topographical Writers in South-West England. Exeter, UK: University of Exeter Press. pp. 34–49. ISBN 9780859894241.
- Grose, Francis (1787). Supplement to the Antiquities of England and Wales. Vol. 8. London, UK: S. Hooper. OCLC 861232358.
- Hale, J. R. (1983). Renaissance War Studies. London, UK: Hambledon Press. ISBN 0907628176.
- Harrington, Peter (2007). The Castles of Henry VIII. Oxford, UK: Osprey Publishing. ISBN 9781472803801.
- King, D. J. Cathcart (1991). The Castle in England and Wales: An Interpretative History. London, UK: Routledge Press. ISBN 9780415003506.
- Leland, John (1907). Smith, Lucy Toumlin (ed.). The Itinerary of John Leland in or About the Years 1535–1543. Vol. 1. London, UK: George Bell and Sons. OCLC 2858987.
- Morley, B. M. (1976). Henry VIII and the Development of Coastal Defence. London, UK: Her Majesty's Stationery Office. ISBN 0116707771.
- Pettifer, Adrian (2002). English Castles: A Guide by Counties. Woodbridge, UK: Boydell Press. ISBN 978-0-85115-782-5.
- Thompson, M. W. (1987). The Decline of the Castle. Cambridge, UK: Cambridge University Press. ISBN 1854226088.
