= Alexander Duroure =

British Army general

Lieutenant-General Alexander Duroure
- Born: 1692; London, Kingdom of England
- Died: 1765 (aged 72–73); Toulouse, France
- Burial place: Westminster Abbey
- Spouse: Louisa Bruchell
- Military career
- Allegiance: Kingdom of Great Britain
- Branch: British Army
- Rank: Lieutenant-General
- Conflicts: War of Jenkins' Ear; Jacobite rising

Lieutenant-General Alexander Duroure (c. 1692 – 1 February 1765) was a British Army officer who served as colonel of the 4th (King's Own) Regiment of Foot.

He was of Huguenot extraction, the son of Francis Du Roure, a French immigrant who had served in Ireland, and his wife Catherine Rieutort and was the brother of Colonel Scipio Duroure.

Duroure was commissioned as a lieutenant in the 10th Regiment of Foot in 1715. He took part in the first attack on Cartagena de Indias in March 1740 during the War of Jenkins' Ear and was deployed with a contingent of 500 men to assist James Oglethorpe in securing the Carolinas in 1742. He became Quartermaster General to Field Marshal George Wade at Newcastle upon Tyne in 1745 during the Jacobite rising and Governor of St Mawes Castle later that year. He was deployed to Scotland with reinforcements in 1746 and commanded the 38th Regiment of Foot in Antigua in 1752. He was also colonel of the 4th (King's Own) Regiment of Foot (1756–65).

He died in France in 1765 and was buried in Westminster Abbey, where his memorial reads "Alexander Duroure Esqr. Lieutenant General of the British forces, Colonel of the Fourth or Kings Own Regiment of Foot and Captain or Keeper of His Majesty's Castle of St Maws in Cornwall who after 57 years faithful service died at Toulouse in France on the 2nd day of January 1765 aged 73 years, and lies interred in this cloyster." He had married Louisa Bruchell but had no children.

Military offices
Preceded by Sir Robert Rich, 5th Baronet	Colonel of the 4th (The King's Own) Regiment of Foot; 1756–1765	Succeeded by Robert Brudenell
Preceded by Richard Philipps	Colonel of the 38th Regiment of Foot; 1751–1756	Succeeded by Sir James Ross, Bt.
