= Clara Coltman Rogers Vyvyan =

Australian-born travel writer

Clara Coltman Vyvyan (née Rogers; 1885 – 1 March 1976) was an Australian-born travel writer. She published under the names C. C. Rogers and C. C. Vyvyan.

== Biography ==
Vyvyan was born in 1885 on her family's cattle station in Stanage, Queensland, Australia. Her mother Charlotte Williams was from Cornwall, England, and her father, Edward Powys Rogers, was a member of the Coltman Rogers family of Stanage Park in Powys, Wales. In 1887 the family returned to live in Cornwall, although they continued to spend 6 months a year in Queensland; Vyvyan and her sister were educated by a governess at home. Vyvyan later studied at the Women's University Settlement in London, England, and became a social worker.

During World War I, Vyvyan served as a nurse at Rouen, France. After the war ended, she travelled across Canada and Alaska, writing articles for publication.

In 1929, Vyvyan became the second wife of Sir Courtenay Bourchier Vyvyan, the 10th Vyvyan baronet. When he died 12 years later, she inherited Trelowarren estate and house. Her close friend Daphne du Maurier used the house and gardens as settings for her novels Frenchman's Creek and Rebecca.

Both lovers of travel and the great outdoors, Vyvyan set off on a three-month walk with du Maurier in 1952 along the Rhône river in France. Annabel Abbs retraced the pair's steps 70 years later in her book, Windswept: Walking in the Footsteps of Remarkable Women (Two Roads, 2021).

== Bibliography ==
- Rogers, C. C. (1924). Cornish Silhouettes. London: The Bodley Head.
  - "To M. L'E and J.T.K.T"
- Rogers, C. C. (1926). Echoes in Cornwall. London: The Bodley Head.
  - "My grateful thanks are due to A.E.W - W.M.W - A.M.T and A.W. who have so generously shared with me their memories"
- Vyvyan, C. C. (1931). Gwendra Cove, and other Cornish sketches. Truro: Jordan's Bookshop. - Anecdotes
  - "To my dear Nell (Nellie Cyril Faudel-Phillips) who died in 1928 on May 23rd"
- Vyvyan, C. C. (1933). Bird Symphony: An anthology. London: John Murray.
  - "Dedicated to C. B. V. and all others who love birds"
- Vyvyan, C. C. (1936). Maria Pendragon. Dawlish: The Channing Press. - Anecdotes
  - "To Amabel - with love and gratitude for happy hours of laughter"
- Vyvyan, C. C. (1937). Cornish Cronies. Dawlish: The Channing Press. - Anecdotes
- Vyvyan, C. C. (1948). Our Cornwall, with drawings by Elizabeth Rivers. London: Westaway Books.
  - "To Rosemary - To remember and recapture Happy Days"
- Vyvyan, C. C. (1949) 'The House that Listened' - article in The Cornish Review (Spring)
- Vyvyan, C. C. (1950). 'J.C. Tregarthen' - article in The Cornish Review (Spring)
- Vyvyan, C. C. (1952). The Dead Smile. London: Carroll & Nicholson. - Novel
- Vyvyan, C. C. (1952/1974) The Old Place. Illustrated by Elizabeth Rivers. London: Museum Press.
- Vyvyan, C. C. (1953/1954/1956/1960). The Scilly Isles. London: Robert Hale.
- Vyvyan, C. C. (1955). Down the Rhône on Foot. London: Peter Owen.
  - "Dedicated to my good companions of the Rhone - Foy Quiller Couch, Daphne du Maurier, Oenone Johnson"
- Vyvyan, C. C. (1955). Temples and Flowers: A journey to Greece. London: Peter Owen. - Travels in Greece
  - "Dedicated to my good companion Daphne"
- Vyvyan, C. C. (1956). The Helford River. London: Peter Owen PDF ebook
  - "This book is for Anne"
- Vyvyan, C. C. (1957). On Timeless Shores: Journeys in Ireland. London: Peter Owen. - Travels in Ireland
  - "Dedicated to The Wanderer Pomus and Anne"
- Vyvyan, C. C. (1958 Peter Owen/1959 Country Book Club). A Cornish Year. London: Country Book Club.
  - "Dedicated to Fluminetta"
- Vyvyan, C. C. (1960). Random Journeys. London: Peter Owen. - Travelogues
- Vyvyan, C. C. (1961). Arctic Adventure. London: Peter Owen. - Travel to the Arctic
- Vyvyan, C. C. (1962/1963). Roots and Stars: Reflections on the past. London: Country Book Club. - Autobiography
- Vyvyan, C. C. (1964/1965). Coloured Pebbles. London: Country Book Club.
- Vyvyan, C. C. (1966). Journey up the Years. London: Peter Owen. - Autobiography
  - "Dedicated with deep gratitude to Oenone and Anne Treffry and Alethea Garstin who helped me finish this book"
- Vyvyan, C. C. (1967). Nothing Venture. London: Peter Owen. - Travels in California
  - "Dedicated to the faithful Leonore"
- Vyvyan, C. C. (1972). Letters from a Cornish Garden. London: Michael Joseph. - with Foreword by Daphne du Maurier
- Vyvyan, Clara (1998). The ladies, the Gwich'in, and the Rat: travels on the Athabasca, Mackenzie, Rat, Porcupine, and Yukon rivers in 1926, Edmonton, University of Alberta Press
- Vyvyan, C. C. (n.d.) Amateur Gardening: For Pleasure and Profit. London: Museum Press.

== See also ==
Vyvyan family [The extraordinary untold story of Lady Clara Vyvyan]
