= George Parry (MP) =

Sir George Parry (1600–1660) was an English lawyer and politician who sat in the House of Commons of England from 1640 until 1644.

Parry was probably the son of Henry Parry, Bishop of Worcester and matriculated at Merton College, Oxford on 14 March 1617 aged 16. He was admitted at the Inner Temple in 1616 and was awarded BA at Oxford in 1619. He became a Fellow at Cambridge in 1619 and was awarded LLd from Magdalene College, Cambridge in 1628. He was admitted advocate on 3 November 1628 and became Recorder of Exeter.

In April 1640, Parry was elected Member of Parliament for St Mawes for the Short Parliament and was returned in November for the Long Parliament. Parry supported King Charles I and was knighted on 12 May 1644. He was disabled from Parliament in the same year.

Parry later lived in the City of London and died around 1670, as administration was then granted to his son Suetonius.

Parliament of England
Vacant Parliament suspended since 1629	Member of Parliament for St Mawes; 1640–1644; With: James Sheffield 1640; Richard Erisey	Succeeded by William Priestley; Richard Erisey
