= Sir Richard Vyvyan, 1st Baronet =

English baronet and politician

Sir Richard Vyvyan, 1st Baronet (c. 1613 – 3 October 1665) was an English politician who sat in the House of Commons at various times between 1640 and 1665. He supported the Royalist cause in the English Civil War.

== Biography ==
Vyvyan was the eldest son of Sir Francis Vyvyan (1575–1635), head of one of Cornwall's leading families who had been both a member of parliament and High Sheriff of Cornwall. He was of Trelowarren, Cornwall, when he was knighted at Whitehall on 1 March 1636, shortly after his father's death.

In April 1640, Vyvyan was elected Member of Parliament for Penryn in the Short Parliament. He was elected MP for Tregony for the Long Parliament in November 1640. He supported the King in the Civil War and joined the King's Parliament at Oxford rather than remaining at Westminster. He established a Royalist mint in Truro in 1642-43 and was Master of the Mint there and when it was moved to Exeter in September 1643. He was disabled from sitting in the House of Commons in January 1644. King Charles rewarded him for his loyalty by creating him a baronet on 12 February 1645. He was subsequently fined £600 and had his estate sequestrated.

After the Restoration, Vyvyan returned once more to public life. He stood for as MP for St Mawes for the Cavalier Parliament in 1661 but was excluded in a double return. He was later elected MP for St Mawes in a by-election in 1663 and sat until his death in 1665.

Vyvyan married Mary Bulteel, and was succeeded in the baronetcy by their eldest son, Vyell.

Parliament of England
| Preceded by William Killigrew; Sir Thomas Edmunds | Member of Parliament for Penryn; 1640; With: Joseph Hall | Succeeded by Sir Nicholas Slanning; John Bampfylde |
| Preceded by John St Aubyn; Sir John Arundell | Member of Parliament for Tregony; 1640–1644; With: John Polwhele | Vacant Title next held by John Carew; Sir Thomas Trevor |
| Preceded by Arthur Spry; Sir William Tredenham | Member of Parliament for St Mawes; 1663–1665; With: Arthur Spry | Succeeded by Arthur Spry; Joseph Tredenham |
Baronetage of England
| New creation | Baronet (of Trelowarren); 1645–1665 | Succeeded by Vyell Vyvyan |
