= Commissioners of Audit =

British public officials (1785–1866)

The Commissioners of Audit had responsibility from 1785 to 1866 for the auditing of public accounts in the United Kingdom.

== History ==
In 1785 a Commission for Auditing the Public Accounts was established by statute, replacing the Auditors of the Imprest. Its members, the Commissioners of Audit, were five in number: three were appointed by letters patent, the other two were the Comptrollers of Army Accounts, who served ex officio. (Comptrollers of Army Accounts had first been appointed in 1703, to audit the accounts of all Army regiments and paymasters; their office was later abolished, in 1835, whereupon their duties were taken over by the Commissioners of Audit.)

In 1806 the Commission was reconstituted with ten commissioners (no longer incorporating the ex officio members). Over ensuing decades the size of the Commission gradually decreased as departing members were not always replaced. Under the terms of the Exchequer and Audit Departments Act 1866, the offices of the Comptroller of the Exchequer and the Commissioners of Audit were merged and their duties vested in a new official: the Comptroller and Auditor General. His office, the Exchequer and Audit Department, was reconstituted in 1984 as the National Audit Office.

== List of commissioners ==
From	To	Name	Notes
1785	1799	Sir William Musgrave	
1785	1806	John Thomas Batt	
1785	1805	John Martin Leake	ex officio from 1794
1785	1802	Sir John Dick	ex officio
1785	1794	William Molleson	ex officio
1794	1799	William Chamberlayne	
1799	1802	Reginald Pole Carew	
1800	1806	Sir Charles William Rouse Boughton	
1802	1805	John Erskine	ex officio
1802	1806	The Hon. Bartholomew Bouverie	
1806	1821	William Mackworth Praed (lawyer)	Chairman of the Commissioners, 1806-1821
1806	1818	Francis Perceval Eliot	Previously an 'Additional Commissioner' 1805-1806
1806	1822	Richard Dawkins	Previously an 'Additional Commissioner' 1805-1806
1806	1810	Charles Moore	Previously an 'Additional Commissioner' 1805-1806
1806	1821	John Sargent	
1806	1819	John Anstey	
1806	1836	John Whishaw	
1806	1813	Philip Deare	
1806	1809	Lewis Jenkins	
1821	1827	The Hon. Edward Richard Stewart	Chairman of the Commissioners, 1821-1827
1821	1823	George Jenkinson	
1821	1823	Francis Seymour Larpent	(later reappointed as chairman)
1821	1826	John Thornton	
1822	1849	Henry Fownes Luttrell	
1822	1835	James Chapman	
1824	1848	Sir John Osborn	
1826	1865	Henry Arbuthnot	
1827	1843	Francis Seymour Larpent	Chairman of the Commissioners, 1827-1843
1835	1854	Sir William Lewis Herries	Chairman of the Commissioners, 1843-1854
1836	1865	Edward Romilly	Chairman of the Commissioners, 1854-1865
1843	1854	Sir Alexander Cray Grant	
1849	1860	Charles Ross	
1849	1867	Richard Vaughan Davis	
1854	1867	William Leader Maberley	
1865	1867	Sir William Dunbar	Chairman of the Commissioners, 1865-1867; then appointed Comptroller and Auditor General
1865	1867	Charles Zachary Macaulay	
1867	1867	William George Anderson	Appointed Assistant Comptroller and Auditor General in 1867
