= Edmund Sexton =

English politician (died c. 1859)

Edmund Sexton (died c. 1589), of Westminster and Uxbridge, Middlesex, was an English Member of Parliament (MP).

He was a Member of the Parliament of England for St. Mawes in 1563.

Parliament of England
Preceded by unknown unknown	Member of Parliament for St. Mawes; 1563; With: Oliver Carminow	Succeeded by William Fleetwood; Israel Amice
