= Comptrollers of Army Accounts =

Comptrollers of Army Accounts were British public officials first appointed on 10 June 1703, by the Lord High Treasurer, Lord Godolphin; there were two Comptrollers (assisted by a Secretary and eight clerks). Initially under the authority of the Commander-in-Chief, they were instead made accountable to the Treasury in 1708.

== Role ==
The Comptrollers were established to audit the accounts of all army Paymasters and regiments, to keep an account of all weapons, tents and provisions issued to each regiment (to ensure that each regiment was duly charged for what it received) and to inspect all muster rolls. To begin with, they also had responsibility for inspecting the clothing contracts entered into by each regiment but in 1708 this duty was handed over to a separate Clothing Board established under the Board of General Officers.

In 1783 the role of the Comptrollers was extended, to cover 'the examination of the Provision and Store accounts of the Commissariat Department'.

In 1785 the two Comptrollers of Army Accounts were made ex officio members of the new Audit Board (the Commissioners for Auditing Public Accounts). In 1806 the Comptrollers were separated from the Audit Board; their responsibilities and powers were again extended and a third Comptroller was appointed (however, when he died in office in 1830, he was not replaced). By 1833 they were described as: "Comptrollers of all extraordinary military expenditure (except that connected with the Ordnance department) and auditors of the provision and store accounts of all Commissariat and other officers in charge of stores (except ordnance) on foreign service".

== Demise ==
In 1835 the office of the Comptrollers of Army Accounts was dissolved and its responsibilities given to the Commissioners of Audit.

== List of comptrollers ==
From	To	Name	Notes
1703	1707	Sir Joseph Tredenham	
1703	1704	William Duncombe	
1704	1708	Arthur Moore	
1708	1756	Sir Philip Meadows	
1708	1711	Thomas Brodrick	
1711	1730	The Hon. James Bruce	
1730	1747	Alan Brodrick, 2nd Viscount Midleton	
1747	1776	Stephen Fox, 1st Baron Ilchester	created Earl of Ilchester 17 June 1756
1756	1775	James Cresset	
1775	1783	Henry Bunbury	
1776	1780	Thomas Bowlby	
1780	1780	Christopher D'Oyly	(appointment gazetted but declined)
1780	1802	Sir John Dick	Ex officio Commissioner of Audit from 1785
1783	1794	William Molleson	Ex officio Commissioner of Audit from 1785
1794	1811	John Martin Leake	Ex officio Commissioner of Audit until 1805
1802	1817	John Erskine	Ex officio Commissioner of Audit until 1805
1806	1830	John King	
September 1811	October 1811	John Charles Herries	
1811	1835	Colonel John Drinkwater	
1815	1823	Anthony Rosenhagen	Member of the Board from 1817
1823	1826	The Hon. James Henry Keith Stewart	
1826	1835	Lt-Col Sir William Lewis Herries KCH	
