= William Hockmore =

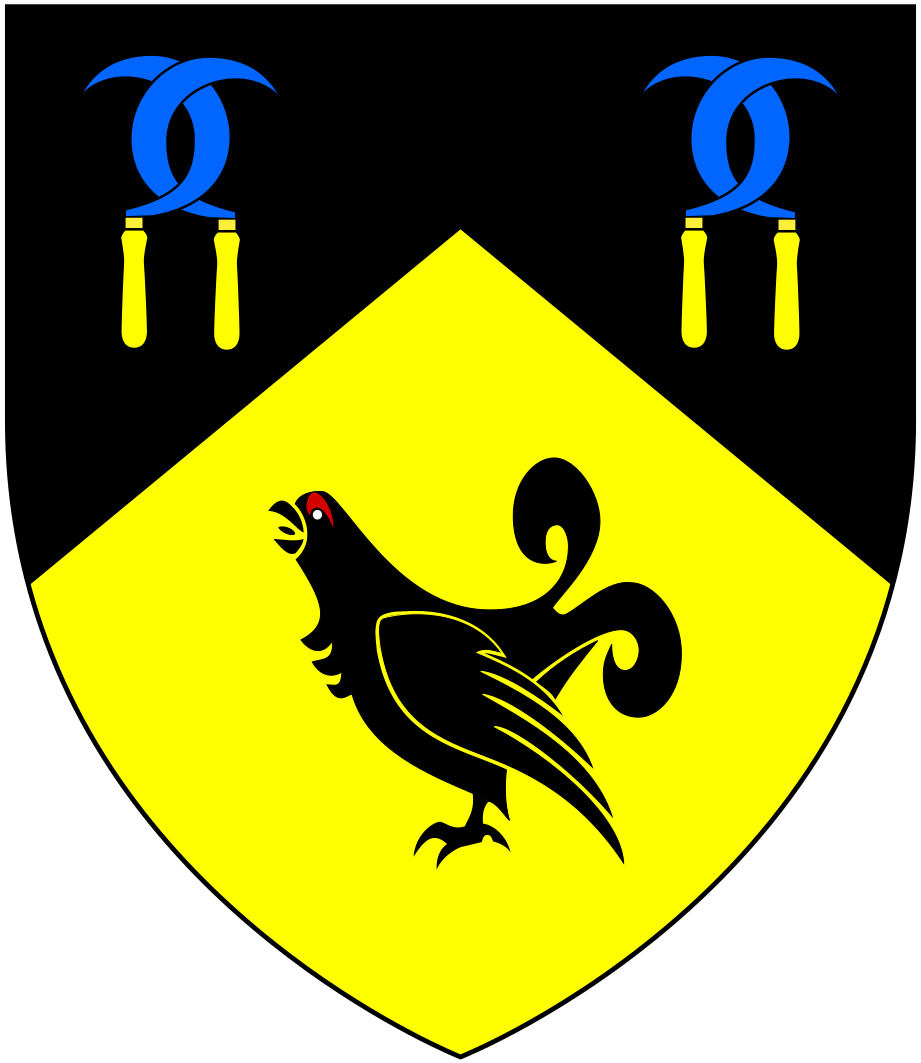
Arms of Hockmore: Per chevron sable and or, in chief two pairs of reaping hooks endorsed and entwined blades azure handles of the second in base a moorcock of the first combed and wattled gules

William Hockmore (1 November 1581 – 10 October 1626) of Buckland Baron in the parish of Combe-in-Teignhead, Devon, England, was a lawyer who served twice as a Member of Parliament for St Mawes in Cornwall, in 1621 and 1624.

== Origins ==
Hockmore was the son and heir of John Hockmore of Buckland Baron by his wife Mary Floyer, a daughter of William Floyer of Floyer Hayes in the parish of St Thomas on the southern side of the City of Exeter in Devon.

== Career ==
He matriculated at Corpus Christi College, Oxford on 23 July 1596, aged 14 and was called to the bar at the Middle Temple in 1610. In 1621 he was elected a Member of Parliament for St Mawes in Cornwall and was re-elected in 1624 for the Happy Parliament.

== Marriage and children ==
He married Jane Michell, a daughter and co-heiress of Sir Bartholomew Michell of Cannington, Somerset, by whom he had 3 sons and 2 daughters.

== Death ==
Hockmore died in 1626 at the age of 44. His monument survives in Combe-in-Teignhead Church.

Parliament of England
Preceded by Francis Vyvyan; Sir Nicholas Smith	Member of Parliament for St Mawes; 1621–1624; With: Edward Wrightington 1621–1622; John Arundell 1624	Succeeded by Sir James Fullerton; Nathaniel Tomkins
