= Scipio Duroure =

Colonel Scipio Duroure (died 10 May 1745) was a British Army officer who was Adjutant-General of the British Army and Colonel of the 12th Regiment of Foot.

He was of Huguenot extraction, the son of Francis Du Roure, a French immigrant who had served in Ireland, and his wife Catherine Rieutort and the brother of General Alexander Duroure.

He joined the British Army in December 1705 and served for many years in the 12th Regiment of Foot (later the Suffolk Regiment) in which he was promoted Lieutenant-Colonel in August 1734. He was appointed Captain and Keeper of St Mawes Castle near Falmouth, Cornwall, guarding the entrance to Carrick Roads. He also served for 14 years in Scotland as a brigade major and was promoted Colonel of the Regiment in 1741.

He fought in the battles of Hockstead, Ramillies, Oudenarde and Malplaquet. He led his regiment in person at the Battle of Dettingen in 1743, but was killed by a cannonball at the Battle of Fontenoy in 1745.

He had married in 1713 Margueritte de Vignoles and had at least a son, Francis.

A monument to Duroure and his brother exists in Westminster Abbey. Duroure's inscription reads "Scipio Duroure Esqr. Adjutant General of the British forces, Colonel of the Twelfth Regiment of Foot, and Captain or Keeper of His Majesty's Castle of St Maws in Cornwall, who after forty one years faithfull service was mortally wounded at the battle of Fontenoy and died on the 10th day of May in the year 1745, aged 56 years and lies interred on the ramparts of Aeth in the Low Countries."

The motto "Stabilis" ("steady") on the Regiment's colours was suggested by the Duroure family motto.

Military offices
Preceded by Thomas Whetham	Colonel of the Duroure's Regiment of Foot; 1741–1745	Succeeded by Henry Skelton
