= Francis Scobell =

English politician (1664–1740)

Francis Scobell (1664 – 20 September 1740) was an English politician affiliated with the Tories. He was a member of parliament (MP) for Mitchell from 1690 to 1695, Grampound from 16 January 1699 to 1708, St. Germans from 1708 to 1710, Launceston from 1710 to 1713, and St. Mawes from 1713 to 1715.

== Family and education ==
He was baptised on 24 August 1664. He was the first son of Richard Scobell and Barbara, the daughter of Henry Carlyon. He was educated at the Middle Temple in 1681 and called to the bar in 1688. After 1704, he married Mary, the daughter of Sir Joseph Tredenham and had one son and two daughters.

== Political career ==
In 1690, he was elected MP for Mitchell. On 14 December 1692, he spoke against the Oath of Abjuration against James II.

In October 1694, he prevented Charles Mohun, 4th Baron Mohun from killing a coachman in Pall Mall. Mohun had begun assaulting the coachmen when Scobell intervened to stop him. Mohun reacted furiously to this interference and drew his sword, cutting Scobell on the head. Afterwards, Mohun sent Scobell a formal challenge to a duel but the duel never actually took place.

In 1695 and 1698, he did not stand for Parliament.

In January 1699, he was elected MP for Grampound and served in the next four parliaments. On 6 March 1699, he quarrelled with Sir William St Quintin, 3rd Baronet during a committee hearing. On 8 March 1702, he was named to draft the address to Queen Anne on her accession. On 18 March 1702, he was elected to the commission of accounts with 188 votes. On 13 February 1703, he voted against the Lords' amendments to the adjuration oath bill. On 28 November 1704, he voted for the Occasional Conformity Act 1711. In 1708, he moved from Grampound to St Germans and was elected the MP for that constituency.

On 12 January 1709, he supported Robert Harley on war strategy in Spain. On 17 January 1709, he introduced a bill to prevent electoral bribery. In 1710, he voted against the impeachment of Dr. Henry Sacheverell. In the 1710 election, he switched his seat to Launceston. He was returned to Parliament on 15 March 1712 and returned for St Mawes in the 1713 election. After the ascension of George I, he was removed from office and stood again unsuccessfully for St Mawes.

== Death ==
He died on 20 September 1740 and was buried at St Ewe, Cornwall.
