= James Sheffield, Lord Sheffield =

James Sheffield, Lord Sheffield (fl. 1640) was an English politician who sat in the House of Commons of England in 1640. He supported the Parliamentary cause in the English Civil War.

Sheffield was the son of Edmund Sheffield and his wife Mariana Irwin. When his father became Earl of Mulgrave, he received the courtesy title Lord Sheffield. He died before his father and the title went to his nephew, Edmund Sheffield, 2nd Earl of Mulgrave.

In April 1640, Sheffield was elected Member of Parliament for St Mawes in the Short Parliament. In 1642 he was a captain in the parliamentarian army of the Earl of Essex, and in 1645 a Colonel in the New Model Army.

Parliament of England
Vacant Parliament suspended since 1629	Member of Parliament for St Mawes; 1640; With: George Parry	Succeeded by George Parry; Richard Erisey
