= Nicholas Smith (MP) =

English lawyer, landowner and Gentleman of the Privy Chamber

Sir Nicholas Smith (July 1575 – 1622), of Exeter, Devon, was an English lawyer, landowner and Gentleman of the Privy Chamber.

He attended Oxford University. He was knighted at James I's coronation in 1603. He was a Member of Parliament for St Mawes in 1614.

Parliament of England
Preceded by John Speccott	Member of Parliament for St Mawes; 1614; With: Francis Vyvyan	Succeeded by William Hockmore
