= Francis Vyvyan =

English Member of Parliament

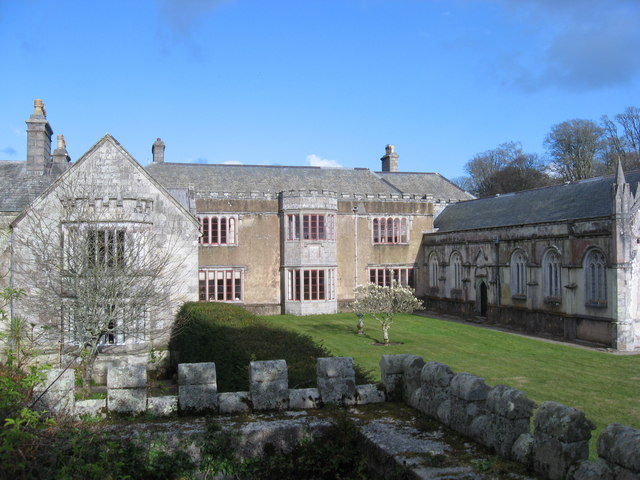
Trelowarren House - seat of the Vyvyan family

Sir Francis Vyvyan (Aug. 1575 – 11 June 1635), of Trelowarren in Cornwall, was an English Member of Parliament (MP); his surname is sometimes spelt Vivian.

The eldest son of Hannibal Vyvyan, an MP, High Sheriff of Cornwall and Captain of St Mawes Castle, Francis became Captain of St Mawes Castle himself in 1603. He was MP for Fowey in the Blessed Parliament of 1604 and St Mawes in the Addled Parliament of 1614.

He was briefly Vice-Admiral for South Cornwall in 1607–08 after his father's retirement from that post, and served as High Sheriff of Cornwall in 1617. He was knighted in 1618. However, falling from favour, he was dismissed from the captaincy of St Mawes in 1632 and fined £2000.

He married twice. His eldest son by his second marriage to Loveday Connock, Richard, was knighted shortly before his father's death in 1635, and in 1645 was raised to the dignity of a baronetcy.

Parliament of England
Preceded by Carew Raleigh; William Courtney	Member of Parliament for Fowey; 1604; With: Henry Peter (MP)	Succeeded by Jonathan Rashleigh; Sir Edward Boys
Preceded by Dudley Carleton; John Speccott	Member of Parliament for St Mawes; 1614; With: Nicholas Smith (MP)	Succeeded by Edward Wrightington; William Hockmore
