= Israel Amice =

Member of the Parliament of England

Israel Amice (or Amyce, c.1548 - 1607) was an MP in Cornwall, representing St Mawes constituency. He was elected in the 1571 English general election but did not return to Parliament after the next election.

Amice produced a survey map of Castle Hedingham in 1592 at the request of Lord Burghley, who employed him at the time.

Parliament of England
Preceded by Oliver Carminow; Edmund Sexton	Member of Parliament for St Mawes; 1571; With: William Fleetwood	Succeeded by Rowland Hind; Geoffrey Gates
