= William Priestley (St Mawes MP) =

William Priestley (c.1594–1664) was a lawyer and member of the Long Parliament, the son of William Priestley (d.1620), a merchant tailor in the City of London.

Priestley was admitted to Sidney College, Cambridge, 18 April 1610, and was admitted to the Honourable Society of Gray's Inn, 4 August 1612. Following his father's death in 1620, Priestley inherited Camfield House in Essendon; then, in 1627, he acquired the manor of Bedwell Lowthes. The family lived in a house known as Wyldehelle or Weald Hill, on the border of Hatfield and Essendon.

Priestley was appointed High Sheriff of Hertfordshire in 1634. In 1647, during the Long Parliament, William Priestley was appointed as a Recruiter MP for St Mawes in Cornwall, to fill the vacancy caused by the expulsion of the Royalist Dr George Parry who had been expelled in January 1644. Priestley himself was cast out of the House, along with his colleague, the Parliamentarian Richard Erisey, during Pride's Purge, December 1648. William Priestley died 10 March 1663/4. There is a large monument to him, on the south aisle wall of the parish church.
