= John Anstey (poet) =

English poet and barrister

John Anstey (died 1819) was an English poet and barrister. He was the second son of Christopher Anstey, and was a barrister of Lincoln's Inn and a commissioner for auditing public accounts. Under the pseudonym of 'John Surrebutter,' he wrote a didactic poem in 1796, entitled 'The Pleader's Guide,' further described as 'containing the conduct of a suit at law, with the arguments of Counsellor Bother'um and Counsellor Bore'um, in an action between John-a-Gull and John-a-Gudgeon for [assault and battery at a late contested election.' It has a great deal of humour, though chiefly of a legal kind. Richard Porson is said to have known it by heart, and Lord Campbell quotes it in his 'Lives of the Justices.' John Anstey also edited his father's works in 1808.
