= Thomas Treffry (died 1564) =

16th-century English politician

Thomas Treffry (died 1564), of Place at Fowey, was a British businessman, administrator and politician from Cornwall.

== Origins ==
Born about 1490, he was the first son of Thomas Treffrey (died before 1510), of Place, and his wife Janet, daughter and heiress of William Dawe, who lived at Plymouth. The Treffry family had landholdings but their predominant interest was in businesses centred on the port of Fowey, of which they were the leading citizens.

== Career ==
By 1524 he had been appointed a tax collector for Cornwall and in 1529 was selected as the senior of the two MPs for the borough of Bodmin. He probably sat for Bodmin again in June 1536 and may well have represented the town in 1539 and 1542, the records, however, being lost.

His arrival on the national scene led to a court appointment as a Gentleman Usher of the Chamber by 1533. In that year he was made a justice of the peace for Cornwall and Collector of Customs for Plymouth and Fowey, giving up the latter post in 1541.

The south Cornish coast being vulnerable to attack from the sea, the government started building the artillery fort called St Mawes Castle, where he was named as Captain in 1541 and supervised the completion of the works. Not only did he have to meet part of the cost himself but for the war against France in 1544 had also to finance both a contingent of soldiers for the army and the equipping of a ship, the Falcon Lisle, for the navy. In addition he had to raise funds for ransoming his son, who had been taken prisoner by the enemy.

His fortunes took a turn for the worse when King Edward VI died in July 1553. After he attended a general meeting of Cornwall notables at which the Protestant Lady Jane Grey was proclaimed queen, he was stripped of his positions by the government of the Catholic successor, Queen Mary I. He lost St Mawes Castle, in which he had been living, and his seat on the commission of the peace. Although he remained a Protestant, the government did later give him some responsibilities for coastal defence.

It is possible he was one of the MPs elected for Cornwall in November 1554 but it may alternatively have been another Thomas Treffry, not a legitimate son of his, who had sat for Bodmin in 1545. When Mary was succeeded by the Protestant Queen Elizabeth I in 1558, he was restored to his position as a county magistrate.

He died on either 24 or 31 January 1564 and was buried in the church of Fowey, with a memorial also being erected in the church of St Kew.

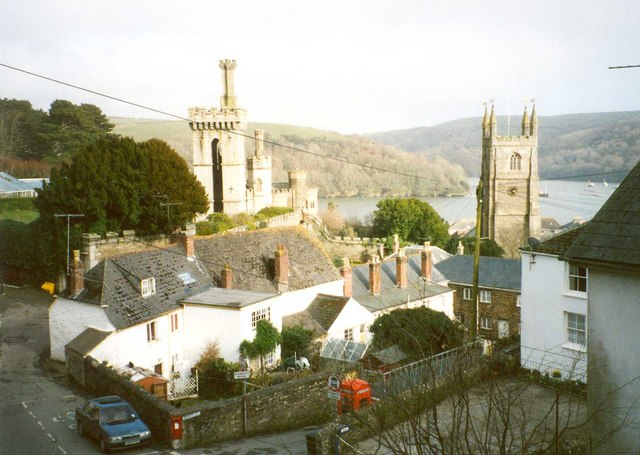
Place House and Fowey church

== Family ==
By a settlement dated 29 September 1505, he married Elizabeth, daughter of John II Killigrew (died 1536), of Penryn, and his wife Jane, daughter of John Petit, of Ardevora, and his wife Margaret Trenowyth.

Their son and heir was John (died 1590), who married first Jane, daughter of the MP Reginald Mohun and his wife Joan Trevanion, and secondly in 1558 Emmeline (died 1604), daughter of John Tresithney and his wife Joan Treffry. With Emmeline, John had (I) his heir William (born 1566), MP for Fowey, who married Ursula Tremaine; (II) Sarah (born 1568), who married Lewis Cruwys, of Cruwys Morchard; and (III) Martha (born 1572), who married Thomas Peter and was the mother of the regicide Hugh Peter.
