= Francis Godfrey =

English politician (1681–1712)

Francis Godfrey (1681 – 6 October 1712) was an English Whig politician and soldier who sat as Member of Parliament (MP) for St. Mawes from 1705 till 1710.

He was baptised on 15 June 1681 and was the oldest surviving son of Charles Godfrey, who also sat as MP. He never married.

== Military career ==
He followed his father in joining the army and was appointed cornet in the 6th Dragoon Guards in 1700. In 1703, he was promoted to captain and lieutenant-colonel in the 1st Regiment of Foot Guards. In 1705 till 1711, he served as colonel of the 16th Regiment of Foot. In 1710, he was promoted to brigadier-general.

== Parliamentary career ==
Francis Godfrey was elected in St. Mawes in 1705 with the support of his brother-in-law, Hugh Boscawen II. From 1706 till 1708 he served as groom of the bedchamber to Prince George of Denmark.

He died on 6 October 1712 and was buried in Canterbury Cathedral.
