= Arthur Spry =

Arthur Spry (4 February 1612 – 17 September 1685) was an English politician who sat in the House of Commons from 1660 to 1679.

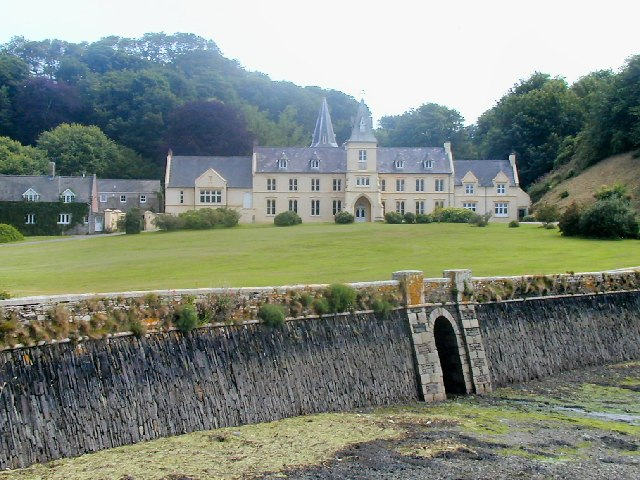
Place House

Spry was the son of Thomas Spry and his wife Catherine Ashford, daughter of Arthur Ashford. He was the first member of the family to settle at Place, a property granted to the Spry family by Henry VIII, in the parish of St Anthony in Roseland. In 1660, Spry was elected Member of Parliament for St Mawes in the Convention Parliament being seated after a double return in May 1660. In 1661 he was re-elected MP for St Mawes in another double return to the Cavalier Parliament and was seated in May. He sat until 1679.

Spry died at the age of 73 and was buried at St Anthony's where a monument was erected featuring a bust between two weeping females.

Spry married firstly Mary Gayer daughter of Richard Gayer. She died on 4 May 1656 and was buried at Anthony Church. He married secondly Luce Hele, daughter of George Hele. He had a son George and was grandfather of the admiral Richard Spry.
