= William Tredenham =

English politician

Sir William Tredenham (c. 1638 – 12 May 1662) of Tregonan, St Ewe, Cornwall was an English politician who sat in the House of Commons between 1659 and 1662.

Tredenham was the son of John Tredenham of Philleigh, Cornwall and his wife Elizabeth Molesworth, daughter of John Molesworth of Pencarrow, Cornwall. His younger brother was Sir Joseph Tredenham, MP. William was educated at Exeter College, Oxford and entered the Middle Temple in 1654.

In 1659, Tredenham was elected Member of Parliament for St Mawes in the Third Protectorate Parliament. He was re-elected MP for St Mawes in the Convention Parliament, being seated after a double return in May 1660. He was knighted on 25 July 1660. In 1661 he was re-elected MP for St Mawes in another double return and was seated in May. He sat until his death in 1662.

Tredenham died unmarried without issue and was buried in the church of St Clement Danes, London.
