= St Mawes (constituency) =

Parliamentary constituency in the United Kingdom

- Former borough constituency for the House of Commons
- County: Cornwall
- Major settlements: St Mawes

1562–1832
- Seats: Two
- Replaced by: West Cornwall

St Mawes was a rotten borough in Cornwall, England. It returned two Members of Parliament (MPs) to the House of Commons of England from 1562 to 1707, to the House of Commons of Great Britain from 1707 to 1800, and to the House of Commons of the United Kingdom until it was abolished by the Great Reform Act in 1832.

== History ==
The borough consisted of the manor of St Mawes, a decayed fishing port and market town in the west of Cornwall. Like most of the Cornish boroughs enfranchised or re-enfranchised during the Tudor period, it was a rotten borough from the start.

The right to vote rested with the portreeve and "resident burgesses or free tenants", making it essentially a scot and lot borough (there were 87 voters in 1831), but the control of the "patron" was entirely secure. In practice the patron always worked in close collusion with the Crown, and the members returned were generally court nominees throughout the borough's existence. In the 1760s the Boscawen family (the Viscounts Falmouth) were considered to have the main influence over the choice of one member and Robert Nugent over the other; by the time of the Great Reform Act, the patronage had passed to the Marquess of Buckingham.

In 1831, the borough had a population of 459, and 95 houses.

== Members of Parliament ==
=== 1562–1629 ===
Parliament	First member	Second member
Parliament of 1563–1567	Oliver Carminow	Edmund Sexton
Parliament of 1571	William Fleetwood	Israel Amice
Parliament of 1572–1581	Rowland Hind	Geoffrey Gates
Parliament of 1584–1585	William Onslow	Christopher Southouse
Parliament of 1586–1587	Sampson Lennard	Thomas Chaloner
Parliament of 1588–1589	John Potts	Walter Cope
Parliament of 1593	Nicholas Fuller	Henry Vincent
Parliament of 1597–1598	Michael Vyvyan	Richard Orver
Parliament of 1601	Robert Killigrew	Ralph Hare
Parliament of 1604–1611	Dudley Carleton	Sir John Speccot
Addled Parliament (1614)	Francis Vyvyan	Sir Nicholas Smith
Parliament of 1621–1622	Edward Wrightington	William Hockmore
Happy Parliament (1624–1625)	John Arundell	William Hockmore
Useless Parliament (1625)	Sir James Fullerton	Nathaniel Tomkins
Parliament of 1625–1626	Sir Henry Carey	William Carr
Parliament of 1628–1629	Thomas Carey	Hannibal Vyvyan
No Parliament summoned 1629–1640

=== 1640–1832 ===
Year	First member	First party	Second member	Second party
April 1640	Dr George Parry	Royalist	Lord Sheffield	Parliamentarian
November 1640	Dr George Parry	Royalist	Richard Erisey	Parliamentarian
January 1644	Parry disabled from sitting – seat vacant		Richard Erisey	Parliamentarian
1647	William Priestley		Richard Erisey	Parliamentarian
December 1648	Priestley and Erisey excluded in Pride's Purge – both seats vacant			
1653	St Mawes was unrepresented in the Barebones Parliament and the First and Second Parliaments of the Protectorate			
January 1659	William Tredenham		John Lampen	
May 1659	Not represented in the restored Rump			
April 1660	Sir William Tredenham		Arthur Spry	
1663	Sir Richard Vyvyan		Arthur Spry	
1665	Joseph Tredenham		Arthur Spry	
February 1679	Sidney Godolphin		Henry Seymour	
September 1679	Sir Joseph Tredenham		Henry Seymour	
1685	Sir Peter Prideaux		Henry Seymour	
1689	Sir Joseph Tredenham		Henry Seymour	
March 1690	Sir Joseph Tredenham		Henry Seymour Portman	
April 1690	Sir Joseph Tredenham		John Tredenham	
1695	Seymour Tredenham		John Tredenham	
1696	Henry Seymour Portman		John Tredenham	
1698	Sir Joseph Tredenham		John Tredenham	
1705	Sir Joseph Tredenham		Francis Godfrey	
1707	John Tredenham		Francis Godfrey	
1710	John Tredenham		Sir Richard Onslow	Whig
1711	John Anstis		Sir Richard Onslow	Whig
1713	Edward Rolt		Francis Scobell	Tory
1715	William Lowndes		John Chetwynd	
1722	Sidney Godolphin		Samuel Travers	
1726	Sidney Godolphin		Samuel Molyneux	
1727	Henry Vane	Whig	John Knight	Whig
1728	Henry Vane	Whig	William East	
1734	Henry Vane	Whig	Richard Plumer	
1741	Robert Nugent		James Douglas	
1747	Robert Nugent		The Lord Sundon	
1753	Robert Nugent		Sir Thomas Clavering	
April 1754	Robert Nugent		Henry Seymour Conway	Whig
December 1754	James Newsham		Henry Seymour Conway	Whig
1761	Edmund Nugent		Richard Hussey	
1768	Edmund Nugent		George Boscawen	
1770	Michael Byrne		George Boscawen	
1772	James Edward Colleton		George Boscawen	
1774	Viscount Clare		Hugh Boscawen	
1784	(Sir) William Young	Tory	Hugh Boscawen	
1790	(Sir) William Young	Tory	Colonel John Graves Simcoe	
1792	(Sir) William Young	Tory	Thomas Calvert	
1795	(Sir) William Young	Tory	William Drummond	
May 1796	(Sir) William Young	Tory	George Nugent	
October 1796	(Sir) William Young	Tory	Jeremiah Crutchley	
1802	(Sir) William Young	Tory	William Windham	Tory
1806	Sir John Newport	Whig	Scrope Bernard	Tory
January 1807	William Shipley		Scrope Bernard	Tory
July 1807	Viscount Ebrington	Whig	Scrope Bernard	Tory
1808	Viscount Ebrington	Whig	Earl Gower	Whig
1809	Scrope Bernard-Morland	Tory	Earl Gower	Whig
1812	Scrope Bernard-Morland	Tory	William Shipley	
1813	Scrope Bernard-Morland	Tory	Francis Horner	Whig
1817	Scrope Bernard-Morland	Tory	Joseph Phillimore	Tory
1826	Scrope Bernard-Morland	Tory	Sir Codrington Carrington	Tory
1830	George Pigott	Tory	Sir Codrington Carrington	Tory
1831	George Pigott	Tory	Sir Edward Sugden	Tory
1832	Constituency abolished			
