= Mawgan-in-Meneage =

Civil parish in Cornwall, England

Coordinates: 50.080°N 5.206°W

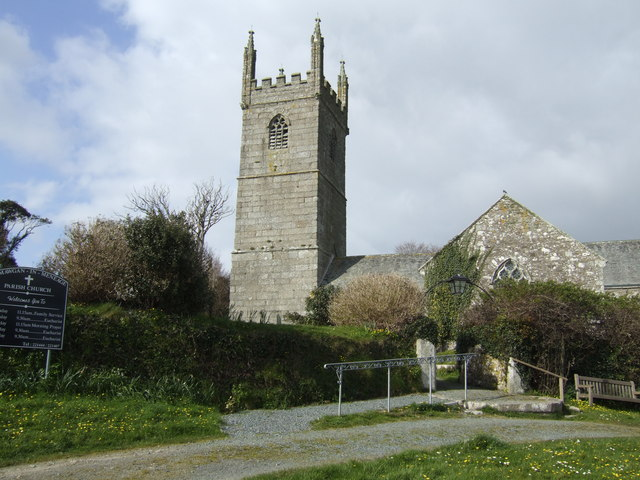
- St Mawgan-in-Meneage church

- Location within Cornwall
- Population: 1,437 (2011 census)
- OS grid reference: SW707249
- Civil parish: Mawgan-in-Meneage
- Unitary authority: Cornwall
- Shire county: Cornwall
- Region: South West
- Country: England
- Sovereign state: United Kingdom
- Police: Devon and Cornwall
- Fire: Cornwall
- Ambulance: South Western
- UK Parliament: St Ives
- Website: Parish Council

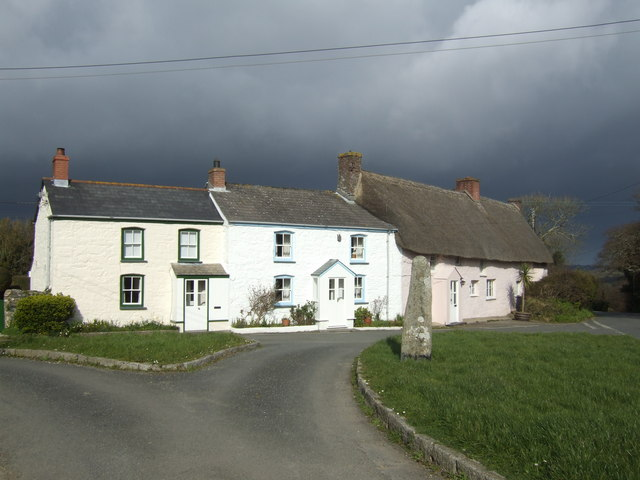
Mawgan Cross; with stone cross by the roadside

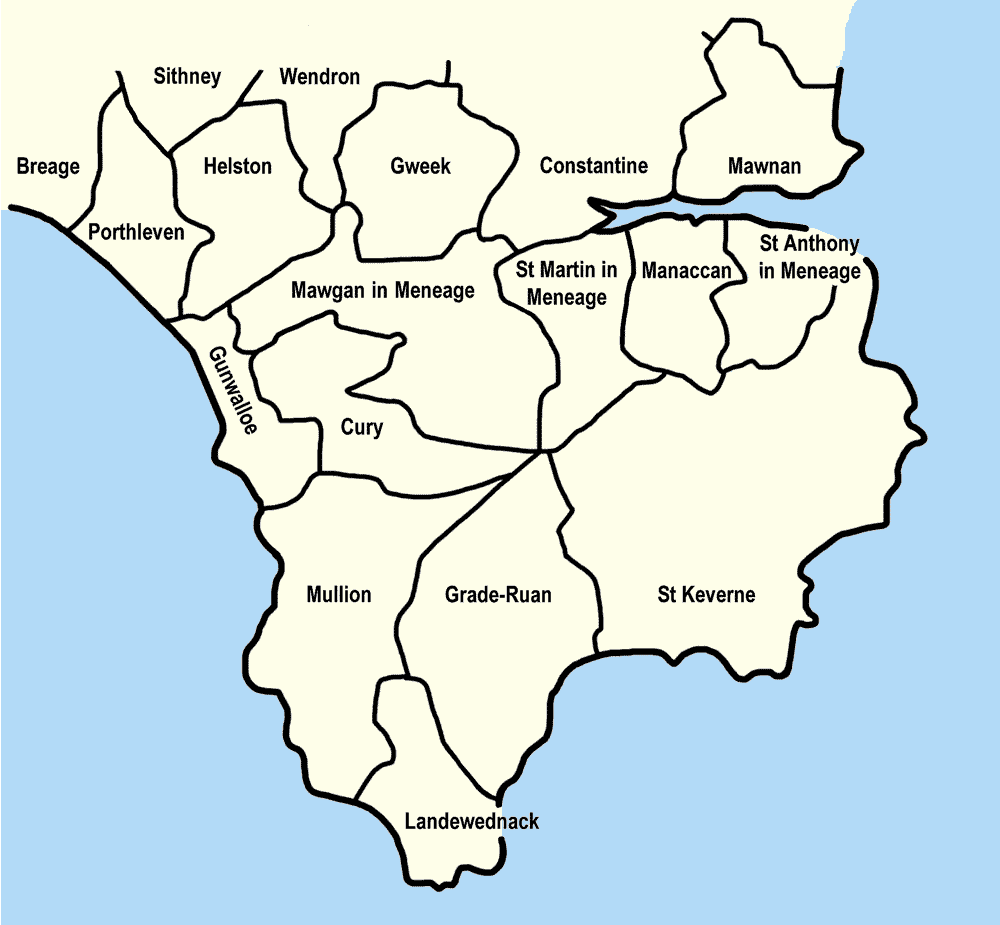
Mawgan-in-Meneage in relation to neighbouring parishes

Mawgan-in-Meneage is a village and civil parish in Cornwall, England. It is within the Meneage district of The Lizard peninsula, south of Helston, in the former administrative district of Kerrier. Mawgan-in-Meneage lies within the Cornwall National Landscape. The parish population at the 2011 census was 1437.

The parish includes the village of Garras.

== Antiquities ==
Evidence of early medieval habitation at Mawgan is in the form of an inscribed pillar stone, standing at the meeting of three roads at the centre of the village; it bears an inscription that is no longer readable, but based on an old drawing and a photograph taken in 1936 it could have been a memorial stone to either 'Cnegumus son of Genaius' or 'Genaius son of Cnegumus'. The date of this inscription is not certain beyond having been carved before the twelfth century. This is a Hiberno-Saxon inscribed stone which originally had a cross head.

== History ==
The name of the manor was given as "scanctus [sic] mawgan" after the dedication of the church, in the Domesday Book.

The parish church is dedicated to St Mauganus, a Welshman, who is also honoured at Mawgan-in-Pydar and in Wales and Brittany. The church is a Grade I listed building and its surviving fabric dates from the 13th century onwards. Of the earliest date is the font and the south wall. The granite west tower is 15th-century perpendicular gothic, and the waggon roof also dates from that century.

The church was described in The Cornishman newspaper as "an old and dilapidated structure" following a storm, when the porch and the south aisle lost much of their roofing on 29 April 1882. Subsequently the church was restored, with unusual sensitivity for the period, by E H Sedding in 1894.

Other than the font, the church also contains a 14th-century sepulchre to the Carminow family and the mausoleum of Sir Richard Vyvyan, 1st Baronet (d.1665).

== Trelowarren ==
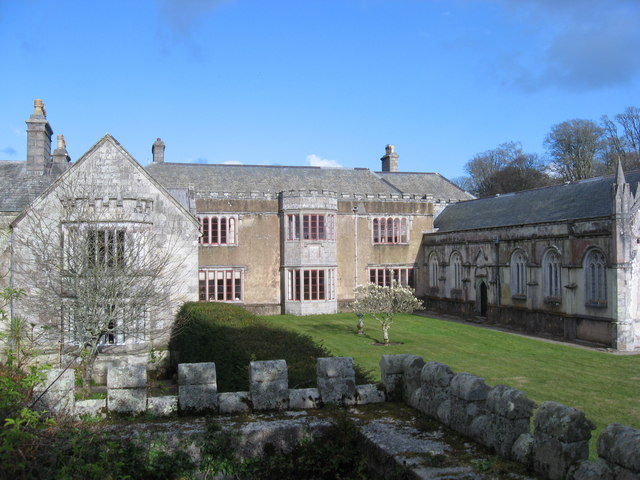
Trelowarren House

At Trelowarren is the estate of the Vyvyan family, who have owned it since 1427. The Halliggye Fogou at Trelowarren is the largest in Cornwall. Trelowarren House has a complex history: the original house is mid-15th century and there are later parts dated 1662, 1698 and c. 1750; further additions were made during the 19th century. In the 20th century it was the home of C. C. Vyvyan, the author of a number of books about Cornwall.

== Notes ==
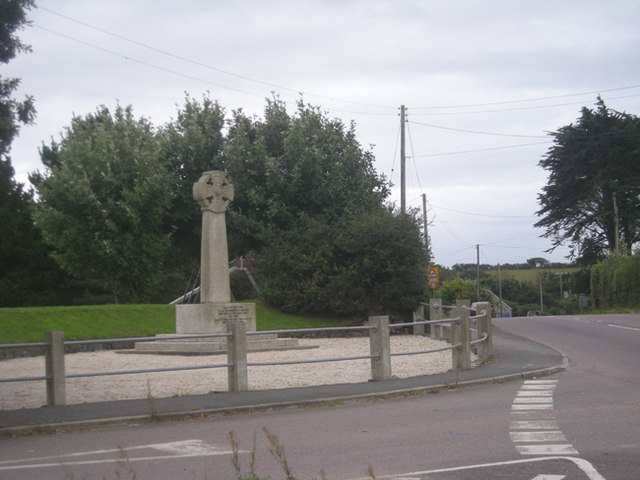
The war memorial
