= Joseph Tredenham =

English administrator and Member of Parliament

Sir Joseph Tredenham (c. 1641 – 24/25 April 1707) of Tregonan, St Ewe, Cornwall was an English administrator and Tory Member of Parliament.

He was the second surviving son of attorney John Tredenham of Philleigh, Cornwall and the younger brother of William Tredenham, MP.

He was appointed High Sheriff of Cornwall for 1664–65. He then entered Parliament, representing St Mawes from 1666 to 1679, Grampound from March to July, 1679, St Mawes again from October 1679 to March 1681, Grampound again from 1685 to 1687 and finally St Mawes again from 1689 to 1695 and 1698 to his death in 1707. He was knighted by 1666.

He served as Governor of St Mawes (a garrison fort near Falmouth, Cornwall), as Vice-Admiral of North Cornwall from 1679 to possibly 1686 and as Vice-warden of the Stannaries by 1682 to 1689. He was also a Gentleman of the Privy Chamber from 1664 to 1685 and the joint-comptroller of Army accounts from 1603 to his death.

He died in 1707. He had married in 1666 Elizabeth, daughter of Sir Edward Seymour, 3rd Baronet, of Berry Pomeroy, Devon. He had one surviving son and two daughters. He was buried in Westminster Abbey.
