= Mating of yeast =

Biological process of yeast

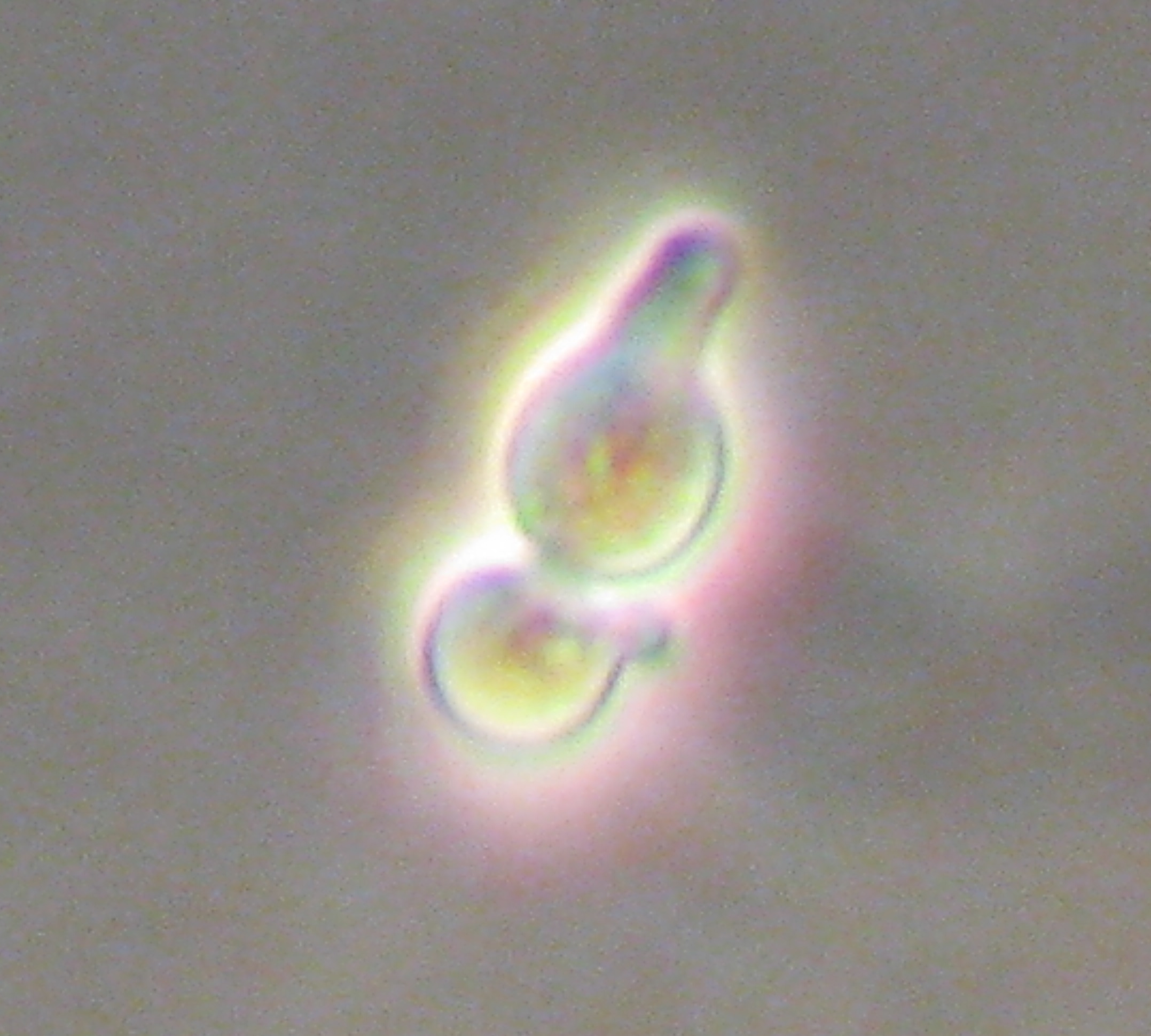
Saccharomyces cerevisiae mating with an a cell projecting a shmoo in response to α-factor

The mating of yeast, also known as yeast sexual reproduction, is a biological process that promotes genetic diversity and adaptation in yeast species. Yeast species, such as Saccharomyces cerevisiae (baker's yeast), are single-celled eukaryotes that can exist as either haploid cells, which contain a single set of chromosomes, or diploid cells, which contain two sets of chromosomes. Haploid yeast cells come in two mating types, a and α, each producing specific pheromones to identify and interact with the opposite type, thus displaying simple sexual differentiation. (Note: For the sake of clarity, this article bolds the Latin letter "a" and uses regular font weight for the Greek α. The usual convention is to print both in the same weight, but doing so would make the two letters hard to tell apart in italicized text.) A yeast cell's mating type is determined by a specific genetic locus known as MAT, which governs its mating behaviour. Haploid yeast can switch mating types through a form of genetic recombination, allowing them to change mating type as often as every cell cycle. When two haploid cells of opposite mating types encounter each other, they undergo a complex signaling process that leads to cell fusion and the formation of a diploid cell. Diploid cells can reproduce asexually, but under nutrient-limiting conditions, they undergo meiosis to produce new haploid spores.

The differences between a and α cells, driven by specific gene expression patterns regulated by the MAT locus, are crucial for the mating process. Additionally, the decision to mate involves a highly sensitive and complex signaling pathway that includes pheromone detection and response mechanisms. In nature, yeast mating often occurs between closely related cells, although mating type switching and pheromone signaling allow for occasional outcrossing to enhance genetic variation. Certain yeast species have unique mating behaviors, demonstrating the diversity and adaptability of yeast reproductive strategies.

== Mating types ==
Yeast cells can stably exist in either a diploid or a haploid form. Both haploid and diploid yeast cells reproduce by mitosis, in which daughter cells bud from mother cells. Haploid cells are capable of mating with other haploid cells of the opposite mating type (an a cell can only mate with an α cell and vice versa) to produce a stable diploid cell. Diploid cells, usually upon facing stressful conditions like nutrient depletion, can undergo meiosis to produce four haploid spores: two a spores and two α spores.

=== Differences between a and α cells ===
Two haploid yeast of opposite mating types secrete pheromones, grow projections, and mate

a cells produce a-factor, a mating pheromone which signals the presence of an a cell to neighbouring α cells. a cells respond to α-factor, the α cell mating pheromone, by growing a projection (known as a shmoo, due to its distinctive shape resembling the Al Capp cartoon character Shmoo) towards the source of α-factor. Similarly, α cells produce α-factor, and respond to a-factor by growing a projection towards the source of the pheromone. The selective response of haploid cells to the mating pheromones of the opposite mating type allows mating between a and α cells, but not between cells of the same mating type.

These phenotypic differences between a and α cells are due to a different set of genes being actively transcribed and repressed in cells of the two mating types. a cells activate genes which produce a-factor and produce a cell surface receptor (Ste2) which binds to α-factor and triggers signaling within the cell. a cells also repress the genes associated with being an α cell. Conversely, α cells activate genes which produce α-factor and produce a cell surface receptor (Ste3) which binds and responds to a-factor, and α cells repress the genes associated with being an a cell.

=== MAT locus ===
The different sets of transcriptional repression and activation, which characterize a and α cells, are caused by the presence of one of two alleles for a mating-type locus called MAT: MATa or MATα located on chromosome III. The MAT locus is usually divided into five regions (W, X, Y, Z1, and Z2) based on the sequences shared among the two mating types. The difference lie in the Y region (Ya and Yα), which contains most of the genes and promoters.

The MATa allele of MAT encodes a gene called a1, which directs the a-specific transcriptional program (such as expressing STE2 and repressing STE3) that defines an a haploid cell. The MATα allele of MAT encodes the α1 and α2 genes, which directs the α-specific transcriptional program (such as expressing STE3, repressing STE2, and producing prepro-α-factor) that defines an α haploid cell. S. cerevisiae has an a2 gene with no apparent function that shares much of its sequence with α2; however, other yeast species like Candida albicans do have a functional and distinct MATa2 gene.

=== Differences between haploid and diploid cells ===
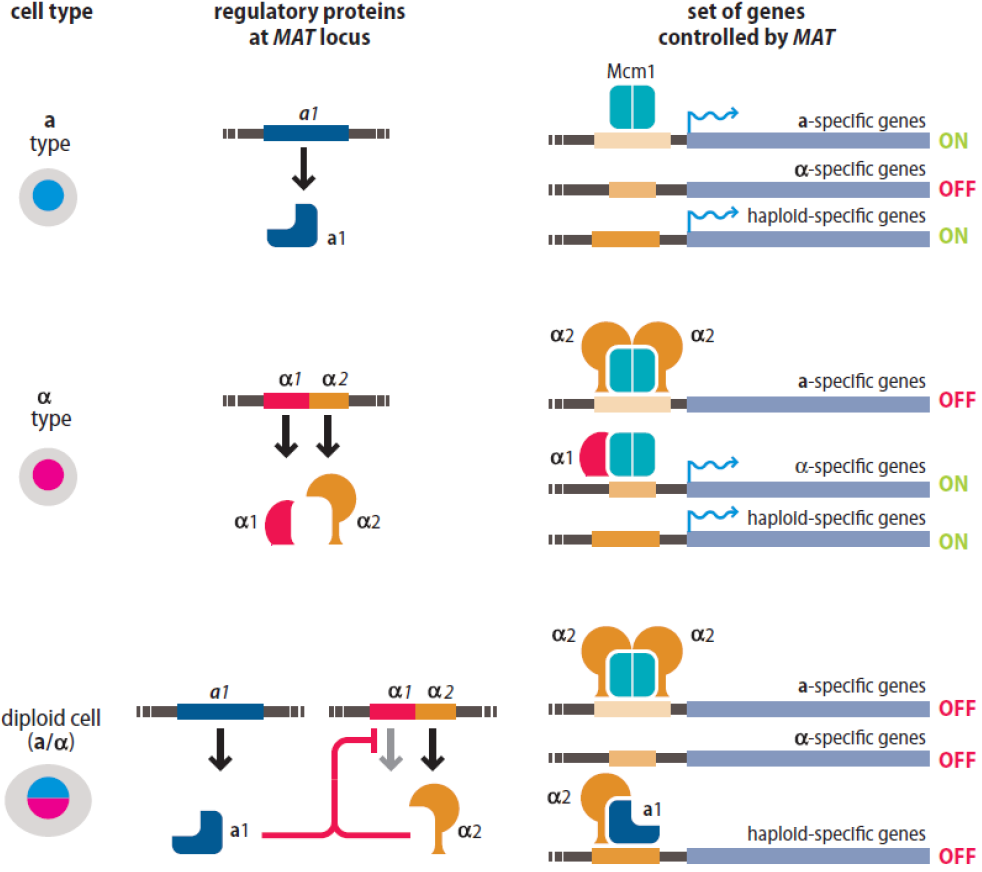
Regulation of mating in haploid and diploid yeast cells using the MAT locus

Haploid cells are one of two mating types (a or α) and respond to the mating pheromone produced by haploid cells of the opposite mating type. Haploid cells cannot undergo meiosis. Diploid cells do not produce or respond to either mating pheromone and do not mate, but they can undergo meiosis to produce four haploid cells.

Like the differences between haploid a and α cells, different patterns of gene repression and activation are responsible for the phenotypic differences between haploid and diploid cells. In addition to the transcriptional patterns of a and α cells, haploid cells of both mating types share a haploid transcriptional pattern which activates haploid-specific genes (such as HO) and represses diploid-specific genes (such as IME1). Conversely, diploid cells activate diploid-specific genes and repress haploid-specific genes.

The different gene expression patterns of haploid and diploid cells are attributable to the MAT locus. Haploid cells only contain one copy of each of the 16 chromosomes and therefore only possess one MAT allele (either MATa or MATα), which determines their mating type. Diploid cells result from the mating of an a cell and an α cell, and they possess 32 chromosomes (in 16 pairs), including one chromosome bearing the MATa allele and another chromosome bearing the MATα allele. The combination of the information encoded by the MATa allele (the a1 gene) and the MATα allele (the α1 and α2 genes) triggers the diploid transcriptional program. Conversely, the presence of only one MAT allele, either MATa or MATα, triggers the haploid transcriptional program.

Through genetic engineering, a MATa allele can be added to a MATα haploid cell, causing it to behave like a diploid cell. The cell will not produce or respond to mating pheromones, and when starved, the cell will unsuccessfully attempt to undergo meiosis with fatal results. Similarly, deletion of one copy of the MAT locus in a diploid cell, leaving either a MATa or MATα allele, will cause a diploid cell to behave like a haploid cell of the associated mating type.

=== a-like faker cells ===
α cells with inactivated α1 and α2 genes at the MAT locus will exhibit the mating behavior of a cells. When an a-like faker (alf) cell mates with an α cell, they form a diploid cell lacking an active copy of the a1 gene. As a result, these diploid cells cannot form the a1-α2 protein complex needed to repress haploid-specific genes. This diploid cell will act like a haploid α cell, producing α pheromones to mate with an a haploid cell, resulting in aneuploidy.

Since α cells do not ordinarily mate with each other, the presence of a-like faker cells in a population of α cells can be detected in an a-like faker assay. This test exposes the MATα population, which lacks an active copy of the HIS3 gene, to a tester strain like YPH316 yeast, which lack a HIS1 gene, on YEPD agar. After transferring the pairs of yeast strains onto Sabouraud agar, only those that formed diploid cells by having a-like faker cells mate with the tester strain will be capable of synthesizing the amino acid histidine to survive. The extent of chromosome instability can be inferred from the proportion of surviving pairs since a-like faker cells naturally arise from damage to Chromosome III in yeast cells.

== Decision to mate ==
Mating in yeast is stimulated by a cells' a-factor or α cells' α-factor pheromones binding the Ste3 receptor of α cells or Ste2 receptor of a cells, respectively, activating a heterotrimeric G protein. The dimeric portion of this G-protein recruits Ste5 and its MAPK cascade to the membrane, resulting in the phosphorylation of Fus3.

The switching mechanism arises as a result of competition between the Fus3 protein (a MAPK protein) and the phosphatase Ptc1. These proteins both attempt to control the four phosphorylation sites of Ste5, a scaffold protein, with Fus3 attempting to phosphorylate the phosphosites and Ptc1 attempting to dephosphorylate them.

Presence of α-factor induces recruitment of Ptc1 to Ste5 via a four-amino acid motif located within the Ste5 phosphosites. Ptc1 then dephosphorylates Ste5, resulting in the dissociation of the Fus3-Ste5 complex. Fus3 dissociates in a switch-like manner, dependent on the phosphorylation state of the four phosphosites. All four phosphosites must be dephosphorylated in order for Fus3 to dissociate. Fus3's ability to compete with Ptc1 decreases as Ptc1 is recruited, and thus the rate of dephosphorylation increases with the presence of pheromone.

Kss1, a homologue of Fus3, does not affect shmooing, and does not contribute to the switch-like mating decision.

In yeast, mating as well as the production of shmoos occur via an all-or-none, switch-like mechanism. This switch-like mechanism allows yeast cells to avoid making an unwise commitment to a highly demanding procedure. The decision to mate must balance being energy-conservative and fast enough to avoid losing the potential mate.

Yeast maintain an ultra-sensitivity to mating through:

1. Multi-site phosphorylation – Fus3 only dissociates from Ste5 and becomes fully active when all four of the phosphosites are dephosphorylated. Even one phosphorylated site will result in immunity to α-factor.
2. Two-stage binding – Fus3 and Ptc1 bind to separate docking sites on Ste5. Only after docking can they act on the phosphosites.
3. Steric hindrance – competition between Fus3 and Ptc1 to control the four phosphosites on Ste3

a and α yeast share the same mating response pathway, with the only difference being the type of receptor that each mating type possesses. Thus, the above description of an a-type yeast stimulated with α-factor resembles the mechanism of an α-type yeast stimulated with a-factor.

== Mating type switching ==
A haploid yeast dividing and undergoing a mating type switch, allowing mating and diploid formation.

Wild type haploid yeast are capable of switching mating type between a and α. Consequently, even if a single haploid cell of a given mating type founds a colony of yeast, mating type switching will cause cells of both a and α mating types to be present in the population. Combined with the strong drive for haploid cells to mate with cells of the opposite mating type and form diploids, mating type switching and consequent mating will cause the majority of cells in a colony to be diploid, regardless of whether a haploid or diploid cell founded the colony. The vast majority of yeast strains studied in laboratories have been altered such that they cannot perform mating type switching (by deletion of the HO gene; see below). This allows the stable propagation of haploid yeast, as haploid cells of the a mating type will remain a cells (and α cells will remain α cells), unable to form diploid cells unless artificially exposed to the other mating type.

Location of the silent HML and HMR loci and the active MAT locus on yeast chromosome III

=== HML and HMR: the silent mating cassettes ===
Haploid yeast switch mating type by replacing the information present at the MAT locus. For example, an a cell will switch to an α cell by replacing the MATa allele with the MATα allele. This replacement of one allele of MAT for the other is possible because yeast cells carry an additional silenced copy of both the MATa and MATα alleles: the HML (homothallic mating left) locus typically carries a silenced copy of the MATα allele, and the HMR (homothallic mating right) locus typically carries a silenced copy of the MATa allele. The silent HML and HMR loci are often referred to as the silent mating cassettes, as the information present there is 'read into' the active MAT locus.

These additional copies of the mating type information do not interfere with the function of whatever allele is present at the MAT locus because they are not expressed, so a haploid cell with the MATa allele present at the active MAT locus is still an a cell, despite also having a silenced copy of the MATα allele present at HML. Only the allele present at the active MAT locus is transcribed, and thus only the allele present at MAT will influence cell behaviour. Hidden mating type loci are epigenetically silenced by SIR proteins, which form a heterochromatin scaffold that prevents transcription from the silent mating cassettes.

=== Mechanics of the mating type switch ===
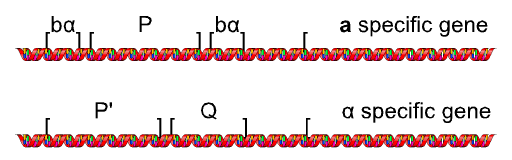
Yeast mating type promoter structure

The process of mating type switching is a gene conversion event initiated by the HO gene. The HO gene is a tightly regulated haploid-specific gene that is only activated in haploid cells during the G_{1} phase of the cell cycle. The protein encoded by the HO gene is a DNA endonuclease, which physically cleaves DNA, but only at the MAT locus (due to the DNA sequence specificity of the HO endonuclease).

Once HO cuts the DNA at MAT, exonucleases are attracted to the cut DNA ends and begin to degrade the DNA on both sides of the cut site. This DNA degradation by exonucleases eliminates the DNA which encoded the MAT allele; however, the resulting gap in the DNA is repaired by copying in the genetic information present at either HML or HMR, filling in a new allele of either the MATa or MATα gene. Thus, the silenced alleles of MATa and MATα present at HML and HMR serve as a source of genetic information to repair the HO-induced DNA damage at the active MAT locus.

=== Directionality of the mating type switch ===
The repair of the MAT locus after cutting by the HO endonuclease almost always results in a mating type switch. When an a cell cuts the MATa allele present at the MAT locus, the cut at MAT will almost always be repaired by copying the information present at HML. This results in MAT being repaired to the MATα allele, switching the mating type of the cell from a to α. Similarly, an α cell which has its MATα allele cut by the HO endonuclease will almost always repair the damage using the information present at HMR, copying the MATa gene to the MAT locus and switching the mating type of α cell to a.

This is the result of a recombination enhancer (RE) located on the left arm of chromosome III. Normally, a cells have Mcm1 bind to the RE to promote recombination using the HML region. Deletion of the RE causes a cells to instead repair using HMR, maintaining their status as a cells rather than switching mating types. In α cells, the α2 factor binds at the RE to repress recombination using the HML region. Thus, yeast have a predetermined tendency toward DNA repair of the MAT locus using the HMR region.

== Mating and inbreeding ==
In 2006, evolutionary geneticist Leonid Kruglyak found that S. cerevisiae matings only involve out-crossing between different strains roughly once every 50,000 cell divisions. The vast majority of yeast mating instead involves members of the same strain because mating type switching allows a single ascus to produce both mating types from a single haploid cell. This suggests that yeast primarily maintain their capability to mate through recombinational DNA repair during meiosis, rather than natural selection for fitness among a population with high genetic variability.

== Other yeasts ==
The three-loci mating-type switch system is an innovation of the Saccharomycetaceae (baker's yeast family). Other yeasts generally only have one mating-type per individual (are heterothallic and cannot switch). The following are example that, like the baker's yeast family, have evolved a way to self-mate or switch types:

=== Methyltrophs ===
The methyltrophs Ogataea polymorpha, Ogataea parapolymorpha (possibly all of Ogataea), Komagataella, and Pachysolen tannophilus have a similar two-locus system where MAT loci are exchanged via an inversion mediated by inverted repeats. One copy is kept silent by the telemere or the centromere. Because they too belong to the Saccharomycotina like the baker's yeast, it's likely that the three-locus system evolved from a similar two-locus system.

Furthermore, the non-methyltroph (but also Saccaromycotina, and possibly close to Saccharomycetaceae) Ascoidea rubescens has the same kind of system.

=== Fission yeast ===
Schizosaccharomyces pombe is a facultative sexual yeast that can undergo mating when nutrients are limited. Exposure of S. pombe to hydrogen peroxide, which causes oxidative stress to DNA, strongly induces mating, meiosis, and formation of meiotic spores. Thus, meiosis and meiotic recombination may be an adaptation for repairing DNA damage. The MAT locus' structure in S. pombe resembles S. cerevisiae. The mating-type switching system is similar but evolved independently.

=== Self-mating in Cryptococcus neoformans ===
Cryptococcus neoformans is a basidiomycetous fungus that grows as a budding yeast in culture and infected hosts. C. neoformans causes life-threatening meningoencephalitis in immunocompromised patients. It undergoes a filamentous transition during the sexual cycle to produce spores, the suspected infectious agent. The vast majority of environmental and clinical isolates of C. neoformans are of mating type α. Filaments ordinarily have haploid nuclei, but these can undergo a process of diploidization (perhaps by endoreduplication or stimulated nuclear fusion) to form diploid cells termed blastospores.

The diploid nuclei of blastospores can then undergo meiosis, including recombination, to form haploid basidiospores that can then be dispersed. This process is referred to as monokaryotic fruiting. This process depends on the gene dmc1, a conserved homologue of the bacterial RecA and eukaryotic RAD51 genes. Dmc1 mediates homologous chromosome pairing during meiosis and repair of double-strand breaks in DNA. Meiosis in C. neoformans may be performed to promote DNA repair in DNA-damaging environments, such as host-mediated responses to infection.
