= George Morley (MP) =

English politician

George Morley (1664–1711) was an English (later British) Tory politician, MP for Hindon on three occasions.

Morley was the son of Francis Morley MP. He matriculated at Christ Church, Oxford, in 1682, aged 17. He became a student of Lincoln's Inn in 1683, and of the Inner Temple in 1688. He was perhaps created DCL in 1706.

During the Visit to England of Russian Tsar Peter the Great in 1698, Morley staged a masquerade and hosted a supper for him, in his chambers at the Inner Temple.

Standing for Parliament at Hindon in 1698, Morley was defeated, with Sir James Howe (Tory) and Reynolds Calthorpe (Whig) elected, and petitioned unsuccessfully against the result. In January 1701, Howe and Calthorpe were re-elected, but Morley petitioned successfully, unseating Calthorpe for bribery. In November 1701 Howe did not stand, and Morley and Calthorpe were elected unopposed. In 1702 Morley and Howe were elected, but after accusations of bribery both ways, Morley was found guilty of bribery and his election declared void on 27 November 1702. At the by-election for Morley's seat, in November 1704, Morley was defeated by Thomas Jervoise (Whig).

Morley and Calthorpe were elected in 1705; Morley did not stand in 1708. In 1710 there was a double return, with Morley and Calthorpe both declared elected alongside Edmund Lambert (Tory), but Calthorpe stood aside. Morley remained MP until his death in May 1711.

Parliament of England
Preceded by Sir James Howe; Reynolds Calthorpe	Member of Parliament for Hindon; 1701–1702; With: Sir James Howe 1701; Reynolds Calthorpe 1701–1702	Succeeded by Sir James Howe; Thomas Jervoise (1704)
Preceded by Sir James Howe; Thomas Jervoise	Member of Parliament for Hindon; 1705–1707; With: Reynolds Calthorpe	Succeeded by themselves
Parliament of Great Britain
Preceded by themselves	Member of Parliament for Hindon; 1707–1708; With: Reynolds Calthorpe	Succeeded by Sir James Howe; Edmund Lambert
Preceded by Edmund Lambert; Reynolds Calthorpe	Member of Parliament for Hindon; 1710–1711; With: Edmund Lambert	Succeeded by Edmund Lambert; Henry Lee Warner
