= William Aubrey =

Member of the Parliament of England

Dr William Aubrey MP
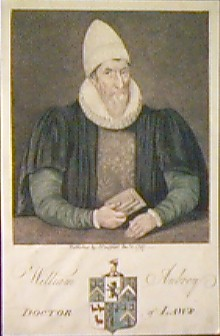
- William Aubrey

Member of Parliament for Carmarthen Boroughs
- In office 1554

Member of Parliament for Brecon
- In office 1558

Member of Parliament for Hindon
- In office 1559

Member of Parliament for Arundel
- In office 1563–1567

Member of Parliament for Taunton
- In office 1593

Personal details
- Born: c. 1529 Brecknockshire
- Died: 25 June 1595 London
- Resting place: Old St Paul's Cathedral, London
- Parent: Thomas Aubrey, MD (father)
- Education: Christ College, Brecon
- Alma mater: All Souls College, Oxford

Military service
- Battles/wars: St Quentin (1557)

William Aubrey (c. 1529 – 25 June 1595) was Regius Professor of Civil Law at the University of Oxford from 1553 to 1559, and was one of the founding Fellows of Jesus College, Oxford. He was also a Member of Parliament for various Welsh and English constituencies between 1554 and 1592.

== Early life and Oxford University ==
Aubrey was born in Brecknockshire, Wales, the second of Thomas Aubrey, MD, of Cantreff.

After being educated at what later became Christ College, Brecon, Aubrey went to Oxford University, becoming a Fellow of All Souls College, Oxford in 1547. He obtained a BCL degree in 1549 and was appointed Principal of New Inn Hall, Oxford in 1550. In 1553 he succeeded Robert Weston as Regius Professor of Civil Law. He held the position until 1559, when he was succeeded by John Griffith. He served as judge-marshal of the army led by William Herbert, the Earl of Pembroke in the St. Quentin campaign of 1557.

In 1571 he was named in the foundation charter as one of the original eight fellows of Jesus College, Oxford. He obtained the degree of DCL in 1554 and the following year he was made a Master in Chancery.

== Legal and political work ==
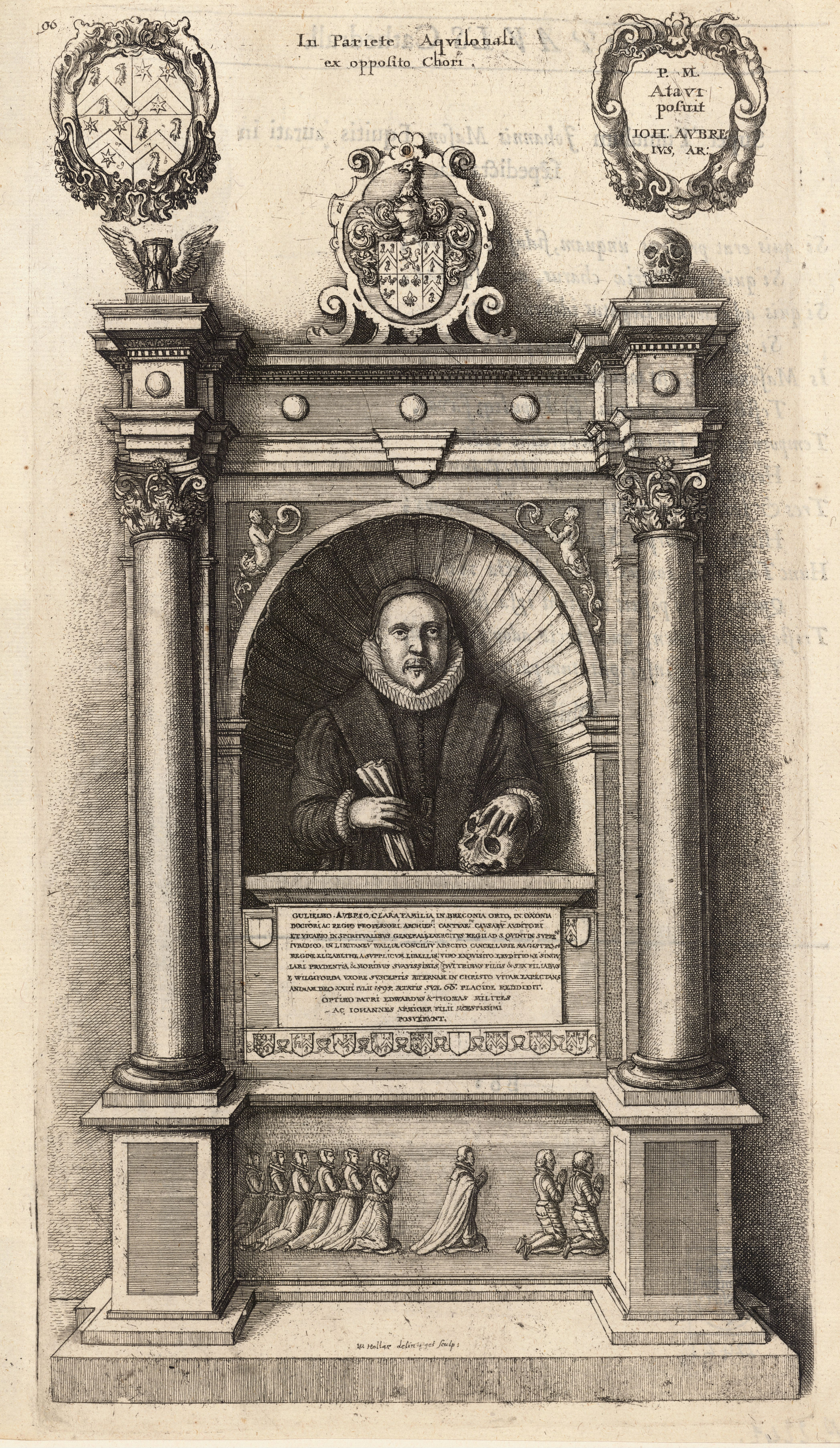
Aubrey was buried in Old St Paul's Cathedral. This engraving of his monument is by Wenceslaus Hollar.

In 1562 Aubrey was a member of the commission set up by Matthew Parker, Archbishop of Canterbury that declared unlawful the marriage of Lady Catherine Grey to Henry Herbert (son of the 1st Earl of Pembroke). He was one of the signatories of the opinion that John Lesley (Bishop of Ross and an ambassador for Mary, Queen of Scots) could be tried in England for intriguing against Queen Elizabeth.

He was MP for various constituencies: Carmarthen Boroughs (1554), Brecon (1558), Hindon (1559), Arundel (1563), and Taunton (1593). He was a member of the Council of Wales and the Marches from 1586. He was also auditor and vicar-general of the Province of Canterbury under Archbishop Grindal, retaining his position as vicar-general under Archbishop Whitgift.

== Death ==
Aubrey died in London, England in 1595 and was buried in Old St Paul's Cathedral.

Parliament of England
Preceded by Gruffydd Williams	Member of Parliament for Carmarthen Boroughs; 1554	Succeeded by John Parry
Unknown	Member of Parliament for Brecon; 1558	Succeeded by Rowland Vaughan
Preceded by John Gibbon; Henry Jones	Member of Parliament for Hindon; 1559; With: Henry Jones	Succeeded by John Foster; George Acworth
Preceded by Sir Francis Knollys; Thomas Heneage	Member of Parliament for Arundel; 1563–1567; With: Sir John St. Leger	Succeeded by Thomas Browne; Michael Heneage
Preceded by Thomas Fisher; John Goldwell	Member of Parliament for Taunton; 1593; With: John Davidge	Succeeded by Edward Barker; Edward Hext
