= Sir James Howe, 2nd Baronet =

English Tory politician

Sir James Howe, 2nd Baronet (c. 1669 – 19 January 1736), of Berwick St Leonard, near Hindon, Wiltshire, was an English Tory politician who sat in the English and British House of Commons between 1698 and 1709.

Howe was the son of Sir George Howe, 1st Baronet, of Berwick St Leonard, and his wife Elizabeth Grimston, daughter of Sir Harbottle Grimston, 2nd Baronet. His father had been MP for Hindon. He succeeded to the baronetcy on the death of his father in 1676. He married Elizabeth Nutt, daughter of Edward Nutt of Nackington, Kent, in 1689. She died in 1691 and he married as his second wife Elizabeth Stratford, daughter of Henry Stratford of Halling, Gloucester, in August 1694.

At the 1698 general election, Howe was elected as Tory Member of Parliament for Hindon. He was returned at the first general election of 1701, but chose not to stand in at the second general election of that year. He was re-elected MP for Hindon at the 1702 election and held the seat until the 1705 election when he was defeated. At the 1708 election he was returned again as MP for Hindon, but was unseated on petition in February 1709.

Howe died without issue on 19 January 1736 aged 66. His estates were inherited by his nephew Henry Lee Warner, who had sat for Hindon from 1711 to 1713.

Parliament of England
Preceded by Robert Hyde; Colonel Henry Lee	Member of Parliament for Hindon; 1698–1701; With: Reynolds Calthorpe 1698–1701; George Morley 1701	Succeeded by George Morley; Reynolds Calthorpe
Preceded by George Morley; Reynolds Calthorpe	Member of Parliament for Hindon; 1702–1705; With: George Morley 1702–1704; Thomas Jervoise 1704–1705	Succeeded by George Morley; Reynolds Calthorpe
Parliament of Great Britain
Preceded by George Morley; Reynolds Calthorpe	Member of Parliament for Hindon; 1708–1709; With: Edmund Lambert	Succeeded by Reynolds Calthorpe; Edmund Lambert
Baronetage of England
Preceded by George Howe	Baronet of Cold Barwick; 1676–1736	Extinct
