= Edmund Lambert =

British Member of Parliament (1666–1734)

Edmund Lambert (1666–1734), of Boyton, Wiltshire, was an English lawyer and Tory politician who sat in the House of Commons between 1708 and 1722.

== Life ==
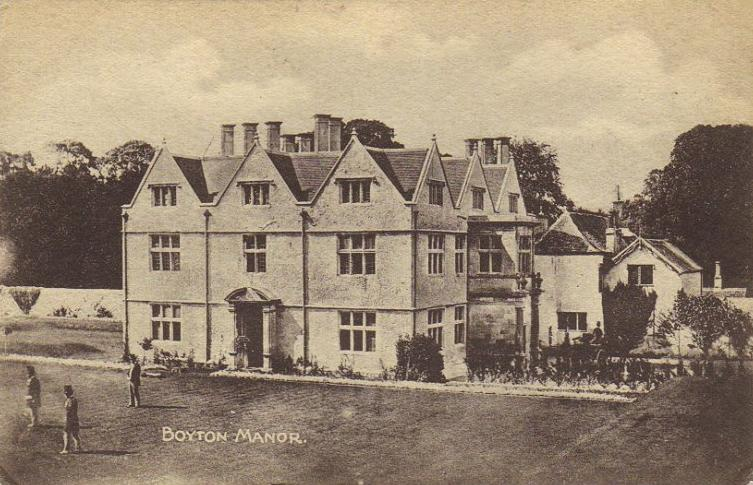
Boyton Manor c.1910

Lambert was baptized on 26 July 1666, the eldest son of Thomas Lambert of Boyton and his wife Eleanor Topp, daughter of Edward Topp of Stockton, Wiltshire. He matriculated at Christ Church, Oxford in 1682 and entered Middle Temple in 1683. He was called to the bar in 1689. Before June 1689, he married Sarah Blake, daughter of Peter Blake of Andover, Hampshire. He succeeded his father in 1692.

Lambert was returned as Tory Member of Parliament for Hindon at the 1708 general election. He voted against the impeachment of Henry Sacheverell. He was returned again at the 1710 election and was listed as a 'Tory patriot' opposed to the continuance of the war. He was a member of the October Club. However, he supported the French commerce bill, which had potentially adverse effect on the woollen industry and that reduced his support among the Hindon voters. He was defeated at the 1713 election.

At the 1715 general election, he was again returned as a Tory for Salisbury. He voted against the Government in all recorded divisions. He did not stand at the 1722 election.

Lambert died on 29 January 1734 and was buried at Boyton. He and his wife had four daughters. He left all his lands in Boyton, Corton and Sherrington, Wiltshire, to his nephew, Edmund Lambert, and £1,000 to his eldest daughter Jane.

Parliament of Great Britain
Preceded by George Morley; Reynolds Calthorpe	Member of Parliament for Hindon; 1708–1713; With: Sir James Howe 1708-1709; Reynolds Calthorpe 1709-1710; George Morley 1710-1711; Henry Lee Warner 1711-1713	Succeeded by Reynolds Calthorpe, the younger Richard Lockwood
Preceded by Sir Stephen Fox; Richard Jones	Member of Parliament for Salisbury; 1715–1722; With: Francis Swanton 1715-1721; Anthony Duncombe 1721-1722	Succeeded by Anthony Duncombe; Francis Kenton
