= Francis Morley =

English Member of Parliament (c1623-1690)

Francis Morley (c. 1623 – 10 December 1690) was an English politician, MP for Winchester 1689–1690.

Morley was the son of Francis Morley, a captain in the English Civil War, and the nephew of George Morley, Bishop of Winchester.

He stood for Parliament at Winchester in 1685, but was persuaded to withdraw by his uncle's friend Bishop Thomas Ken. He was elected at Winchester in 1689, defeated in 1690, and died on 10 December 1690.

He was the father of George Morley, MP for Hindon.
