= Reynolds Calthorpe (1689–1714) =

Reynolds Calthorpe (6 November 1689 – 10 April 1714) briefly served as a Member of Parliament in the House of Commons of Great Britain from 1713 to 1714.

== Biography ==
Calthorpe was the eldest son of Reynolds Calthorpe of Elvetham, and the only son by his first wife Priscilla, daughter of Sir Robert Reynolds. He was educated at Bury St Edmunds Grammar School,

Calthorpe was elected to Parliament for the corrupt borough of Hindon on 29 August 1713, during the general election of that year. Calthorpe and the other Whig candidate, Richard Lockwood, defeated the Tories Richard Jones and Edmund Lambert. In Parliament Calthorpe voted against the expulsion of Richard Steele on 18 March 1714. Jones had also contested Salisbury, for which he took his seat, but Lambert petitioned against the election result, alleging bribery. However, Calthorpe's unexpected death from smallpox on 10 April 1714 caused the petition to lapse, and the seat remained vacant until the general election the next year, when his father was re-elected.

Calthorpe was buried at Elvetham.

Parliament of Great Britain
Preceded by Edmund Lambert; Henry Lee Warner	Member of Parliament for Hindon; 1713–1714; With: Richard Lockwood	Succeeded by George Wade; Reynolds Calthorpe
