= Ptc1 =

Ptc1 is a type Two C phosphatase involved in the mating decision of yeast. Ptc1 competes with Fus3 for control of the 4 phosphorylation sites on the scaffold protein Ste5. Presence of the mating pheromone α-factor causes Ptc1 to be recruited to Ste5. This recruitment takes place via a 4 amino acid motif in the Ste5 phosphosites.

Ptc1 is also involved in regulating the osmotic stress of yeast, especially via inactivation of Hog1, a member of the MAPK pathway. This inactivation occurred as a result of dephosphorylation of the phosphotheronine but not the phosphotyrosine residue in the phosphorylation lip of Hog1.

It can be localized to the cytoplasm and nucleus.

== Biological Processes ==
Ptc1 is involved in the following biological processes:

- Inactivation of MAPK activity in osmosensory signalling pathways
- Mitochondrial inheritance
- Pheromone-dependent signal transduction in conjugation with cellular fusion
- Protein dephosphorylation
- tRNA splicing via. Endonucleolytic cleavage and ligation
