= Pelling (surname) =

Pelling is a surname originating in Sussex, England. Notable people with the surname include:

- Albert Pelling (1903–1977), British fencer
- Andrew Pelling (born 1959), British politician
- Christopher Pelling, British literary scholar
- Edward Pelling (baptised 1640–1718), English cleric and academic
- Henry Pelling (1920–1997), British historian
- John Pelling (disambiguation), multiple people
- Kelsie Pelling, better known by the handle KayPea, Canadian content creator and streamer
- Madeleine Pelling (born c. 1990s), English cultural and art historian
- Mark Pelling (born 1956), British circuit judge
- Maurice Pelling (1920–1973), British art director
- Nick Pelling (born 1964), British computer programmer and inventor
- Rowan Pelling (born 1968), British journalist
