= Berwick St Leonard =

Village in Wiltshire, England

Coordinates: 51.098°N 2.110°W

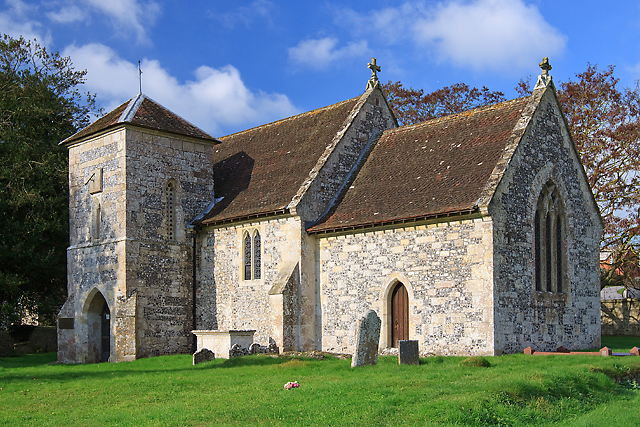
- St Leonard's church

- Location within Wiltshire
- Population: 47 (in 2011)
- OS grid reference: ST924332
- Civil parish: Berwick St Leonard
- Unitary authority: Wiltshire
- Ceremonial county: Wiltshire
- Region: South West
- Country: England
- Sovereign state: United Kingdom
- Post town: Salisbury
- Postcode district: SP3
- Dialling code: 01747
- Police: Wiltshire
- Fire: Dorset and Wiltshire
- Ambulance: South Western
- UK Parliament: Salisbury

Berwick St Leonard is a small village and civil parish in Wiltshire, England, about 8 miles (13 km) southeast of Warminster and 14 miles (23 km) west of Salisbury.

== Geography ==
A small stream rises near that village and flows intermittently, under wet conditions. Soon after leaving the parish the stream forms Fonthill Lake and then joins the Nadder near Tisbury. The northern boundary of the parish is the watershed between the Nadder and the Wylye. The soil is chalky and mainly used for arable cropping and sheep, but increasing numbers of cows have been kept since about 1980.

The A303 trunk road, linking London with southwest England, crosses the parish. Berwick St John village is on the B3089 about 0.8 miles (1.3 km) to the south. The Monarch's Way is a 615-mile (990 km) long-distance footpath that passes through the parish.

== History ==
There is a prehistoric earthwork near Penning, in the north of the parish. From before 1650 to around 1900, nearly all the land in the parish belonged to a single farm, probably Cold Berwick Farm, which appears on a 1773 map but had been demolished by 1822. During those centuries, Cold Berwick was an alternative name for the village.

The name Berwick derives from the Old English berewīc meaning 'barley farm'.

The manor was not mentioned in Domesday Book but may have been included in Shaftesbury Abbey's Tisbury estate. Owners after the Dissolution included Sir George Howe (c.1627–1676, created baronet of Cold Berwick in 1660), his son James (c.1669–1736), and the latter's nephew Henry Lee Warner (1688–1760), who each sat for a time as MP for Hindon. In 1826 the manor was bought by Robert Grosvenor, 2nd Earl Grosvenor who sold it in 1838 to the millionaire businessman James Morrison. The land remains in the Morrison family, now the Barons Margadale, alongside their Fonthill estate.

A manor house was built in the early 17th century immediately south-west of the church. It was used from time to time by Henry Lee Warner and his son, but later fell into disuse and by 1820 served as a barn. It was taken down between 1902 and 1904, and its elaborate three-gabled south front re-erected to build Little Ridge, designed by Detmar Blow for Hugh Morrison on the Fonthill estate. That house was much enlarged and renamed Fonthill House, then itself demolished in 1972.

Berwick House, on the Salisbury road south of the village, began as a farmhouse in the late 18th century (English Heritage) or sometime after 1817 (Orbach). Enlarged during the 19th century, the three-storey brick house has a five-bay front to its three parallel ranges and full-height bow on its left side. It was converted into eight flats in 1949.

In 1934, 230 acres in the south-west of Berwick parish was transferred to Hindon. A small area in the south, including Berwick House, was transferred from Fonthill Gifford in 1986.

== Parish church ==
St Leonard's Church was built in the 12th century and rebuilt in 1860, although care was taken to preserve its external appearance. It has been designated as a Grade II* listed building. The church was closed in 1966, declared redundant in 1973 and is now in the care of the Churches Conservation Trust. Today Berwick St. Leonard falls within the area of the Nadder Valley team ministry, a grouping of sixteen rural churches.

== Local government ==
The parish is in the area of Wiltshire Council unitary authority, which is responsible for all significant local government functions. The civil parish does not elect a parish council. Instead the first tier of local government is a parish meeting, which all electors are entitled to attend.
