= John Bekinsau =

English politician and theologian

John Bekinsau (1496?–1559) was an English classical scholar and theologian.

== Life ==
He was born at Broadchalke, in Wiltshire, about 1496; his father was John Bekinsau, of Hartley Wespell, Hampshire. Bekinsau was educated at Winchester School, and proceeded to New College, Oxford; he was made Fellow of his college in 1520, and took the degree of M.A. in 1526. At Oxford he was, according to Anthony Wood, esteemed ‘an admirable Grecian;’ and on proceeding to Paris he read the Greek lecture in the university, probably soon after 1530, the year in which Francis I of France founded the royal professorships and revived the study of Greek at Paris. Having returned to England, Bekinsau married, and so vacated his fellowship, in 1538.

He was a friend of John Leland, who addresses a poem to a forthcoming work of Bekinsau, and refers to the learning and Parisian studies of its author. John Bale gives a hostile account of Bekinsau, alleging that his work on the supremacy was only written for money, and adding that he returned to the Roman church in 1554, ‘like a dog to his vomit.’ In Mary's reign he was a Member of Parliament for Downton and Hindon. On the accession of Elizabeth, Bekinsau retired to Sherburne, a village in Hampshire, where he died, and was buried on 20 December 1559.

== Works ==
His only extant work is a treatise De supremo et absoluto Regis imperio (London, 1546), republished in Melchior Goldast's Monarchia in 1611; this work is dedicated to Henry VIII, ‘the head of the church immediately after Christ,’ and affirms the full supremacy of the king against that of the Pope. The argument proceeds mainly by quotations from the Church Fathers, particularly John Chrysostom.
