= Thomas Dabridgecourt =

16th-century English politician

Thomas Dabridgecourt (c. 1546 – 3 November 1614), of Horwoods, Preston Candover, Hampshire, was an English politician.

He was a Member (MP) of the Parliament of England for Hindon in 1571 and for Dorchester in 1593.
