= Ste5 =

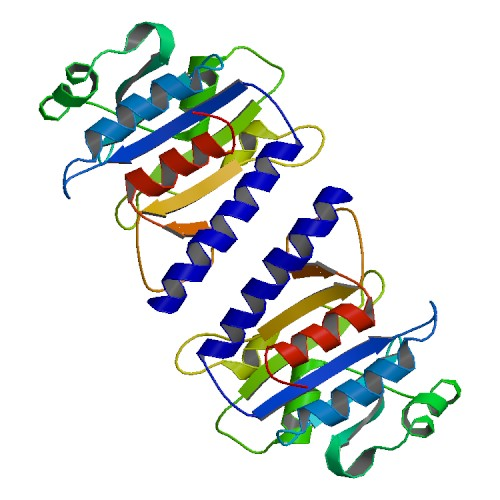
Crystal Structure of Ste5 Protein

Ste5 is a MAPK scaffold protein involved in the mating of yeast. The active complex is formed by interactions with the MAPK Fus3, the MAPK kinase (MAPKK) Ste7, and the MAPKK kinase Ste11. After the induction of mating by an appropriate mating pheromone (either a-factor or α –factor) Ste5 and its associated proteins are recruited to the membrane.

Ste4 helps to recruit Ste5 but is not required for the attachment of Ste5 to the membrane, which depends on a pleckstrin homology domain as well as an amphipathic alpha-helical domain in the amino terminus.

During mating, Fus3 MAPK and Ptc1 phosphatase compete to control 4 phosphorylation sites on the Ste5 scaffold. When all of 4 sites have been dephosphorylated by Ptc1, Fus3 is released and becomes active.

Ste5 plays 2 main roles in the mating signal pathway:

1. Binds the components of the MAPK cascade and holds them in an active complex
2. Associates with the membrane, bringing the kinases to the membrane and promoting amplification of the signal (concentrating the bound kinases). Ste5 remains stably bound at the plasma membrane.

Ste5 oligomerization is very important for stable membrane recruitment. In one model, the activation of the pathway occurs at the same time that Ste5 is converted from a less active, closed form of Ste5 to an active Ste5 dimer that can bind to the beta-gamma subunit of the heterotrimeric G-protein and form a lattice for the MAPK cascade to assemble on.

Not only does Ste5 contribute to propagation of the pheromone signal, but it is also involved in down regulating of signalling. It stimulates autophosphorylation of Fus3, which results in phosphorylation of Ste5, causing a downregulation in signalling.

Ste5 also catalytically unlocks Fus3 (but not its homologue Kss1) for phosphorylation by Ste7. Both this catalytically active Ste5 domain as well as Ste7 are required for full Fus3 activation, which explains why Fus3 is activated by only the mating pathway, and remains inactive during other pathways which also utilize Ste7.

Ste5 can be localized to the cytoplasm, mating projection tip, nucleus, and plasma membrane.

== Biological Processes ==
Ste5 is involved in the following biological processes:

- Invasive growth in response to glucose limitation
- Negative regulation of the MAPK cascade
- Pheromone-dependent signal transduction involved in conjugation with cellular fusion
- Positive regulation of protein phosphorylation
- Regulation of RNA-mediated transposition
