= St Leonard's Church, Berwick St Leonard =

St Leonard's Church
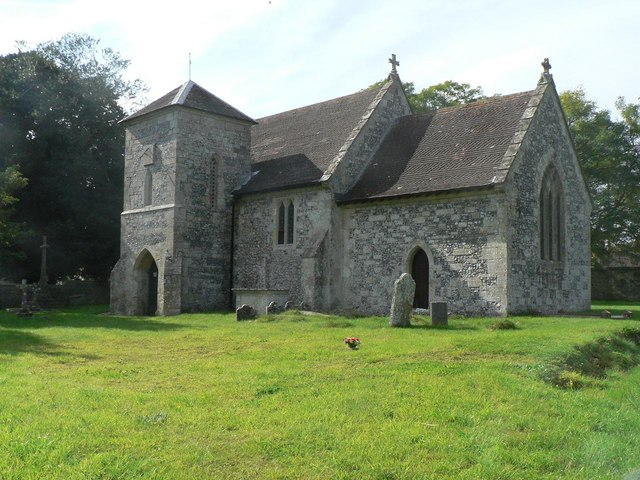

- Location within Wiltshire
- 51°05′51″N 2°06′37″W
- Location: Berwick St Leonard, Wiltshire, England

Listed Building – Grade II*
- Official name: Church of St. Leonard
- Designated: 6 January 1966
- Reference no.: 1318783

St Leonard's Church in Berwick St Leonard, Wiltshire, England, was built in the 12th century. It is recorded in the National Heritage List for England as a designated Grade II* listed building, and is now a redundant church in the care of the Churches Conservation Trust. It was declared redundant on 22 June 1973, and was vested in the Trust on 9 June 1976.

The manor was held in the 12th century by Shaftesbury Abbey's manor of Tisbury. At that time there was no right of burial at Berwick, and bodies were taken to Tisbury. The right of advowson was later held by a variety of individuals, and there was a dispute over the right between John Benett and John Maclntyre, an East India Company general during the early 19th century.

The small church was built of flint and limestone, in the 12th century. The three bay nave is 33 feet 6 inches (10.21 m) by 16 feet 4 inches (4.98 m), while the chancel is just 18 feet 9 inches (5.72 m) long and 13 feet 3 inches (4.04 m) wide. The entrance is beneath the small two-stage south tower which was added in the 14th century, and is supported by diagonal buttresses. The tower holds two bells dating from 1725 and 1766. The church roof is tiled in a fish-scale pattern. Monuments inside the church include those to George Howe, who died in 1647, and his six children. The cylindrical stone font with a brass cover, the lintel over the blocked north doorway, and a sculptured relief of the Lamb of God over the inside of the south doorway date from the Norman era.

By the 19th century the fabric of the building was decaying, and it was rebuilt in 1860 with little change to its external appearance, at the expense of Alfred Morrison of Fonthill Gifford. The church was closed in 1966.

== Parish ==
St Catherine's Church at Sedgehill, some six miles distant, was a chapelry of Berwick from the 14th century until 1914, when Sedgehill was made a separate parish. In 1916 the rectory was united with the adjacent rectory of Fonthill Bishop although the two parishes remained distinct until 1966. Today the parish of Fonthill Bishop with Berwick St. Leonard falls within the area of the Nadder Valley team ministry, a grouping of sixteen rural churches.

== See also ==
- List of churches preserved by the Churches Conservation Trust in Southwest England
