= Thomas Martin (lawyer) =

Member of the Parliament of England

Thomas Martin (also Thomas Martyn) (1521–1593), of Winterbourne St. Martin, Dorset; Steeple Morden, Cambridgeshire, and London, was an English lawyer, controversialist and politician. He was prominent in the trial of Thomas Cranmer.

Martin was a Member (MP) of the Parliament of England for Saltash in October 1553; Hindon April 1554, November 1554 and 1555; and Ludgershall in 1558.

== Early life and education ==
A younger son of John Martyn, gentleman, he was born at Cerne, Dorset.

He educated first at Winchester School and then at New College, Oxford. He became a Fellow of his college 7 March 1538, and after two years of probation, in 1539 admitted perpetual fellow. He is said to have acted as Lord of Misrule during some Christmas festivities at the college. Subsequently, he travelled with pupils in France, and took the degree of doctor of civil law at Bourges. In 1553 Martin resigned his fellowship at New College. He was admitted a member of the College of Advocates at Doctors' Commons 15 January 1555.

== Politics ==
Around 1555, he was official of the archdeaconry of Berkshire, chancellor to Stephen Gardiner, bishop of Winchester, with whom he was in favour, and a master in chancery.

Martin took a conspicuous part in the proceedings against Bishop Hooper, Rowland Taylor, John Taylor, alias Cardmaker, and John Careless. In the prosecution against Archbishop Cranmer he was effective in bringing out the oaths Cranmer swore in 1533. It appears that he interfered to procure the discharge of Robert Horneby, the groom of the chamber to Princess Elizabeth, who had been committed to the Marshalsea for refusing to hear mass. In May and June 1555 he was at Calais, apparently in attendance on Bishop Gardiner, then lord chancellor. In July 1556 he was one of the masters of requests, and he was employed with Sir Roger Cholmeley to examine Silvester Taverner on a charge of embezzling the queen's plate. They were empowered to put him to such tortures as by their discretion should be thought convenient.

In June 1557 he was one of the council of the north, and in the following month a commissioner with the Earl of Westmorland, Bishop Cuthbert Tunstall, and Robert Hyndmer, LL.D., for the settlement of certain differences between England and Scotland, which had been occasioned by the inroads of the Grahams and others. On 13 May 1558 he and others were authorised to bring to the torture, if they should so think good, one French, a prisoner in the Tower of London.

He was vilified in particular by John Bale, and after the accession of Queen Elizabeth he kept a low profile. In 1587 he was incorporated doctor of the civil law at Cambridge. Commissions to him and other civilians to hear admiralty cases were issued in 1591 and 1592.

== Relationship with the crown ==
His treatise against the marriage of priests and monks, finished in 1553 with the assistance, it is said, of Nicholas Udall, was esteemed by Queen Mary I, to whom it was dedicated; she granted him a commission to make Frenchmen and Dutchmen free denizens, and this he executed with such success in the spring of 1554 that he made himself a gentleman. He was incorporated D.C.L. at Oxford 29 July 1555, when he was sent there as one of the queen's commissioners.

In September 1556 it was intended that he should succeed Nicholas Wotton as ambassador at the French court; but in the following month he was despatched by the privy council to Philip II of Spain at Ghent, concerning the contemplated marriage of the Duke of Savoy to the Princess Elizabeth, and also with respect to the trade between England and the States of the Low Countries. The king sent him to the States to treat with them on the latter subject.

During Mary's reign he was Member of Parliament, for Saltash and for Hindon, several times.

== Works ==
Martin's works are:

- A Traictise declaryng and plainly prouyng that the pretensed marriage of Priestes, and professed persones, is no mariage, but altogether unlawful, and in all ages, and al countreies of Christendome, bothe forbidden, and also punyshed. Herewith is comprised in the later chapitres a full confutation of Doctour Poynettes boke entitled a defense for the marriage of Priestes, London, May 1554, dedicated to Queen Mary. John Poynet, whose book had appeared in 1549, published, apparently at Strasburg, a rejoinder to Martin entitled An Apologie in 1556. A Defence of priestes mariages, another answer to Martin's treatise, London [1562?], with a preface and additions by Matthew Parker, has been assigned to both Poynet and Sir Richard Morysin.
- Orations to Archbishop Cranmer, and Disputation and Conferences with him on matters of Religion, 1555 and 1556. Printed in John Foxe's Actes and Monuments.
- Certayne especiall notes for Fishe, Conyes, Pigeons, Artochokes, Strawberries, Muske, Millons, Pompons, Roses, Cheryes, and other fruite trees, 1578, manuscript in the Lansdowne collection in the British Library, No. 101, ff. 43–9.
- Historica Descriptio complectens vitam ac res gestas beatissimi viri Gulielmi Wicami quondam Vintoniensis Episcopi et Angliæ Cancellarii et fundatoris duorum collegiorum Oxoniæ et Vintoniæ, London, 1597, and in a very limited edition, privately printed by John Nicholas, Warden of New College, Oxford, 1690. Martin took the substance of his work from the Life of Wycliffe written by Thomas Chandler.
