= Jasper Rine =

American geneticist

Jasper Donald Rine (born 1953) is an American scientist, a member of the National Academy of Sciences, and a Professor of Genetics, Genomics and Development at the University of California, Berkeley.

Rine received his B.S. from the State University of New York at Albany in 1975 and his Ph.D. in molecular genetics from the University of Oregon in 1979. He then joined the Berkeley faculty in 1982. He is also a former director of the Human Genome Center at Lawrence Berkeley National Laboratory and a fellow of the American Academy of Microbiology, an honorific leadership group of the American Society for Microbiology. As a graduate student with Ira Herskowitz Rine codiscovered yeast SIR proteins, conserved chromatin organizing proteins that modulate gene expression across taxa. As a professor, Rine was also one of the organizers of the Dog Genome Project. He was named a Howard Hughes Medical Institute professor in 2006. His work focuses on epigenetics and understanding the impact of human genetic variation.

== Stolen laptop incident ==
In 2005, a video was posted online depicting Rine speaking before a class and explaining that his laptop, which he stated contained extremely sensitive data from various sources, had been stolen. He attempted to scare the thief—whom Rine believed to be one of the students—into confessing by claiming the Federal Bureau of Investigation was looking into the matter, along with making up an elaborate bluff on how the device was being tracked. Many people with tech knowledge saw through this and called him out for it online.

== Honors and awards ==
- 2015 president of the Genetics Society of America
