= John Ponet =

English Protestant churchman and writer

The Right Reverend John Ponet
- Bishop of Winchester
- Church: Church of England
- Diocese: Diocese of Winchester
- Elected: 8 March 1551
- Term ended: 1553 (Counter-Reformation)
- Predecessor: Stephen Gardiner
- Successor: Stephen Gardiner
- Other post: Bishop of Rochester (1550–1551)

Orders
- Ordination: 10 June 1536 (priest)
- Consecration: 29 June 1550

Personal details
- Born: c. 1514
- Died: August 1556 Strasbourg
- Denomination: Anglican
- Spouse: 2 wives
- Children: a child
- Occupation: Theologian
- Education: Queens' College, Cambridge

John Ponet (c. 1514 – August 1556), sometimes spelled John Poynet, was an English Protestant churchman and controversial writer, the bishop of Winchester and Marian exile. He is now best known as a resistance theorist who made a sustained attack on the divine right of kings.

== Early life ==
Ponet was from Kent. He graduated with a Bachelor of Arts in 1533, was elected a fellow of Queens' College, Cambridge in the same year: and became a Master of Arts in 1535.

== Humanist scholar ==
Ponet was a pupil and one of the humanist circle of Thomas Smith, who claimed that the new pronunciation of Ancient Greek had been introduced by himself, Ponet, and John Cheke. Smith and Cheke also were proponents of mathematics, and Ponet was one of their numerous followers. A sundial of his design was installed at Hampton Court.

Ponet was ordained a priest at Lincoln on 10 June 1536. From 1539 to 1541 he was a university professor of Greek. In the later 1530s and early 1540s he took on college offices at Queens', acting as bursar and Dean.

By the time of the Prebendaries' Plot, Ponet was a partisan of Thomas Cranmer. By 1545, he was Cranmer's chaplain.

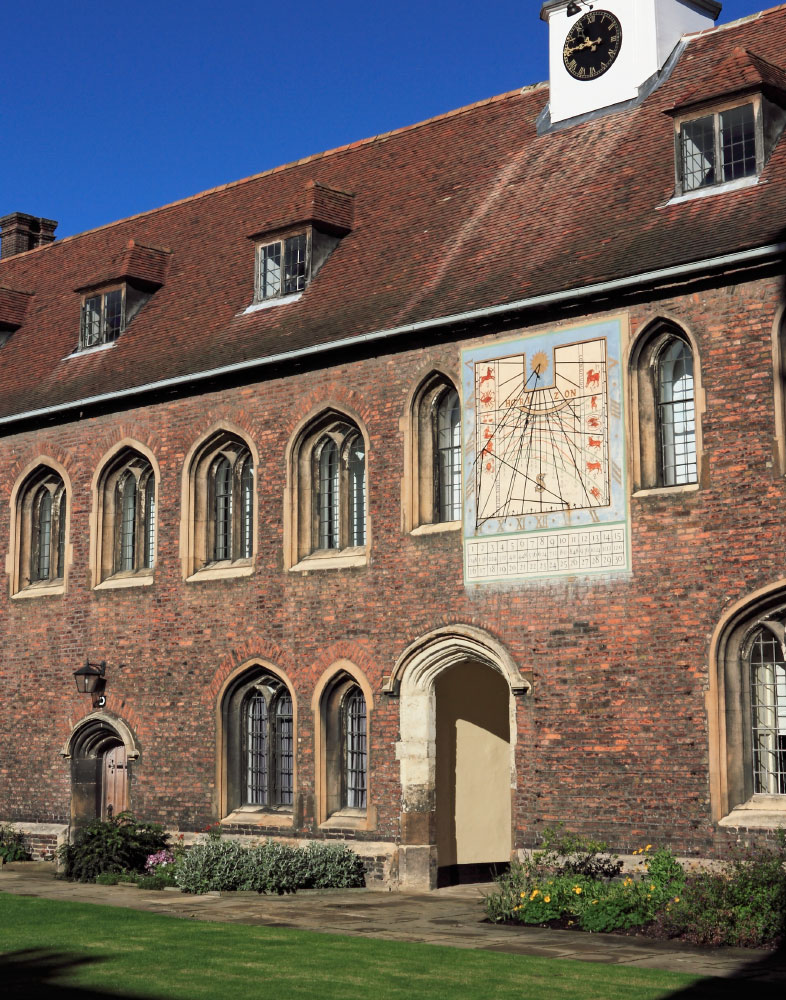
Sundial at Queens' College, Cambridge, designed by John Ponet

== Edwardian reformer ==
By November 1548, Ponet had married, though the Parliament of England had not yet removed the ban on clerical marriage. In the power struggles of the early reign of Edward VI, he was a supporter of Edward Seymour, Duke of Somerset, and suspicious of his rival the Earl of Warwick (later the Duke of Northumberland). Following Somerset's fall from political power, Ponet was arrested in November 1549, perhaps in connection with his translation from Ochino, which flattered Somerset and was dedicated to him.

By spring 1550 Ponet was rehabilitated, and preached before the king. In March 1550, he was nominated as bishop of Rochester, and was consecrated at Lambeth Palace on 29 June. In January 1551, he was appointed to a commission to investigate anabaptists in Kent.

On 8 March 1551 Ponet was appointed to the see of Winchester, replacing Stephen Gardiner. As a diocesan he agreed a reduction in the income of the see, to the benefit of the government. His own salary fell to £1300 compared to £3000 for his predecessor.

== Marian exile ==
In 1553, the Roman Catholic Mary I succeeded to the English throne. With the group of nearly 800 others, Protestants and mainly of higher social status, Ponet and his wife left for continental Europe. Ponet was the highest-ranking ecclesiastic among the Marian exiles. His exact movements are still a matter of debate, however. As a married man, he was deprived of his bishopric. John Stow claimed that during Wyatt's rebellion in early 1554, Ponet participated in the uprising. He is known to have been in Strasbourg after the rebellion's defeat with his wife. A child was born to them later in 1554, and they were granted citizenship in February 1555. Peter Carew, who was one of the rebels, took refuge with Ponet at Strasburg.

Ponet died at Strasburg in August 1556.

== Works ==
=== A Shorte Treatise of Politike Power ===
Ponet rejected outright the idea that the King was ordained by God to rule his Church on Earth. His major work was A Shorte Treatise of Politike Power (1556), in which he put forward a theory of justified opposition to secular rulers. Ponet had used the library of Peter Martyr Vermigli, a less radical resistance theorist. The work justified tyrannicide. The Treatise was a seminal volume that later political philosophers such as John Locke expanded on, and influenced John Adams. An anonymous work, it had seven chapters, and a conclusion, and proposed a radical resistance theory, of the Calvinist type and based on biblical exemplars. Chapter VII, What Confidence is to be Given to Princes and Potentates, published the murder story Arden of Faversham.

This work also presented some recent political history, in Ponet's account of the palace revolution of 1549, and the fall of Somerset. He held responsible, as supporters of John Dudley (then Earl of Warwick), Thomas Wriothesley, 1st Earl of Southampton, Henry FitzAlan, 19th Earl of Arundel, and Richard Southwell. It did not accord any legitimacy to Dudley's subsequent attempt to displace Mary Tudor from the succession. Its contemporary focus was not on secular politics, but the church powers of the Marian bishops.

=== Clerical marriage ===
In 1549 Ponet dedicated a work defending clerical marriage to the Duke of Somerset. This work, A Defense for marriage of priests by scripture and auncient writers proved, was one of the most comprehensive works on the subject written in the English reformation. It used examples of scriptural allowance of marriage, scriptural figures who married and early Church figures who married or permitted it to priests to argue priests should be able to marry. In October 2013 a manuscript A Traictise declarying and plainly prouying, that the pretensed marriage of Priestes … is no mariage (1554), from the Mendham Collection and sold by the Law Society, was barred from export by Ed Vaizey. It contains the views on clerical marriage of Stephen Gardiner, and those of Ponet. In 1556 appeared An Apologie Fully Answeringe ... a Blasphemous Book, an answer to A Defence of Priestes Mariages by Thomas Martyn. It was published after Ponet's death by Matthew Parker, whose role may have been largely editorial.

=== Other works ===
In 1549 also, Ponet published A Trageodie, or, Dialogue of the Unjust Usurper Primacy of the Bishop of Rome, a translation of a work by Bernardino Ochino. It argued against the Primacy of the Bishop of Rome; and in claiming the Papacy had fallen into heresy, may have been intended to undermine expectations of the effectiveness of the Council of Trent, convened from 1545, by proposing that conciliarism was a dead letter. It contained also Cranmer's reasoning on the Pope as Antichrist.

A catechism added by Ponet to the 42 Articles of 1553 formed the basis of a later catechism of Alexander Nowell (1570). It was commissioned from Ponet by John Dudley, 1st Duke of Northumberland. A translation by Michaelangelo Florio (1553) was the first Italian book published in England.

Other works attributed to Ponet are Diallecticon viri boni et literati (1557) which was edited by his friend Anthony Cooke, and translated into English by Elizabeth Hoby in 1605; and possibly An Answer unto a Crafty and Sophistical Cavillation (1550) as ghost-writer for Cranmer. The Diallecticon, an anonymous publication, was an irenical discussion of the Eucharistic controversy within the Protestant churches. The work was edited in 1688 by Edward Pelling. William Goode in the 19th century argued that earlier attributions to Cooke were correct.

== Family ==
Ponet married twice. In July 1551, his first wife was found by a consistory court at St Paul's Cathedral to have a legal pre-contract marriage to a butcher and he was forced to divorce her and compensate him. He married his second wife, Maria Hayman, on 25 October of the same year; she was the daughter of one of the Archbishop Thomas Cranmer's financial officers. After his death, having sold his books to Anthony Cooke, Mary Ponet had to apologise to Peter Martyr, some of whose volumes were in the sale.

== Notes ==
Church of England titles
Preceded by Nicholas Ridley	Bishop of Rochester; 1550–1551	Succeeded by John Scory
Preceded by Stephen Gardiner	Bishop of Winchester; 1551–1553	Succeeded by Stephen Gardiner
