= Pellino =

Pellino is an Italian surname. Notable people with the surname include:

- Gioele Pellino (born 1983), Italian motorcycle racer
- Giovanni Pellino (born 1967), also known as Neffa, Italian singer-songwriter, rapper, composer, producer and musician

== See also ==
- Pelling (surname)
