= John Croke (1508 or 1509 – between 1549 and 1551) =

English politician

John Croke (1508 or 1509 – between 1549 and 1551), was an English politician.

He was a member (MP) of the parliament of England for Hindon in 1547.
