= Silent information regulator protein =

Silent information regulator (SIR) proteins are involved in regulating gene expression. SIR proteins organize heterochromatin near telomeres, ribosomal DNA (rDNA), and at silent loci including hidden mating type loci in yeast. The SIR family of genes encodes catalytic and non-catalytic proteins that are involved in de-acetylation of histone tails and the subsequent condensation of chromatin around a SIR protein scaffold. Some SIR family members are conserved from yeast to humans.

== History ==
SIR proteins have been identified in many screens, and have historically been known as SIR (silent information regulator), MAR (mating-type regulator), STE (sterile), CMT (change of mating type) or SSP (sterile suppressor) according to which screen led to their identification. Ultimately, the name SIR had the most staying power, because it most accurately describes the function of the encoded proteins.

One of the early yeast screens to identify SIR genes was performed by Anita Hopper and Benjamin Hall, who screened with mutagenesis for alleles that allow sporulation in a normally sporulation-deficient heterothallic α/α (ho/ho MATα/MATα). Their screen identified a mutation in a novel gene that was not linked to HO that allowed the α/α diploid to sporulate, as if it were an α/a diploid, and inferred that the mutation affected a change in mating type by an HO-independent mechanism. Later, it was discovered at the CMT allele identified by Hopper & Hall did not cause a mating type conversion at the MAT locus, but rather allowed the expression of cryptic mating type genes that are silenced in wild-type yeast. In their paper clarifying the mechanism of the CMT mutation, Haber and acknowledge the contribution of Amar Klar, who presented his MAR mutant strains that had similar properties as the CMT mutants at the Cold Spring Harbor Laboratory yeast genetics meeting, which led Haber and to consider the hypothesis that the cmt mutants may act by de-repressing silent information.

In the same year that Haber & demonstrated that the cmt mutant restores sporulation by de-repressing hidden mating type loci, two other groups published screens for genes involved in the regulation of silent mating type cassettes. The first study, performed by Amar Klar, Seymour Fogel and Kathy Macleod, identified a mutation in a spontaneous a/a diploid that caused the products of sporulation to be haploids with an apparent diploid phenotype, as assayed by ability to mate. The authors reasoned that the mutation caused the de-repression of then-recently appreciated silent mating type loci HMa and HMα, which would allow an a/a diploid to sporulate and would cause haploid segregants inheriting the mutant allele to behave as a/α diploids despite being haploid. The authors named the mutation MAR for its apparent role in mating type regulation, and were able to map the mutation to chromosome IV, and determined that it was located 27.3 cM from a commonly used trp1 marker.

A few months later, Jasper Rine and Ira Herskowitz published a different screen for genes that affect the ability of yeast to mate, and ultimate discovered the gene family that they called SIR, a name that remains in the modern parlance. Unlike the Klar et al. screen that identified a mutant by its inability to mate, Rine & Herskowitz took a more directed approach towards discovering factors responsible for mating type silencing. Specifically, Rine & Herskowitz reasoned that a haploid yeast cell with a recessive mutation in matα1 could be complemented if the silent copy of MATα were de-repressed. Starting in a ho matα1 haploid strain, Rine & Herskowitz screened mutants arising from mutagenesis and identified five mutants that restored a MATα phenotype in matα cells, but were not linked to the MAT locus and did not cause a gene conversion between the HMα locus and matα. These mutants, they reasoned, were specifically defective in silencing the cryptic mating type genes.

Eventually, all of the mutants resulting from the original Hopper & Hall screen as well as the later Rine & Herskowitz screen and the Klar et al. screen were characterized and mapped, and it was shown that the causative genes were the same. In fact, the genes that are now referred to as SIR1-4 have at one time been referred to as MAR, CMT or STE according to the screen that identified the mutants.

Although Klar, Hartwell and Hopper identified mutations in SIR genes and applied other names to the genes before Rine performed his screen, the SIR name was eventually adopted because Rine eventually identified the most complete set of functionally related genes (SIR1-4), and because the work by Rine and Herskowitz most accurately described the function of the SIR family genes. Later it would be shown that in yeast and in higher organisms, SIR proteins are important for transcriptional regulation of many chromatin domains.

== Molecular mechanism ==
In budding yeast, SIR proteins are found at the silent mating type loci, telomeres, and at the rDNA locus. At the silent mating type loci and at the telomeres, SIR proteins participate in transcriptional silencing of genes within their domain of localization. At the rDNA locus, SIR proteins are thought to primarily be important for repressing recombination between rDNA repeats rather than for suppressing transcription.

=== Transcriptional silencing in budding yeast ===
In transcriptional silencing, SIR2,3,4 are required in stoichiometric amounts to silence specific chromosomal regions. In yeast, SIR proteins bind sites on nucleosome tails and form a multimeric compound of SIR2,3,4 that condenses chromatin and is thought to physically occlude promoters in the silenced interval, preventing their interaction with transcription machinery. The establishment of SIR-repressed heterochromatin domains is a complicated process that involves different subsets of proteins and regulatory proteins depending on the locus in the genome. At the silent mating type loci and at yeast telomeres, the transcription factors Abf1 (ARS binding factor) and Rap1 (repressor-activator protein) associate with specific nucleotide sequences in the silencers that flank heterochromatic regions. Rap1 contains a Sir3-binding domain that recruits SIR3 to the silencers. Once at the silencers, Sir3 recruits Sir4-Sir2 dimers to the chromatin nucleation site. Sir2 then deacetylates histone H3 and H4 tails, and free Sir3 binds the now-deacetylated lysine residues H4K16,79, and recruits additional Sir4-Sir2 dimers to promote the further spreading of the heterochromatin domain.

Once it has spread to cover a genomic locus, the SIR2,3,4 effectively prevents transcription from the region it occupies, in a process that is thought to depend on the physical occlusion of DNA by SIR proteins. Recently, it has been shown that certain promoters are capable of directing transcription inside regions that are otherwise silenced by SIR proteins. Specifically, if an inducible promoter is induced inside a silent chromatin domain, it can achieve ~200x increase in expression levels with little detectable change in covalent histone modifications.

SIR spreading is thought to occur linearly from the silencer element.

=== Roles and interactions between SIR proteins ===
==== SIR2 ====
SIR2 is an NAD-dependent lysine deacetylase. It was the first-discovered member of the Sirtuin protein family and it is highly conserved, with homologs found in organisms ranging from humans to bacteria and archaea. It interacts with a variety of protein substrates, but does not exhibit strong affinity for DNA, chromatin, or other silencer-binding factors. Instead, it relies on other SIR proteins to find its appropriate silencing target.

In the SIR protein complex, SIR2 removes acetyl groups from the lysine on histone tails H3 and H4, 'priming' the nucleosome for chromatin packaging by the SIR3 component of the complex.

===== Stabilization of rDNA in budding yeast =====
Beyond its canonical role in the SIR complex, SIR2 also plays a role in rDNA repression. As part of the cell's regulation mechanism, rDNA repeats are excised from the chromosome so they cannot be expressed. SIR2 forms a complex with NET1 (a nuclear protein) and CDC14 (a phosphatase) to form the regulator of nucleolar silencing and telophase (RENT) complex. The RENT complex sequesters excised rDNA in 'extrachromosomal circles,' preventing recombination. Accumulation of these circles has been linked to premature aging. Sirtuin 2 (SIRT2), SIR2's human analog, has also been linked to age-related disease.

==== SIR3 ====
SIR3 is principally involved in heterochromatin spreading, the silencing activity of the SIR protein complex. When overexpressed, SIR3 leads to spreading beyond the normal nucleation site. SIR3 can continue to operate at very low levels of SIR2 and SIR4, but not without them. It preferentially binds to unmodified nucleosomes (no acetylation at H4K16 or methylation at H3K79), and relies on SIR2's deacetylation of H4K16 to enhance silencing. H3K79 methylation by DOT1 methyltransferase inhibits SIR3, resulting in an unsilenced chromatin region. SIR3 is recruited to target sequence by the transcription factors RAP1 or ABF1.

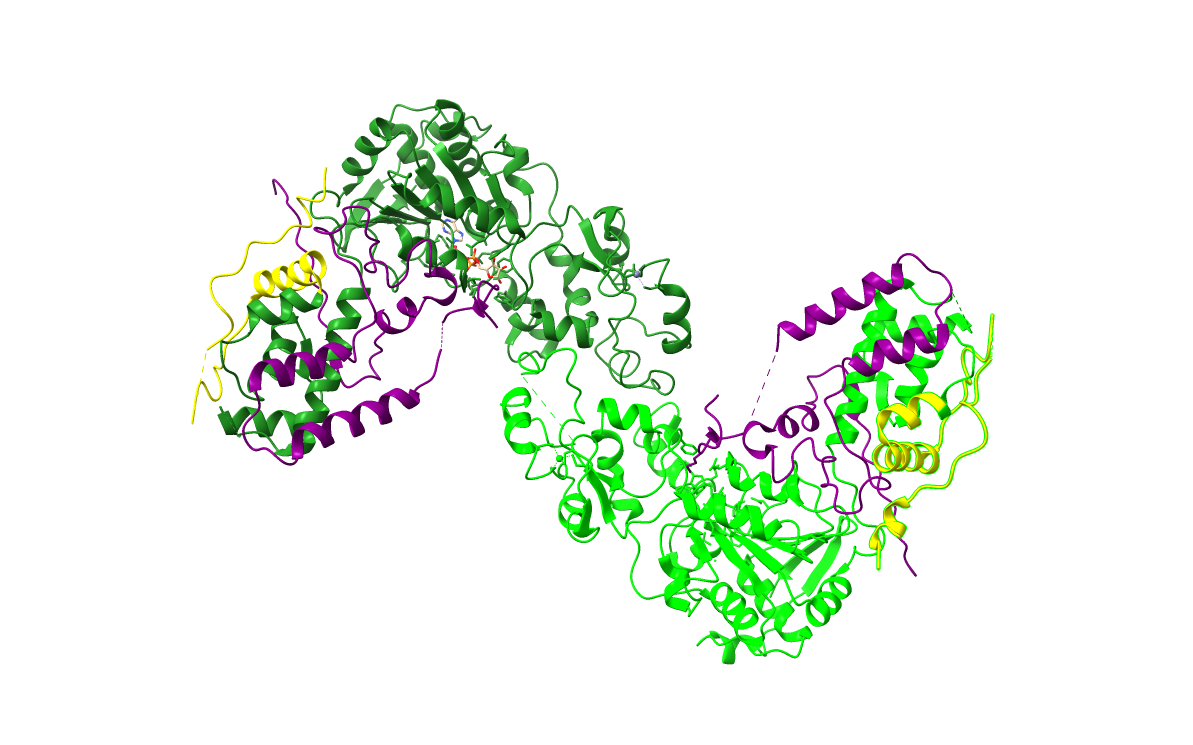
SIR2 homodimer (green) in complex with SIR4's (purple) SIR2-interacting domain (SID;yellow)

==== SIR4 ====
SIR4 is involved in scaffolding the assembly of silenced chromatin. It binds to DNA with high affinity, but low specificity. It is most stable when co-expressed with SIR2, but neither SIR2 nor SIR3 are required for it to operate at the telomeres. Each half of the SIR4 protein has distinct responsibilities in heterochromatin spreading. SIR4's N-terminus is required for telomeric silencing, but not for homothallic mating-type (HM) silencing. Conversely, its C-terminus supports HM but not telomeric repression. The N-terminus is positively charged and can be recruited to the telomeric repression site by SIR1 and YKU80. The C-terminus contains the coiled-coil region, which interacts with SIR3 in the heterotrimeric SIR complex and can also interact with RAP1 and YKU70 for recruitment to the telomeric region of the chromosome. The C-terminus also contains the SIR2-interacting domain (SID), where SIR4 can bind to the extended N-terminus of SIR2. SIR2 can catalyze reactions without being bound to SIR4, but SIR2's catalytic activity is enhanced when interacting with SIR4.

== Conservation ==
SIR proteins are conserved from yeast to humans, and lend their name to a class of mammalian histone deacetylases (Sirtuins, homologs of Sir2). Sirtuins have been implicated in myriad human traits including Alzheimer's and diabetes, and have been proposed to regulate of lifespan.

== See also ==
- Yeast mating
- Saccharomyces cerevisiae
- Centromere
- Computational epigenetics
- DNA methylation
- Epigenomics
- Histone code
- Human genome
- Molecular biology
- Position-effect variegation
