= John Pelling =

John Pelling may refer to:

- John Pelling (artist) (born 1930), British artist and clergyman
- John Pelling (canon) (1670–1750), British clergyman and Canon of Windsor
- John Pelling (fencer) (1936–2023), British fencer
