= Pachysolen tannophilus =

Scientific classification
- Kingdom: Fungi
- Division: Ascomycota
- Class: Pichiomycetes
- Order: Alaninales
- Family: Pachysolenaceae
- Genus: Pachysolen
- Species: P. tannophilus

Binomial name
- Pachysolen tannophilus Boidin & Adzet (1957)

Synonyms
- Pachysolen pelliculatus Boidin & Adzet (1957); Hansenula tannophila (Boidin & Azet) Campbell (1973)

Species of fungus

Pachysolen is a genus of yeast discovered from sulfite liquor by Boidin and Adzet (1957) and isolated by Wickerham (1970).

The genus is monotypic, containing the single species Pachysolen tannophilus, the first yeast identified to have a high capacity for production of ethanol from xylose.
