= Prepro-alpha-factor =

Prepro-alpha-factor is a precursor to alpha-factor secreted by MAT alpha Saccharomyces cerevisiae, which is a small peptide mating pheromone. Prepro-alpha-factor is translocated into the endoplasmic reticulum and glycosylated at three sites as part of the chemical reaction leading to the formation of the alpha-factor.
