= Hindon (constituency) =

Parliamentary constituency in the United Kingdom, 1448–1832

- Former borough constituency for the House of Commons

1448–1832
- Seats: Two

Hindon was a parliamentary borough consisting of the village of Hindon in Wiltshire, which elected two Members of Parliament (MPs) to the House of Commons from 1448 until the borough was abolished by the Reform Act 1832. It was one of the most notoriously corrupt of the rotten boroughs, and bills to disfranchise Hindon were debated in Parliament on two occasions before its eventual abolition.

== History ==
Hindon was a small market town, and may have been of at least minor importance at the time it was first represented in Parliament, during the reign of Henry VI. However, the town was destroyed by a disastrous fire in 1754, and over the same period its trade went into severe decline. By 1831, the population of the borough was only 921, and the borough and town contained 185 houses.

=== Franchise and influences ===
Hindon was an example of the class of constituencies known as potwalloper boroughs, the right to vote being exercised by every householder, a household being notionally defined as any dwelling place with a separate hearth capable of heating a pot – this meant in effect that the majority of the adult male population could vote. The precise regulations in these constituencies varied, but in Hindon the franchise was defined by a House of Commons ruling of 1728 as resting with all inhabitant householders who were parishioners of Hindon and not receiving alms. At the final contested election, that of 1831, it was estimated that these amounted to 170 eligible voters, and 112 actually voted. The local magnates were generally recognised as "patrons" of the borough, and had considerable influence over the choice of MPs; however, Hindon's voters were amenable only at a price, and were frequently prepared to sell the borough's seats to the highest bidder should rival candidates present themselves. In the late 17th century, the Howe family were pre-eminent, and were joined by the Calthorpes who were Lords of the Manor; both frequently chose to keep the seats for themselves or for a family member. The Howe influence faded in the early 18th century, and from 1745 Lord Calthorpe was effectively joined as patron by William Beckford, the wealthy Jamaica planter and London alderman who in that year bought nearby Fonthill Abbey.

=== John Story ===
One of Hindon's most remarkable members was John Story, Regius Professor of Civil Law at the University of Oxford. Elected at Hindon in 1547, he gained notoriety by his opposition to the Act of Uniformity in 1548. After he had called out "Woe unto thee, O land, when thy king is a child," Story was imprisoned on the orders of the House of Commons, but was soon released and fled to the Seventeen Provinces. The reign of Queen Mary I from 1553 to 1558 brought him back into public life and he again became a member of parliament, but after Mary's death he opposed the Act of Supremacy 1559, was imprisoned again, escaped, was recaptured, fled again to the Low Countries, where he became a subject of King Philip II of Spain, was kidnapped by agents of Queen Elizabeth I, was imprisoned in the Tower of London, where he was tortured, and finally in 1571 was hanged, drawn and quartered. He was beatified by Pope Leo XIII in 1886.

Story's successor as Regius Professor of Civil Law at Oxford, William Aubrey, was elected a member for Hindon in 1559.

=== History of bribery ===
With an electorate as large as Hindon's, usually amounting to a couple of hundred voters, the hold of the patrons was precarious at the best of times, but was weakened still further when they were competing with each other in the hope of nominating both MPs. An early example of such rivalry was the election of 1697, when Reynolds Calthorpe petitioned to overturn his defeat by Colonel Henry Lee on the grounds of the "undue practices of one Sir James How, who pretended to stand, and spent a great deal of money in treats; but at the time of the election set up Col. Lee, whom the bailiff hath returned." Calthorpe later withdrew his petition and was shortly afterwards elected together with Howe, but it was then the turn of their two defeated opponents, Robert Hyde and George Morley, to bring a petition complaining of "several indirect and unlawful practices at and before the election".

=== First escape from disfranchisement, 1702 ===
No report of the outcome of the 1698 petition is recorded, and it may have been withdrawn. The resolution of petitions at this period was frequently conducted on an entirely partisan basis, the outcome being dependent on which side could command a majority in the Commons. At the election of 1701, the candidates once more were Sir James Howe, Reynolds Calthorpe and George Morley. According to the result as declared by the bailiff (the local official who acted as ex officio returning officer), Morley was defeated, beaten into third place by Calthorpe by 70 votes to 62. Morley petitioned against Calthorpe's election, as did some of the voters, complaining that the votes of some of Calthorpe's supporters should not have been accepted since they did not pay scot and lot. (This was a necessary condition for the franchise in many other boroughs.) After consideration, the committee agreed with Calthorpe that the right to vote in Hindon was not tied to payment of scot and lot, and therefore that the petition was not justified on those grounds.

The committee then began to look into the accusations of bribery. A number of witnesses stated that voters had been paid twenty shillings each to vote for Calthorpe, including a number who admitted that they themselves had received such a sum. Witnesses were also produced who said they had accepted even larger sums to vote for Morley. The committee's report to the Commons recommended that neither Calthorpe nor Morley should be accepted as duly elected. However, the House voted down the motion against Morley and he was therefore able to take his seat as an MP.

The following year the accusations were renewed, and the Commons voted that Morley should defend himself in the House against the accusation of bribery during his election. After his accuser, Thomas Jervoise, named seven agents who had assisted Morley in his corrupt practices and a petition against Morley from the unbribed voters of Hindon was presented, another vote was taken and this time the majority was in favour of invalidating Morley's election. However, they now went much further, proposing a bill to disfranchise Hindon altogether. This was not quite unprecedented (a similar measure had been proposed, unsuccessfully, for Stockbridge in 1689), but no such threat had ever been put into effect. In committee, the bill was amended so that rather than abolishing the borough outright it should be "thrown into the hundred" – that is, the boundaries of the borough would be extended to take in the whole of the neighbouring hundred of Downton, which would have abolished the borough in all but name, turning it into a much larger constituency where the majority of votes were cast on the land-owning franchise used in the counties. In this form the bill passed the Commons; but the House of Lords voted against it, so it could not become law. (Ironically, the man elected to fill the vacant seat after this reprieve was Thomas Jervoise.)

=== The election of "General Gold", 1774 ===
Following this narrow escape, Hindon continued in its corrupt routine, candidates needing to spend considerable sums to secure election. For example, the accounts of Prime Minister Newcastle, detailed by Namier, show £313 11s was spent on backing the government candidate in the Hindon by-election of 1756, William Mabbott, even though the contest was eventually not carried to a poll. Mabbott was apparently prepared to put up another £1000 of his own money if necessary.

In the second half of the 18th century, however, the political climate once more began to turn against open corruption, with Hindon's co-patron William Beckford (who sat as MP for the City of London) being one of the leading spirits in the reform movement. The Hindon election of 1774, when little attempt seems to have been made to conceal the scale of the bribery, was among the most serious cases to come to light, and one of only two where the House of Commons itself voted to prosecute the miscreants (rather than leaving the matter to the normal legal processes).

Richard Smith, a local man who had made a fortune in India and was prepared to spend high to get into Parliament, began his campaign anonymously, a local parson distributing five guineas a man to voters to persuade them to support "General Gold". Another candidate, the radical Thomas Brand Hollis, also appeared to challenge the Beckford and Calthorpe interest, while William Thomas Beckford, eccentric son of the original purchaser of Fonthill, and James Calthorpe were the family candidates. By polling day, Smith, Brand Hollis and Calthorpe had each distributed 15 guineas a head; Beckford had given promises only (though that, of course, was just as illegal as actually paying out money).

After Smith and Brand Hollis topped the poll, Beckford and Calthorpe petitioned against the result. The committee declared the election void, and recommended that all four candidates should be prosecuted for bribery; the House accepted the committee's report, and ordered that the Attorney General should prosecute and that no writ should be issued for a new election, so the borough's representation was suspended. Furthermore, a bill was introduced which would have disfranchised 190 of Hindon's 210 voters (listed by name), and thrown the borough into the hundred. This was no longer unthinkable: the same punishment had been visited on the Sussex borough of New Shoreham for corruption three years earlier, and in the following decade was applied in Wiltshire to remedy the misdemeanours of Cricklade. In this case, however, the proposal met considerable opposition and was eventually dropped, so Hindon survived again and a writ for a new election was issued.

At the new by-election, five candidates were nominated, and Smith was once again victorious together with Henry Dawkins; but, on petition, Smith was unseated once more. In the meanwhile, the bribery prosecution had proceeded, and both Smith and Brand Hollis had been convicted at Salisbury assizes, though Beckford and Calthorpe had been acquitted. Sentencing had been postponed, but a month after the second election both the offenders were fined £500 and jailed for six months.

=== Abolition ===
Hindon was abolished as a constituency by the Reform Act 1832, after which Hindon became part of the South Wiltshire county division for subsequent elections.

== Members of Parliament ==
=== 1448–1640 ===
Parliament	First member	Second member
1449	John Rokes	John Troutbeck
1450	William Twynyho	
1453	Robert Tylney	
1455	Robert Tylney	
1478	Sir William Danvers	
1491	William Baynham	
1510–1523	No names known	
1529	Sir John Hynde	John Baldwin
1536	?Thomas Lee	?Sir Ralph Sadler
1539	?	
1542	?	
1545	?	
1547	John Story, disqualified and repl. 1549 by John Zouche then 1552 by John Sturgeon	?John Croke
1553 (Mar)	?	
1553 (Oct)	William Rastell	Oliver Vachell
1554 (Apr)	Thomas Martyn	John Bekinsau
1554 (Nov)	Thomas Martyn	John Heywood
1555	Thomas Martyn	John Bekinsau
1558	John Gibbon	Henry Jones
1559–1563	William Aubrey|-	Henry Jones
1562–3	John Foster	George Acworth
1571	Miles Sandys, sat for Lancaster, replaced by Thomas Dabridgecourt	Richard Polsted
1584	Valentine Dale, sat for Chichester replaced by John Marvyn	Richard Zouche
1586	John Marvyn	Richard Cosin
1589	John Marvyn	John Lyly
1593	Francis Zouche	Abraham Hartwell
1597	James Marvyn	Henry Jackman
1601	Thomas Thynne	George Paule
1604–1611	Sir Edmund Ludlow	Thomas Thynne
1614	Sir Edmund Ludlow	Sir Edwin Sandys, sat for Rochester repl. by (Sir) Henry Mervyn
1620	John Anketill	John Davies sat for Newcastle-under-Lyme repl. 1621 by (Sir) Henry Mervyn
1624	Lawrence Hyde	Matthew Davies
1625	Sir Thomas Thynne	Thomas Lambert
1626	Sir Thomas Thynne	Thomas Lambert
1628–1629	Sir Thomas Thynne	Lawrence Hyde
1629–1640	No Parliaments summoned	

=== 1640–1832 ===
Year	First member	First party	Second member	Second party
April 1640	George Garrard		Sir Miles Fleetwood	
November 1640	Robert Reynolds	Parliamentarian	Sir Miles Fleetwood	
1641	Robert Reynolds	Parliamentarian	Thomas Bennett	Royalist
1644	Robert Reynolds	Parliamentarian	Bennett disabled from sitting – seat vacant	
1645	Robert Reynolds	Parliamentarian	Disputed election not resolved – seat left vacant	
1653	Hindon was unrepresented in the Barebones Parliament and the First and Second Parliaments of the Protectorate			
January 1659	Edmund Ludlow		Edward Tooker	
May 1659	Robert Reynolds		One seat vacant	
April 1660	Sir George Howe		Sir Thomas Thynne	
1661	Sir George Howe		Edward Seymour	Tory
1677	Robert Hyde		Edward Seymour	Tory
February 1679	Richard Howe		Thomas Lambert	
August 1679	Richard Howe		Sir Richard Howe	
1681	John Thynne		Sir Richard Howe	
1685	Robert Hyde		Thomas Lambert	
1689	Robert Hyde		John Milner	
1690	Robert Hyde		Thomas Chafin	
1691	Robert Hyde		The Viscount Fitzhardinge	
1695	Robert Hyde		Sir Charles Morley	
1697	Robert Hyde		Colonel Henry Lee	
1698	Reynolds Calthorpe		Sir James Howe	
May 1701	George Morley		Sir James Howe	
November 1701	George Morley		Reynolds Calthorpe	
1702	George Morley		Sir James Howe	
1704	Thomas Jervoise		Sir James Howe	
1705	George Morley		Reynolds Calthorpe	
1708	Sir James Howe		Edmund Lambert	
1709	Reynolds Calthorpe		Edmund Lambert	
1710	George Morley		Edmund Lambert	
1711	Henry Lee Warner		Edmund Lambert	
1713	Reynolds Calthorpe, the younger		Richard Lockwood	
1715	Major-General George Wade		Reynolds Calthorpe	
1720	Major-General George Wade		Colonel John Pitt	
1722	Henry Ludlow Coker		Robert Gray	
1727	George Heathcote		Townsend Andrews	
1734	Stephen Fox		George Fox	
1735	Henry Fox		George Fox	
1741	Sir Henry Calthorpe		William Steele	
1747	Valens Comyn		Bisse Richards	
1751	Francis Blake Delaval		Bisse Richards	
1754	James Dawkins		Bisse Richards	
1756	James Dawkins		William Mabbott	
1758	James Calthorpe		William Mabbott	
1761	Professor William Blackstone		Edward Morant	
1768	John St Leger Douglas		William Hussey	
1774	Richard Smith		Thomas Brand Hollis	Radical
1775	Writ suspended – both seats vacant			
1776	Richard Smith		Henry Dawkins	
1777	Archibald Macdonald		Henry Dawkins	
1780	Lloyd Kenyon		Nathaniel Wraxall	
1784	William Egerton		Edward Bearcroft	
1790	William Beckford		James Adams	
1795	Thomas Wildman		James Adams	
February 1796	James Wildman		James Adams	
May 1796	James Wildman		Matthew Lewis	
1802	Thomas Wallace		John Pedley	
1806	William Beckford	Whig	Benjamin Hobhouse	Whig
1818	William Beckford	Whig	Frederick Gough	Whig
1820	John Plummer	Whig	Frederick Gough	Whig
1826	George Fortescue	Whig	Arthur Gough-Calthorpe	Whig
1830	George Fortescue	Whig	John Weyland	Whig
1831	Edward Stanley	Whig	John Weyland	Whig
1832	Constituency abolished			
