= Henry Jones (lawyer) =

Welsh lawyer and clergyman

Henry Jones (died 1592) was a Welsh lawyer and clergyman.

== Life ==
Jones was educated at Oxford University, becoming a Fellow of All Souls College in 1546, and obtaining degrees of BCL (1549) and DCL (1552). He became a member of Doctors' Commons in 1552 and, in 1554, became rector of Llanrwst. In 1560, he was appointed as a canon of St Asaph and was rector of Llansannan from 1561 to 1592. In 1558–1559, he was member of parliament for Hindon in Wiltshire. He had a high reputation as a lawyer and was one of the lawyers consulted by Elizabeth I on whether the Scottish bishop John Leslie could be tried in English courts for his activities whilst serving as ambassador for the Scottish queen. He died in February 1592 and was buried in St Benet's, Paul's Wharf, London.
