= Edward Pelling =

English cleric and academic

Edward Pelling (baptised 1640 – died 1718) was an English cleric and academic, a significant author in the first generation of High churchmen.

== Life ==
Pelling was born in Wiltshire, was educated at Westminster School, and was admitted on 3 July 1658 to Trinity College, Cambridge, becoming a scholar on 14 April 1659. He was elected minor fellow 1664, and major fellow in the following year. He graduated B.A. 1661–2, M.A. 1665, and D.D. on the occasion of William III's visit to Cambridge in October 1689.

From 11 May 1674 to the autumn of 1678 Pelling was vicar of St Helen's Bishopsgate, in London; from 1 October 1678 till the close of 1691 vicar of St Martin, Ludgate; from 3 May 1683 till his resignation on 4 July 1691 a prebendary of Westminster Abbey; and from 1691 rector of Petworth in Sussex. Before October 1679 he was chaplain to Charles Seymour, 6th Duke of Somerset. He was also chaplain in ordinary to William III and Mary II, and to Queen Anne. Pelling died on 19 March 1718. His son Thomas was elected from Westminster School to Christ Church, Oxford in 1689.

== Works ==
Pelling was a defender of the Church of England against both Roman Catholics and dissenters. He printed numerous sermons which he preached on public occasions, many before the king or the House of Lords at Westminster Abbey. Besides sermons, and a series of "practical discourses", he also published:

- Ancient and Modern Delusions discoursed of in Three Sermons upon 2 Thess. ii. 11, concerning some Errors now prevailing in the Church of Rome, London, 1679.
- The Good Old Way … London, 1680; a treatise aimed against concessions to dissenters for the sake of unity. This work became a High Church classic.
- The Apostate Protestant. A Letter to a Friend occasioned by the late reprinting of a Jesuit's Book about Succession to the Crown of England, pretended to have been written by R. Doleman, London, 1682; 2nd edition, 1685. An attack on the Exclusion Bill; R. Doleman is generally taken to be Robert Persons.
- The Antiquity of the Protestant Religion. … In a Letter to a Person of Quality’ London, 1687, 2 parts. In the British Library copy there follows a manuscript tract attacking Pelling's arguments concerning the "use of images", with Third and Fourth Letters to a Person of Quality vindicating them.
- A Discourse concerning the Existence of God, London, 1696; reissued in 1704, when the title-page describes it as an exposition of the principles of the Epicureans and Hobbists of our age". It is dedicated to Queen Anne. Part ii., issued separately, with same title-page, London, 1755.

Pelling edited in 1688 the Dialecticon of John Poynet.

== Notes ==
Attribution

This article incorporates text from a publication now in the public domain: Lee, Sidney, ed. (1895). "Pelling, Edward". Dictionary of National Biography. Vol. 44. London: Smith, Elder & Co.
