= Fus3 =

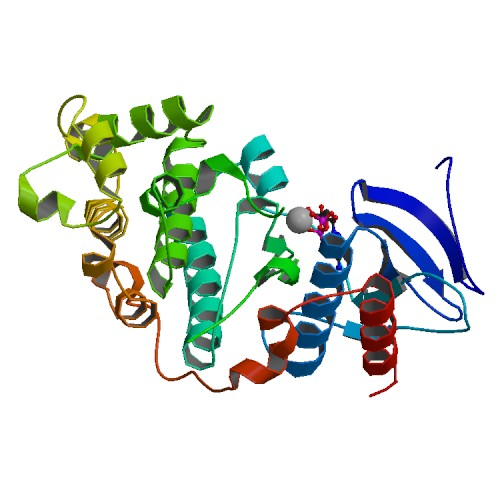
Crystal Structure of Fus3 MAP Kinase

Fus3 is a MAPK protein involved in the mating decision of yeast. The dissociation of Fus3 from scaffold protein Ste5 results in the switch-like mating decision observed in yeast. During this process, Fus3 competes with a phosphatase Ptc1, attempting to phosphorylate 4 key phosphorylation sites on Ste5. When all 4 sites on Ste5 have been dephosphorylated by Ptc1, Fus3 dissociates from Ste5 and trans locates to the nucleus.

One regulator of Fus3 is Ste5. Ste5 causes autophosphorylation of one of two locations modulated by the MAPK kinase Ste7 (the main activator of Fus3). This single phosphorylation causes Fus3 to phosphorylate Ste5 leading to a decrease in signal. However, Ste5 also selectively catalytically unlocks Fus3 for phosphorylation by Ste7. Both the catalytic domain on Ste5 as well as Ste7 must be present in order to activate Fus3, which helps to explain why Fus3 is only activated during the mating pathway, and remains inactive in other situations which use Ste7. When binding to Ste5 is disrupted, Fus3 behaves like its homologue Kss1, and the cells no longer respond to a gradient or mate efficiently with distant partners.

Fus3 is activated by Ste7 and its substrates include Ste12, Far1, Bni1, Sst2, Tec1, and Ste5. It can be localized to the cytoplasm, the mating projection tip, the nucleus, and the mitochondrion.

Fus3 also serves to phosphorylate repressor proteins Rst1 and Rst1 (Dig1 and Dig2 respectively) which results in promotion of Ste12 dependent transcription of mating-specific genes. It also activates Far1 which goes on to inhibit the cyclins CLN1 and CLN2 leading to cell-cycle arrest.

== Kss1 ==
Kss1, a functional homologue of Fus3, is not involved in the production of a shmoo. Kss mutants behave similarly to wild-type yeast cells with respect to their ability to shmoo. It has been shown that while Fus3 and Kss1 are functionally redundant, the substrates of the Fus3 protein may or may not be shared with Kss1. Instead, it has been found that the function of Fus3 is to regulate mating, while the function of Kss1 is to regulate filamentation and invasion. In the absence of Fus3, there can be errors in pathway communication which can result in Kss1 being activated by the mating pheromone.

Kss1 does not exhibit the ultrasensitivity that Fus3 does, but instead is activated rapidly and has a graded dose-response profile.

== Biological Processes ==
Fus3 is involved in the following biological processes:

- Cell cycle arrest
- Invasive growth in response to glucose limitation
- Negative regulation of MAPK cascade
- Negative regulation of transposition
- Pheromone-dependent signal transduction involved in conjugation with cellular fusion
- Positive regulation of protein export from the nucleus
- Protein phosphorylation

The closest human homolog to Fus3 is MAPK1 (ERK2)
