= George Acworth (politician) =

16th-century English politician

- Born: 1482
- Died: 1530 (aged 47–48)
- Occupation: politician

George Acworth (1482–1530), of Toddington, Bedfordshire, was an English politician.

== Career ==
Born by 1482, he was the first son of John Acworth of Luton and his 3rd wife Elizabeth, daughter of John Broughton of Toddington. He held the office of Justice of the Peace in Bedfordshire from 1515 until his death. He was a commander subsidy in 1523 and 1524, and servant of Cardinal Wolsey in 1523.

Acworth was a member of parliament for Bedfordshire in 1529. He died in 1530 and was buried near his father in the church at Luton.
