= November 1701 English general election =

General election in England

- November – December 1701

All 513 seats in the House of Commons 257 seats needed for a majority
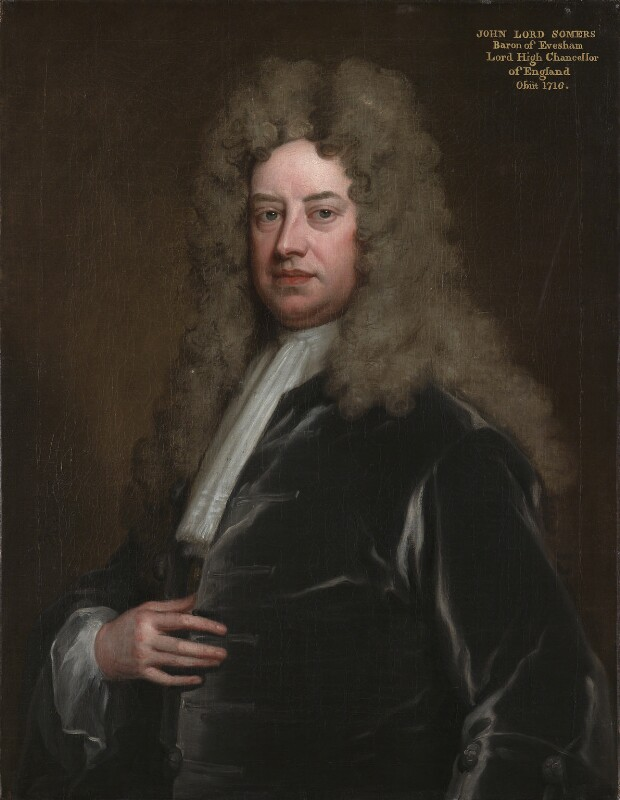

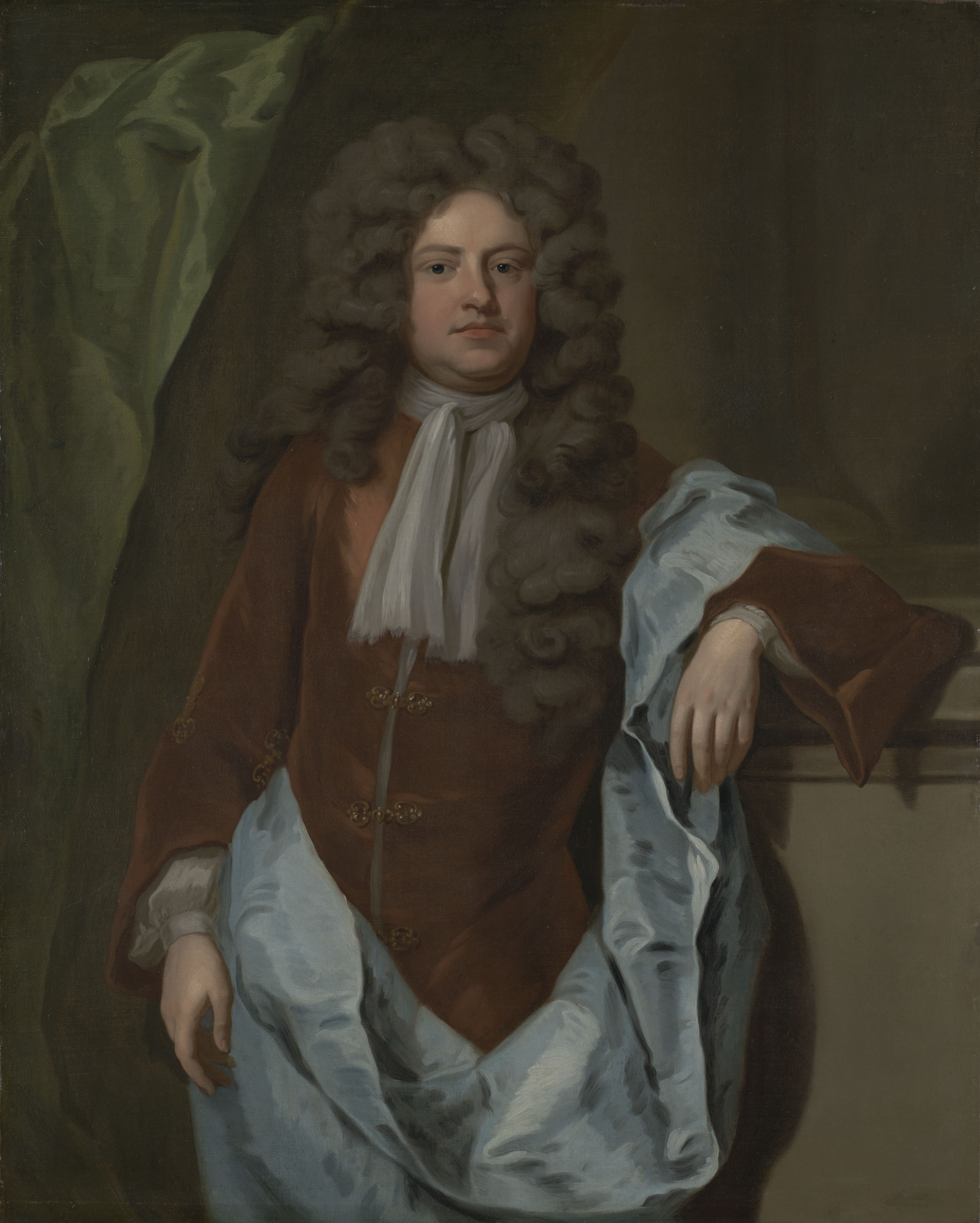

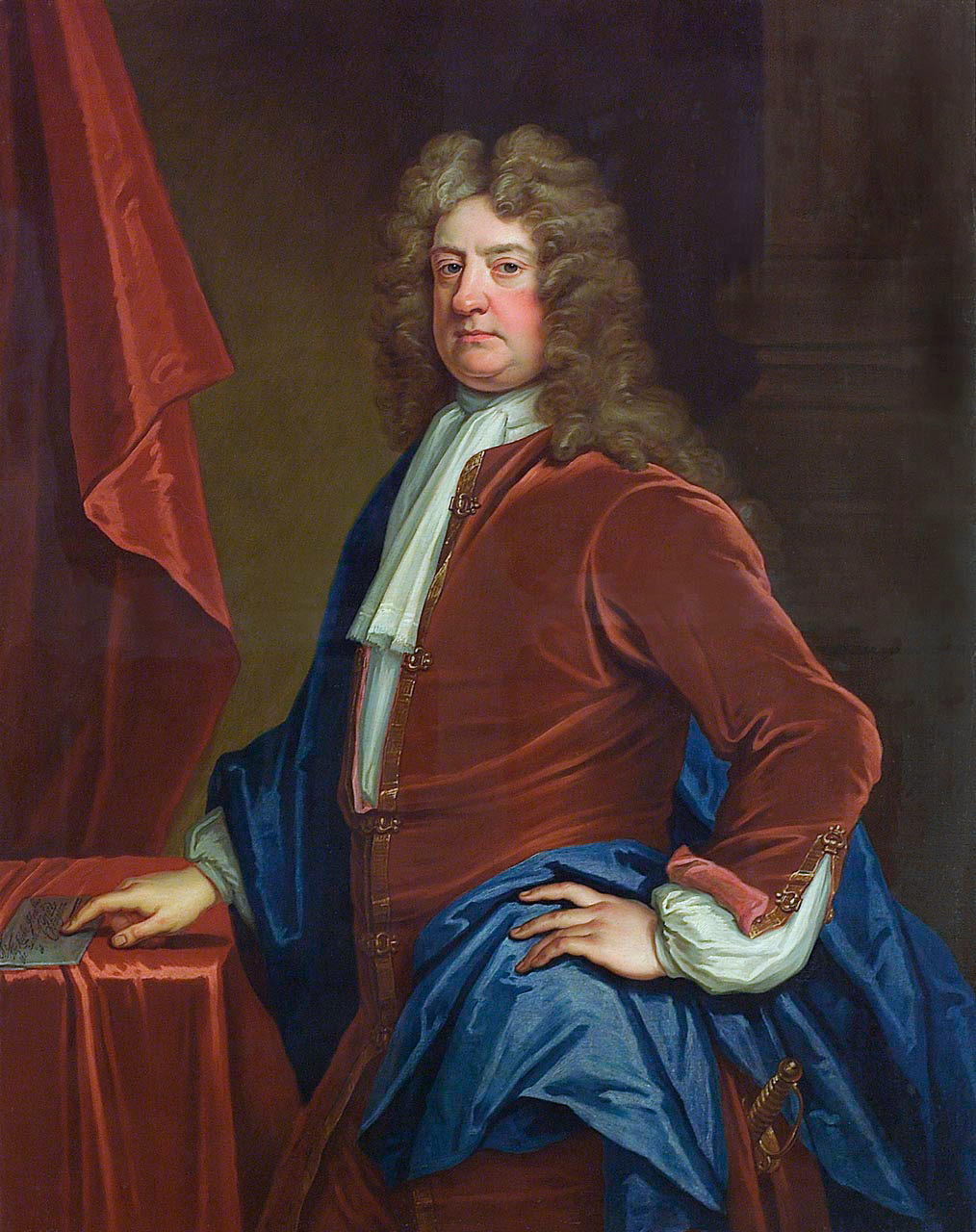

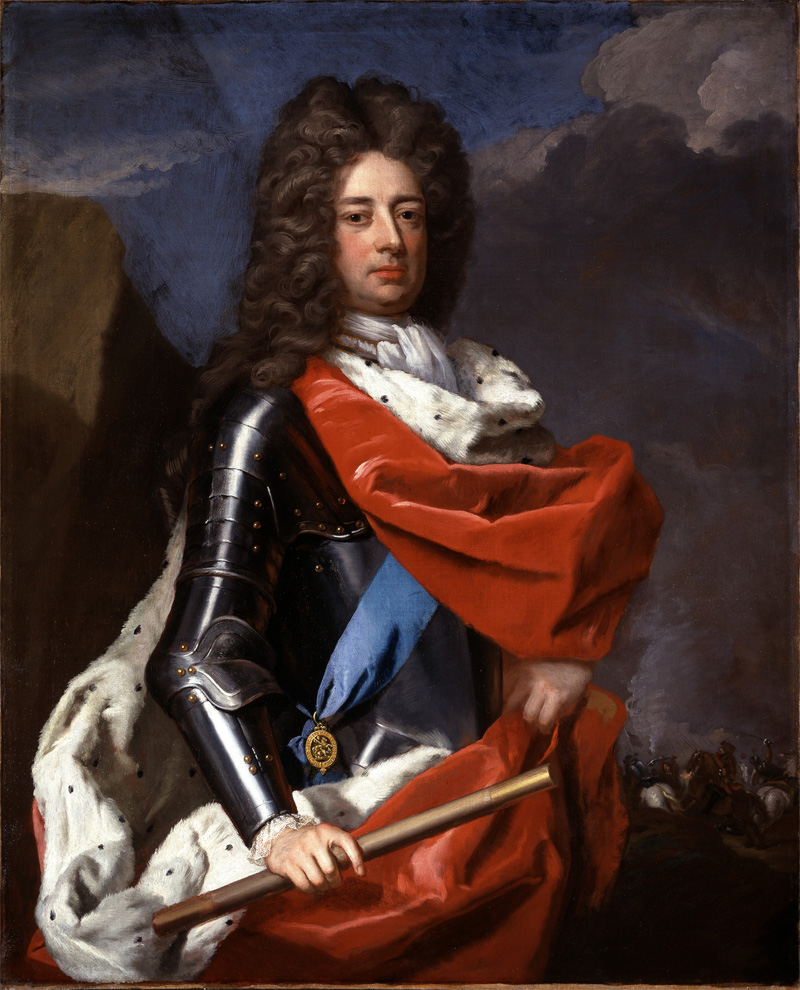

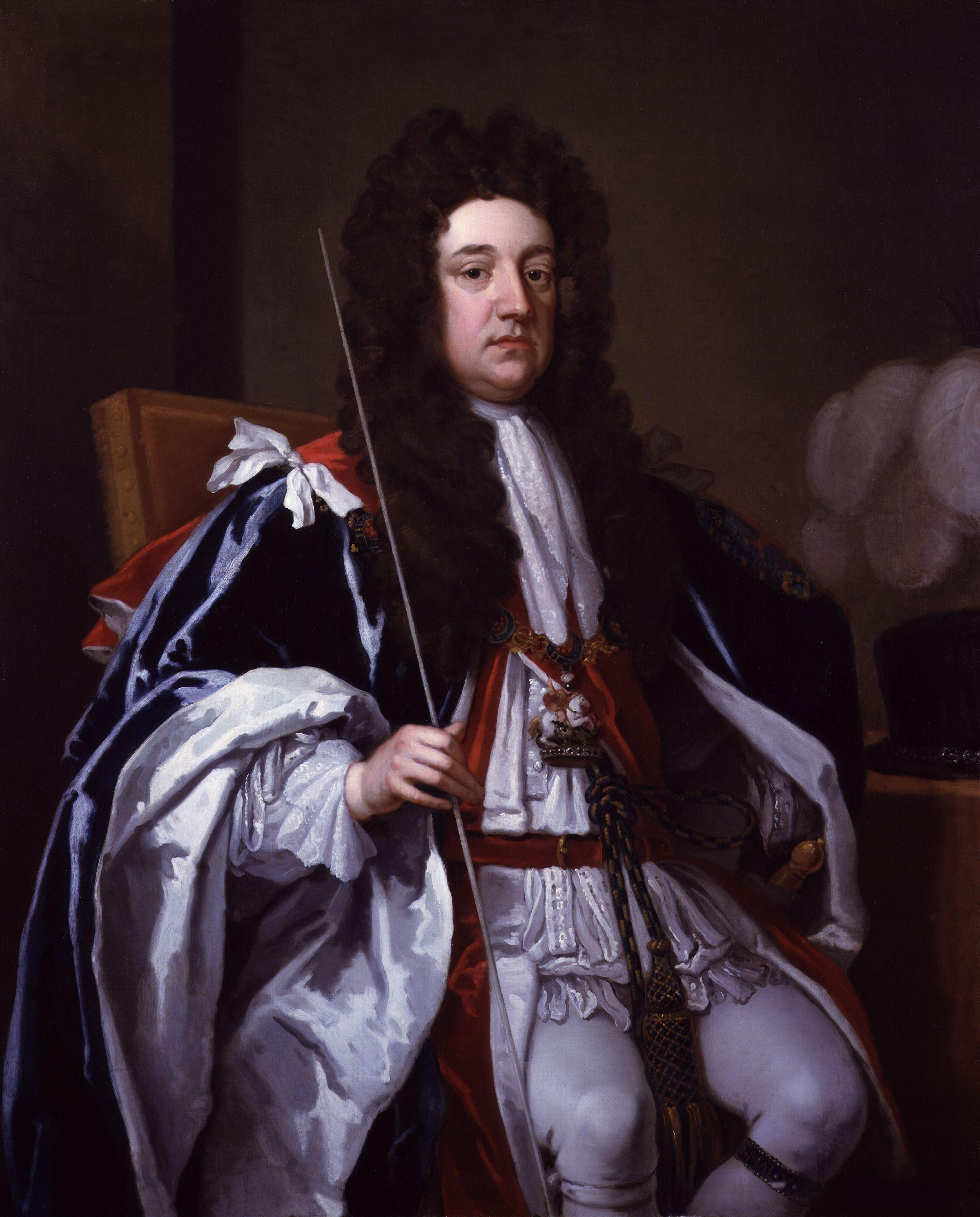
	First party	Second party
Leader	Whig Junto (Baron Somers, Baron Halifax, Baron Wharton)	Earl of Marlborough; Baron Godolphin
Party	Whig	Tory
Seats won	248	240
Seat change	▲29	▼9
- Composition of the House of Commons after the election

The English general election, which began in November 1701, produced substantial gains for the Whigs, who enthusiastically supported the war with France. The Tories had been criticised in the press for their ambivalence towards the war, and public opinion had turned against them; they consequently lost ground as a result of the election. Ninety-one constituencies, 34% of the total in England and Wales, were contested.

English Parliament of General Election 1701

== Summary of the constituencies ==
See 1796 British general election for details. The constituencies used in England and Wales were the same throughout the period. In 1707 alone the 45 Scottish members were not elected from the constituencies, but were returned by co-option of a part of the membership of the last Parliament of Scotland elected before the Union.

Party strengths are an approximation, with many MPs' allegiances being unknown.

== See also ==
- 6th Parliament of King William III
- List of parliaments of England
