= Reynolds Calthorpe =

English politician (1655–1719)

Reynolds Calthorpe of Elvetham in Hampshire (12 August 1655 in Ampton – 1719) was a Whig Member of Parliament for Hindon.

He was the third and youngest son of Sir James Calthorpe (died 1658) and Dorothy Reynolds, second daughter of Sir James Reynolds of Castle Camps, Cambridgeshire, and sister to Sir John Reynolds.

Calthorpe represented Hindon in the 4th (1698 – 13 May 1701) and 6th (1698 – 13 May 1701) Parliaments of William and Mary; the 2nd (1705–1708) Parliament of Ann; and the 1st (1707), 2nd (1708) and 5th (1715) Great-Britain Parliaments. He was also a High Sheriff of Suffolk.

Calthorpe was buried in Elvetham with a memorial (with bust) by James Hardy.

== Family ==
Calthorpe's first wife was his cousin Priscilla Reynolds (died 19 August 1709), daughter of Sir Robert Reynolds (and widow of Sir Richard Knight of Chawton) whom he married at Westminster Abbey, 11 April 1681; and with whom he had an only son Reynolds (6 November 1689 – 1714), and who was Member for the Borough of Hindon in the 4th British Parliament. Reynolds the Younger died unmarried, 10 April 1714.

Calthorpe's second wife, whom he married in 1715, was The Hon. Barbara Yelverton (c. 1692 – 1724), eldest daughter of Henry Yelverton, 1st Viscount Longueville and 15th Baron Grey of Ruthyn, and wife, whom he married in 1689, Barbara Talbot (c. 1665 – 1763), who lived to the old age of 98 and with whom he had seven children, second daughter and one of the coheirs of Sir John Talbot of Lacock Abbey, Wiltshire, Long Acre, Westminster, and Salwarpe, Gloucestershire. They had a son, Sir Henry Calthorpe, and one daughter, Barbara Calthorpe. Henry (c. 1717 – 1788), was a Member of Parliament for Hindon and a Knight of the Bath. He died unmarried and by his death the male line of this family became extinct. His estates devolved to the issue of Barbara Calthorpe (c. 1716 – 1782), his only sister, who was married in 1741 as his second wife to Sir Henry Gough of Edgbaston, in Warwickshire, MP for Totnes and afterwards for Bramber, with whom she had six children. Henry, their eldest son, on the death of Sir Henry Calthorpe his uncle, assumed the name and arms of Calthorpe, and was created Baron Calthorpe, of Cockthorpe in Norfolk, 15 June 1796.
