= Henry Lee Warner (politician) =

English landowner and Tory politician

Henry Lee Warner (23 July 1688 – 13 December 1760) was an English landowner and Tory politician who sat in the House of Commons from 1711 to 1713.

Warner was the son of Henry Lee and his wife Dorothy Howe, daughter of Sir George Howe, 1st Baronet, and his wife Elizabeth Grimston. He was educated at Christ Church, Oxford, and entered Inner Temple in on 26 March 1706.

Supported by his uncle, Sir James Howe, 2nd Baronet, Warner was elected Member of Parliament for Hindon on 15 May 1711 and held the seat until 1713. He made little impact in parliament although he saw through an Act of Parliament concerning his inheritance of family estates that were left to his deceased brother. He decided not to stand in 1713 and instead he undertook a Grand Tour of Europe, visiting France, Switzerland, Italy, Germany and the Netherlands until 1716. On his return he settled at Walsingham Abbey in Norfolk together with his father. In 1736 he inherited the manor of Berwick St Leonard, Wiltshire, from his uncle Sir James.

Warner died at the age of 72 leaving his son lands in six counties.

Warner married Mary Milles, daughter of Samuel Milles of Herne and Nackington who was MP for Canterbury. They had four sons and a daughter.
